= Supermodel =

Highly paid fashion model

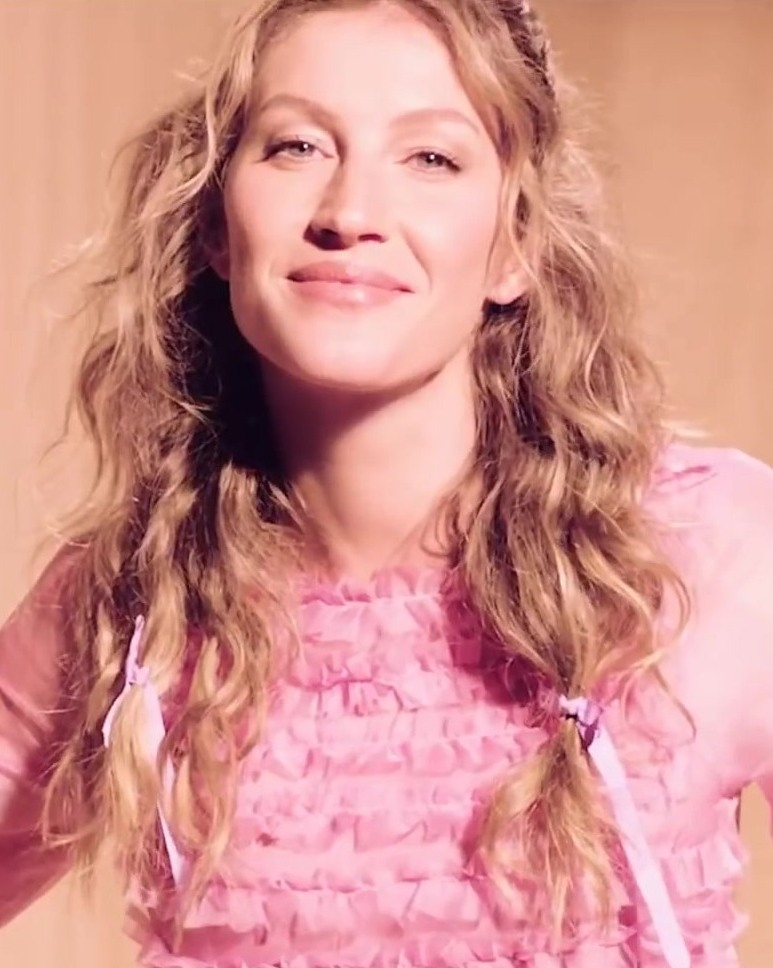
Gisele Bündchen was the world's highest-paid supermodel between 2002 and 2016.

A supermodel is a highly paid fashion model who has a worldwide reputation and background in haute couture and commercial modeling. The term became popular in the 1990s. Supermodels usually work for prominent fashion designers and clothing brands. They may have multimillion-dollar contracts, endorsements, and campaigns. Supermodels have branded themselves as household names and worldwide recognition is associated with their modeling careers. They have been on the covers of leading fashion magazines. Claudia Schiffer stated in 2007 that, "In order to become a supermodel one must be on all the covers all over the world at the same time so that people can recognise the girls."

== History ==
=== Origins ===
An early use of the term supermodel appeared in 1891, in an interview with artist Henry Stacy Marks for The Strand Magazine, in which Marks told journalist Harry How, "A good many models are addicted to drink, and, after sitting a while, will suddenly go to sleep. Then I have had what I call the 'super' model. You know the sort of man; he goes in for theatrical effect ..." On 6 October 1942, a writer named Judith Cass had used the term super model for her article in the Chicago Tribune, which headlined "Super Models Are Signed for Fashion Show". Later in 1943, an agent named Clyde Matthew Dessner used the term in a "how-to" book about modeling, entitled So You Want to Be a Model!, in which Dessner wrote, "She will be a super-model, but the girl in her will be like the girl in you—quite ordinary, but ambitious and eager for personal development." According to Model: The Ugly Business of Beautiful Women by Michael Gross, the term supermodel was first used by Dessner in the 1940s. In 1949, Cosmopolitan magazine referred to Anita Colby, the highest-paid model at the time, as a "super model": "She's been super model, super movie saleswoman, and top brass at Selznick and Paramount." On 18 October 1959, Vancouver's Chinatown News described Susan Chew as a "super model".

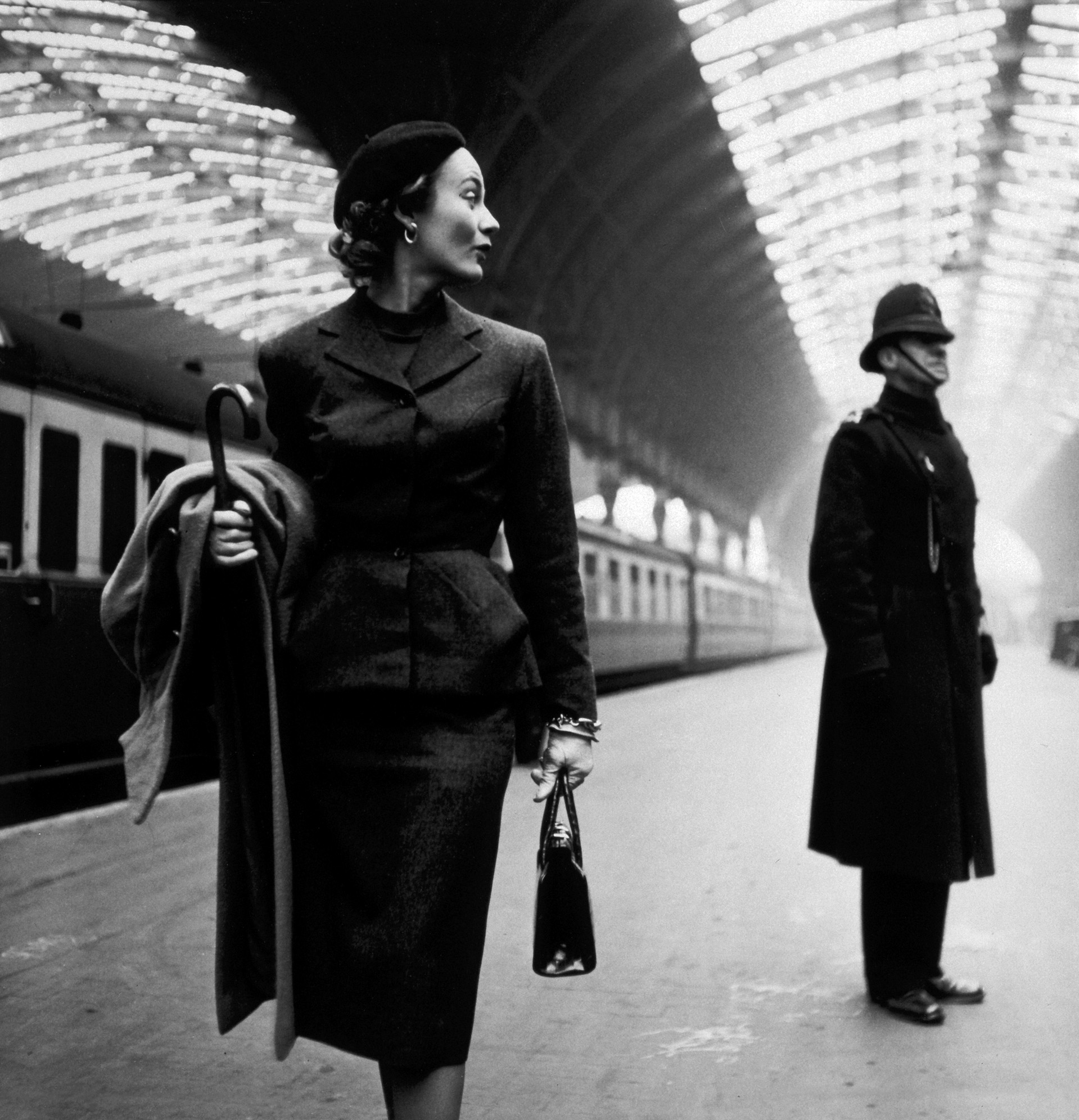
Lisa Fonssagrives at London Paddington station, 1951

The term supermodel had also been used several times in the media in the 1960s and 1970s. In 1965, the encyclopedic guide American Jurisprudence Trials used the term "super model" ("...at issue was patient's belief that her husband was having an affair with a super model"). On 21 March 1967, The New York Times referred to Twiggy as a supermodel; the February 1968 article of Glamour listed all 19 "supermodels"; The Chicago Daily Defender wrote "New York Designer Turns Super Model" in January 1970; The Washington Post and the Mansfield News Journal used the term in 1971; and in 1974, both the Chicago Tribune and The Advocate used the term "supermodel" in their articles. American Vogue used the term "super-model" to describe Jean Shrimpton in the 15 October 1965 edition, and "supermodel" on the cover page to describe Margaux Hemingway in the 1 September 1975 edition. Hemingway was again described as a "supermodel" in the 25 July 1977 edition of Time. Jet also described Beverly Johnson as a "supermodel" in the 22 December 1977 edition.

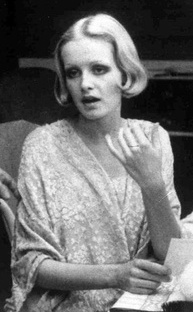
Twiggy, on set for The Boy Friend (1971)

Model Janice Dickinson has incorrectly stated that she coined the term supermodel in 1979, as a compound of Superman and model. During an interview with Entertainment Tonight, Dickinson stated that her agent, Monique Pilar of Elite Model Management, asked her, "Janice, who do you think you are, Superman?" She replied, "No... I'm a supermodel, honey, and you will refer to me as a supermodel and you will start a supermodel division." Dickinson also claims to have been the first supermodel.

Lisa Fonssagrives is widely considered to have been the world's first supermodel, with a career that began in the 1930s. She was in most of the major fashion magazines and general interest magazines from the 1930s to the 1950s, including Town & Country, Life, Vogue, the original Vanity Fair, Harper's Bazaar, and Time. Evelyn Nesbit (with a career launched around 1900) and Dorian Leigh (her career launched in 1944) have also been called the world's first supermodel, as well as Jean Shrimpton (early 1960s), and Gia Carangi (late 1970s).

Dutch-born model Wilhelmina Cooper holds the record for most covers on American Vogue, appearing 27 or 28 times throughout the 1950s and 1960s. Cooper would go on to found Wilhelmina Models modeling and talent agency in 1967.

=== 1960s–1970s ===
In February 1968, an article in Glamour described 19 models as "supermodels": Cheryl Tiegs, Veruschka, Lisa Palmer, Peggy Moffitt, Sue Murray, Twiggy, Sunny Harnett, Marisa Berenson, Gretchen Harris, Heide Wiedeck, Iris Bianchi, Hiroko Matsumoto, Anne de Zogheb, Kathy Carpenter, Jean Shrimpton, Jean Patchett, Benedetta Barzini, Claudia Duxbury, and Agneta Frieberg.

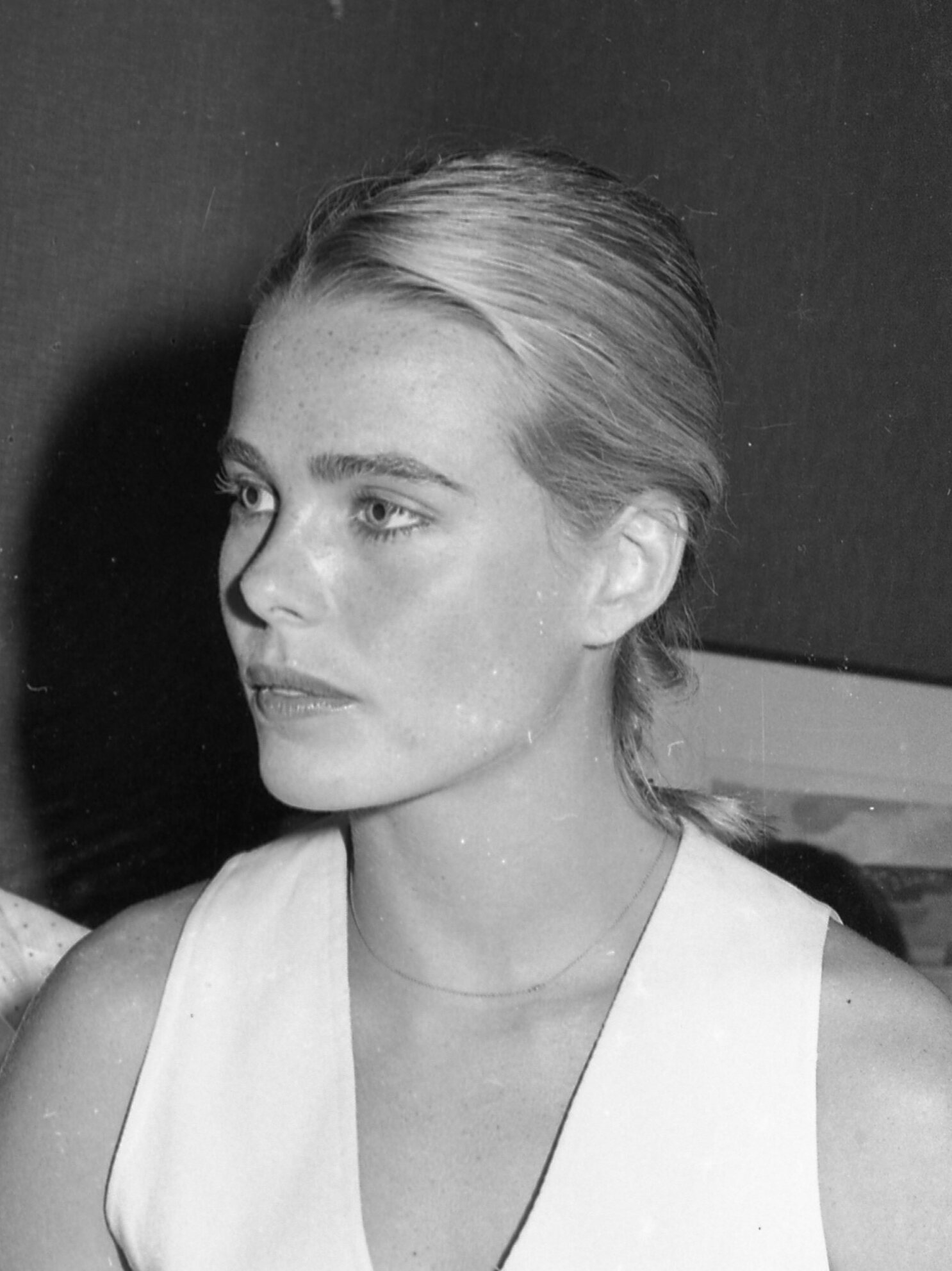
Margaux Hemingway in 1976. In 1975, Hemingway landed a then-unprecedented million-dollar contract as the face of Fabergé's Babe perfume.

Donyale Luna is widely regarded as the first black supermodel. She was the first black model to appear on the cover of Harper's Bazaar in 1965, where she was depicted in an illustration, and the first to appear on the cover of British Vogue in 1966. Naomi Sims has been referred to as the first black supermodel. She was the first black model to be featured on the cover of Ladies' Home Journal in 1968 and Life in 1969. In 1971, Carol LaBrie became the first black model to grace the cover of Vogue Italia. Beverly Johnson was the first black model to appear on the cover of American Vogue in 1974 and French Elle in 1975. Pat Cleveland is another pioneering black model whom fashion editor André Leon Talley described as "the all-time superstar model."

Anna Bayle, a Filipino-born model who rose to fame in the 1970s, has been cited as one of the first Southeast Asian supermodels.

In the 1970s is when many consider the origin of the supermodel, some models becoming more prominent as their names became more recognizable to the general public by commercial endorsements, magazine covers, posters, securing large sums of money for cosmetic contracts, TV appearances and movie roles. Sports Illustrated editor Jule Campbell abandoned then-current modeling trends for its fledgling Sports Illustrated Swimsuit Issue by photographing "bigger and healthier" California models, and captioning the photographs with their names, turning many of them into household names and establishing the swimsuit issue as a cornerstone of supermodel status.

In 1973, Lauren Hutton became the first model to receive a contract from a cosmetics company when Revlon hired her to sell their Ultima line. She has also appeared on the cover of Vogue 26 times.

In 1975, Margaux Hemingway landed a then-unprecedented million-dollar contract as the face of Fabergé's Babe perfume and the same year, appeared on the cover of Time magazine, labelled as one of the "New Beauties", giving further name recognition to fashion models.

Christie Brinkley has the distinction of having the longest-running cosmetics contract of any model in history when she represented CoverGirl for twenty five years.

=== 1980s ===
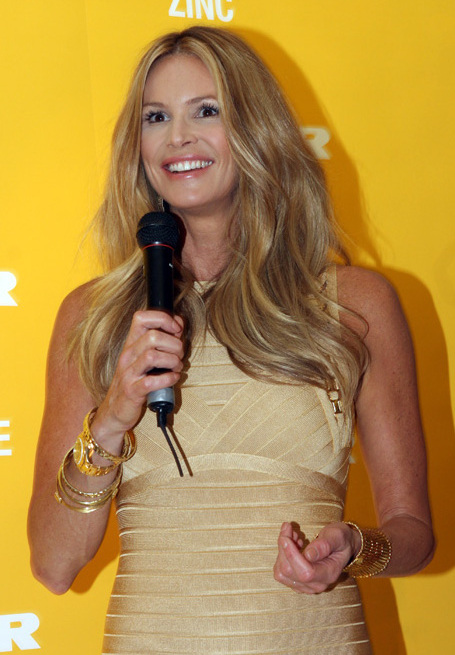
Elle Macpherson, nicknamed "The Body" by Time magazine

In October 1981, Life cited Shelley Hack, Lauren Hutton, and Iman for Revlon, Margaux Hemingway for Fabergé, Karen Graham for Estée Lauder, Cristina Ferrare for Max Factor, and Cheryl Tiegs for CoverGirl by proclaiming them the "million dollar faces" of the beauty industry. These supermodels negotiated previously unheard of lucrative and exclusive deals with the giant cosmetics companies, were instantly recognizable, and their names became well known to the general public.

In the early 1980s, Inès de La Fressange was the first model to sign an exclusive modeling contract with an haute couture fashion house, Chanel. During the early 1980s, fashion designers began advertising on television and billboards. Catwalk regulars like Gia Carangi, Tiegs, Christie Brinkley, Kim Alexis, Paulina Porizkova, Yasmin Le Bon, Kathy Ireland, Brooke Shields, and Elle Macpherson began to endorse products with their names, as well as their faces, through the marketing of brands, such as Diet Pepsi and Ford trucks. In 1980, 14-year-old Shields was the youngest fashion model ever to appear on the cover of Vogue. Later that same year, Shields appeared in controversial print and TV ads for Calvin Klein jeans. The TV ad included her saying the famous tagline, "You want to know what comes between me and my Calvins? Nothing." Brooke Shields' ads would help catapult Klein's career to super-designer status.

As the models began to embrace old-style glamour, they were starting to replace film stars as symbols of luxury and wealth. In this regard, supermodels were viewed not so much as individuals but as images.

=== 1990s ===
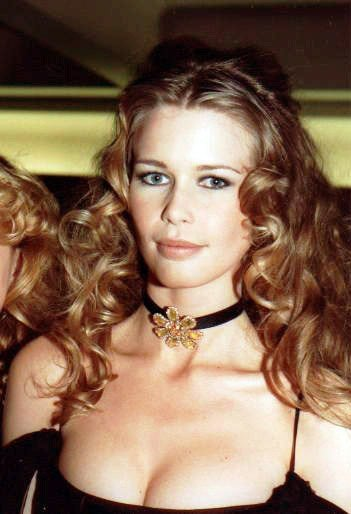
Claudia Schiffer rose to prominence in the 1990s as a face of Chanel.

By the 1990s, the supermodel became increasingly prominent in the media. The title became tantamount to superstar, to signify a supermodel's fame having risen simply from "personality". Supermodels did talk shows, were cited in gossip columns, partied at the trendiest nightspots, landed movie roles, inspired franchises, dated or married film stars, and earned themselves millions. Fame empowered them to take charge of their careers, to market themselves, and to command higher fees.

The new era began in 1990, with the era-defining British Vogue cover of Cindy Crawford, Christy Turlington, Linda Evangelista, Naomi Campbell, and Tatjana Patitz, photographed by Peter Lindbergh, which created such an impression on the fashion world that they came to embody the term "supermodel". Each model had gradually attained fame since the mid-1980s and was now among the industry's top stars. Selected by Lindbergh for the January cover of Vogue, the cover inspired singer George Michael to cast the same five models in the music video for his song, "Freedom! '90", directed by David Fincher. The other photograph that captured this new generation of fashion models is the black and white nude of Crawford, Patitz, Campbell and Stephanie Seymour taken by Herb Ritts that originally ran in the May 1989 issue of Rolling Stone, until a variation of this image which included Turlington was released in the 1990s, only after a contract exclusively binding her to Calvin Klein expired—thereby publicly revealing the now iconic image "Stephanie, Cindy, Christy, Tatjana, Naomi, Hollywood 1989." Lindbergh's and Ritts' group images helped each model attain worldwide fame by sharing covers of all the international editions of Vogue, walking the catwalks for the world's top designers, and becoming known by their first names alone.

Today, Campbell, Crawford, Evangelista, Patitz and Turlington are regarded as the "Original Supermodels", but the term has been used to describe the pioneering supermodels before them that paved the way and started the path to prominence, both publicly and professionally, such as Lauren Hutton, Beverly Johnson, Cheryl Tiegs, Christie Brinkley, Pat Cleveland and others. Also in the 1990s, Connie Fleming became known as one of the first transgender supermodels. She frequently appeared in shows by Thierry Mugler and appeared in the George Michael music video "Too Funky".

In 1991, Turlington signed a contract with Maybelline that paid her $800,000 for twelve days' work each year. Four years later, Claudia Schiffer reportedly earned $12 million for her various modeling assignments. Authorities, ranging from Karl Lagerfeld to Time, had declared the supermodels more glamorous than movie stars.

Campbell, Evangelista and Turlington became known as The Trinity, a term first used by photographer Steven Meisel and noted by journalist Michael Gross. Evangelista was known as the "Chameleon", for her ability to transform her look and reinvent herself. Turlington was known as the "insurance model", saying "clients know that if they hire me, nothing will go wrong". Campbell was the first black model to appear on the front covers of Time, French Vogue, British Vogue, and the September issue of American Vogue, traditionally the biggest and most important issue of the year.

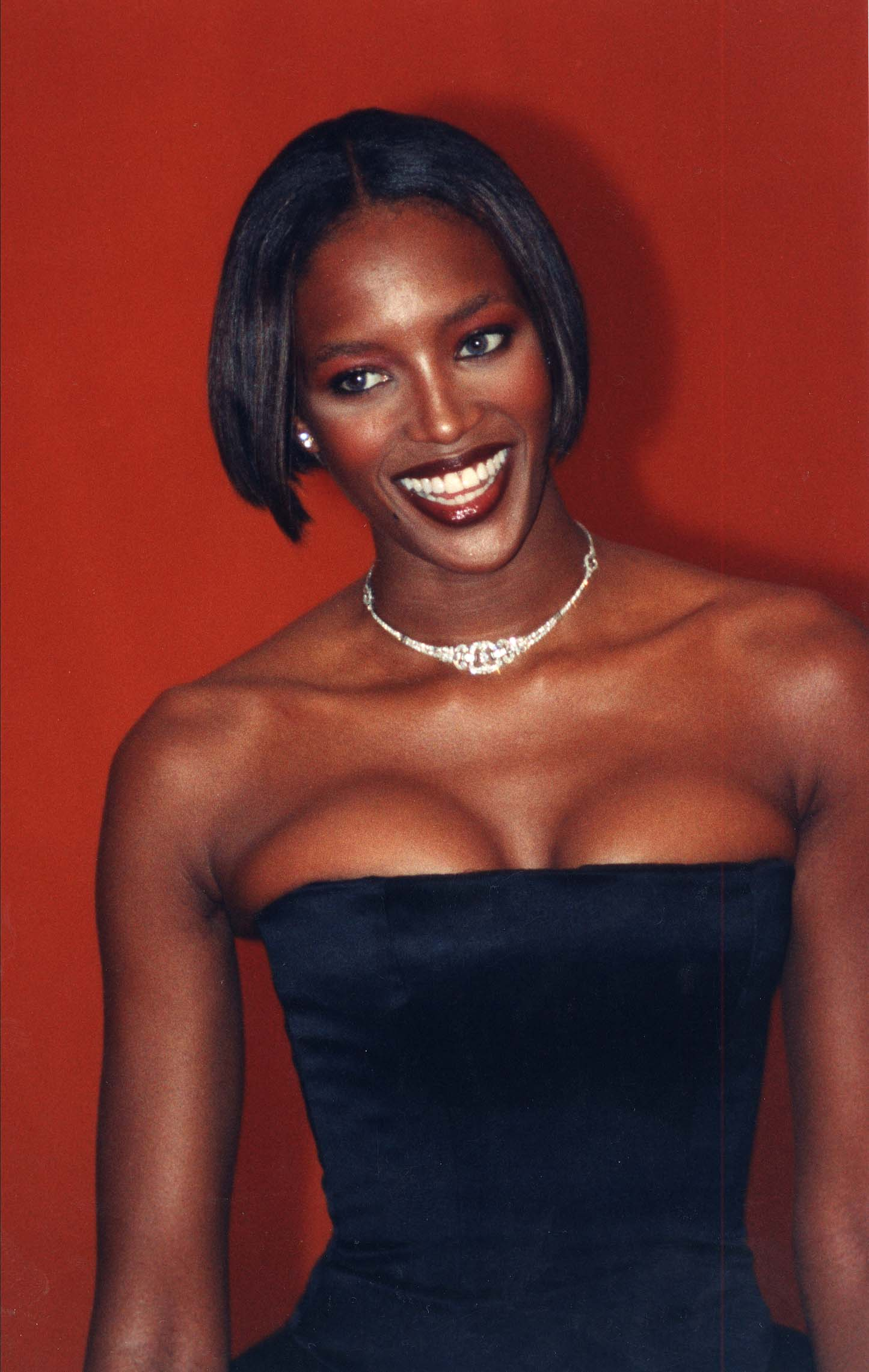
Naomi Campbell, one of "The Big Five" models in the 1990s

Campbell, Crawford, Evangelista, Turlington and Patitz were the original group to be regarded as "The Big Five" supermodels of the 1990s. The term "The Big Five" was later used to describe Campbell, Crawford, Evangelista, Turlington and Claudia Schiffer, and with the addition of Kate Moss, they became known as "the Big Six". It was Linda Evangelista, Tatjana Patitz, Naomi Campbell, Christy Turlington, and Kate Moss who appeared together in the highest budgeted advertising campaign of all time, starring the original supermodels (US$4.5 million in 1992, adjusted for inflation in 2021, US$8.5 million)) and resulted in a now iconic television commercial for the Vauxhall Corsa automobile.

In the 2006 book In Vogue: The Illustrated History of the World's Most Famous Fashion Magazine (Rizzoli), the editors cite the "original supermodels" and Schiffer when quoting Vogue Magazine Editor-In-Chief, Anna Wintour, who said, "Those girls were so fabulous for fashion and totally reflected that time ... [They] were like movie stars." The editors name famous models from previous decades, but explain that, "None of them attained the fame and worldwide renown bestowed on Linda Evangelista, Christy Turlington, Cindy Crawford, Naomi Campbell, Tatjana Patitz, Stephanie Seymour, Claudia Schiffer, Yasmeen Ghauri, and Karen Mulder, in the late 1980s and early 1990s. These models burst out beyond the pages of the magazines. Many became the faces of cosmetics brands and perfumes, had their own television programs and physical-fitness videos, and their own lines of lingerie ... Their lives, activities, influences, and images were the subjects of all types of sociological and historical analysis." Tyra Banks had begun her career as a model, booking a record-breaking 25 shows in 1991, during her breakout year. She achieved Supermodel status, and rivaled Naomi Campbell as the top Black model in the world.

In the mid-1990s, the initial era of the supermodel ended and a new era for the supermodel began driven by heroin chic. By the late 1990s, actresses, pop singers, and other entertainment celebrities began gradually replacing models on fashion magazine covers and ad campaigns. The pendulum of limelight left many models in anonymity. A popular "conspiracy theory" explaining the supermodel's disappearance is that designers and fashion editors grew weary of the "I won't get out of bed for less than $10,000 a day" attitude and made sure no small group of models would ever again have the power of the Big Six.

Charles Gandee, associate editor at Vogue, has said that high prices and poor attitudes contributed less to the decline of the supermodel. As clothes became less flashy, designers turned to models who were less glamorous, so they would not overpower the clothing. Whereas many supermodels of the previous era were American-born, their accents making for an easier transition to stardom, the majority of models began coming from non-English speaking countries and cultures, making the crossover to mainstream spokesperson and cover star difficult. However, the term continued to be applied to notable models such as Kristen McMenamy, Stella Tennant, Laetitia Casta, Eva Herzigová, Carla Bruni, Tatiana Sorokko, Yasmin Le Bon, Amber Valletta, Shalom Harlow, Nadja Auermann, Helena Christensen, Patricia Velásquez, Adriana Karembeu, Valeria Mazza and later, Milla Jovovich.

=== 2000s and present day ===
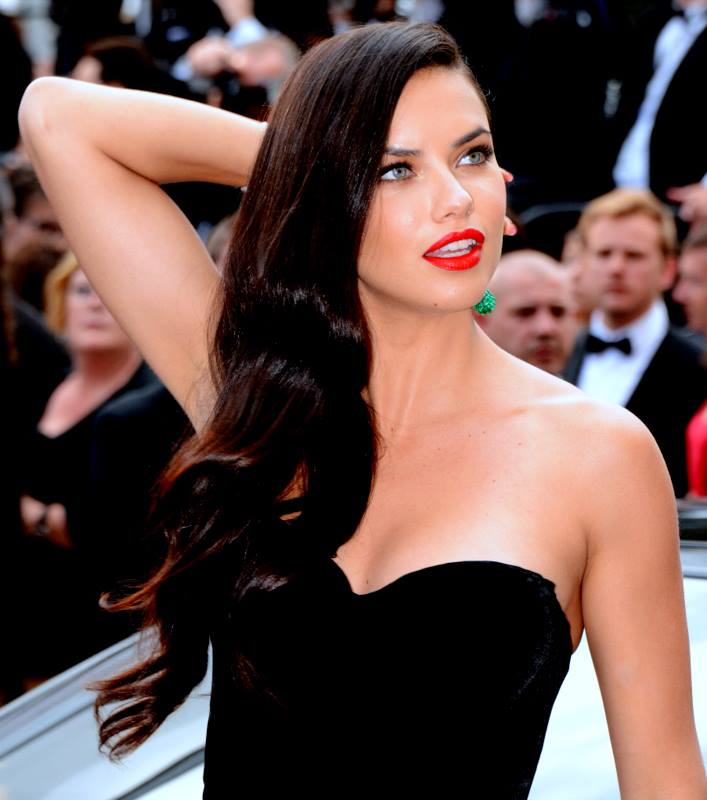
Adriana Lima, one of the "New Supers" and the longest-running Victoria's Secret Angel

Emerging in the late 1990s, Gisele Bündchen became the first in a wave of Brazilian models to gain popularity in the industry and with the public. With numerous covers of Vogue under her belt, including an issue that dubbed her the "Return of the Sexy Model", Bündchen was credited with ending the "heroin chic" era of models. Following in her footsteps by signing contracts with Victoria's Secret, fellow Brazilians Adriana Lima and Alessandra Ambrosio rose to prominence; however, they were unable to cross over into the world of TV, movies and talk shows as easily as their predecessors, due to their foreign accents. Not to mention other big stars of 2000s era such as Carmen Kass, Karolína Kurková, Isabeli Fontana, Natalia Vodianova and Natasha Poly, which also dominated the runways and ad campaigns along with Bündchen et al.

Several seasons later, they were followed by Eastern Europeans, barely into their teens, pale, and "bordering on anorexic. They were too young to become movie stars or date celebrities; too skeletal to bag Victoria's Secret contracts; and a lack of English didn't bode well for a broad media career". The opportunities for superstardom were waning in the modeling world, and models like Heidi Klum and Tyra Banks took to television with reality shows like Project Runway and Germany's Next Topmodel, and America's Next Top Model, respectively, to not only remain relevant but establish themselves as media moguls.

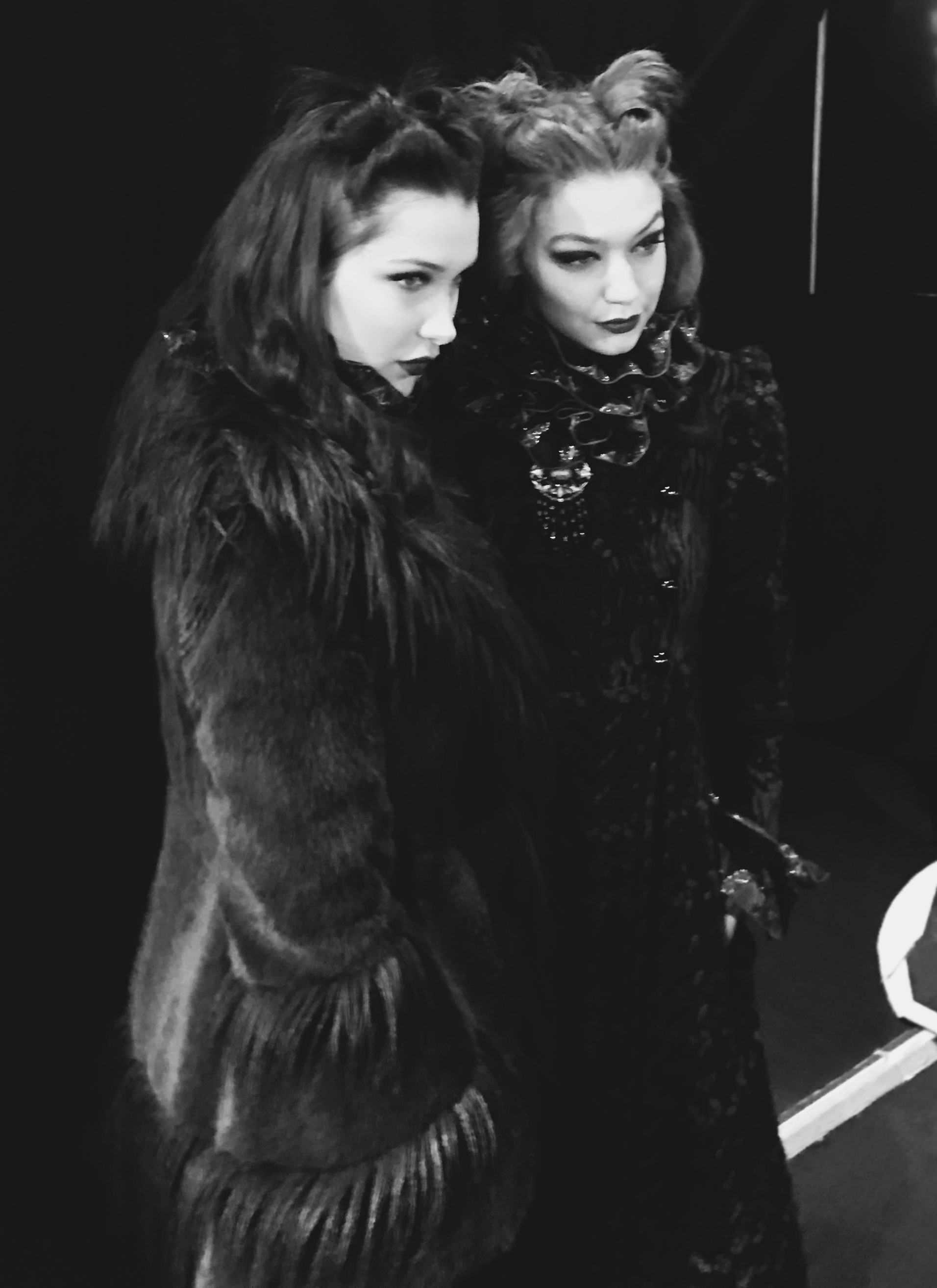
Bella Hadid (left) and Gigi Hadid (right), two of the highest-paid models of 2021

Contrary to the fashion industry's celebrity trend of the previous decade, lingerie retailer Victoria's Secret continues to groom and launch young talents into supermodel status, awarding their high-profile "Angels" multi-year, multimillion-dollar contracts.

American Vogue dubbed ten models (Doutzen Kroes, Agyness Deyn, Hilary Rhoda, Raquel Zimmermann, Coco Rocha, Lily Donaldson, Chanel Iman, Sasha Pivovarova, Caroline Trentini and Jessica Stam) as the new crop of supermodels in their May 2007 cover story, while the likes of Christie Brinkley, Christy Turlington, and Linda Evangelista returned to reclaim prominent contracts from celebrities and younger models.

The rise of social media and so-called "nepotism babies" has seen a shift in the world of modelling from the late 2010s onwards. This means that many of today's 'supermodels' arguably took a rise to fame and were given the opportunities as they have due to their rich and famous families. Examples of these models are Kendall Jenner, Cara Delevingne, Bella Hadid, Gigi Hadid and Kaia Gerber. Despite the controversy surrounding these models and arguments that they only got their fame due to their families, they have proven to be some of the most successful models of today. In 2021, Kendall Jenner was named as the highest-paid supermodel, earning $40 million. The Hadid sisters weren't far behind, with Bella and Gigi earning $19 million and $20 million respectively.

== Male supermodels ==
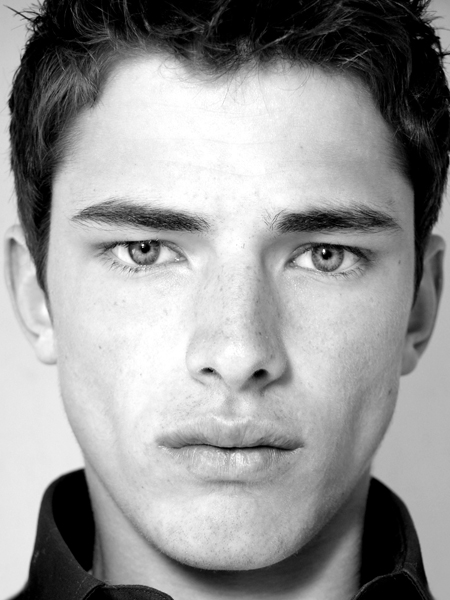
Sean O'Pry became the most "successful" male model on Forbes earning lists.

In addition to the models stated previously, a top-grossing part of the industry that tends to be overlooked is the male side of modeling. Even though women are predominantly known in the modeling industry, men also appear in advertisements for clothing, cologne, sportswear and other such accessories. Established fashion brands, play prominent roles in promoting the careers of most male super models.

Modeling is one of the only industries that sees a gender gap leaning towards women. Women earn up to 75% more than men in the modeling industry. The highest-paid models in the world in 2022, the American female model Kendall Jenner earned $40 million while the American male model Sean O'Pry earned $1.5 million, less than 4% of what Jenner is making. Historically, the menswear sector has gotten less financial support than the womenswear industry. In addition to that, there is only 1 male designer for every 20 female designers. Overall, the demand for female models is much greater than that for male models. Some also attribute the pay difference to the lengthier career of male models compared to female models due to the fashion industry's dismissive attitude towards older women.

Study has shown that there has been an annual 17.4% increase in men's clothing online from 2010 to 2015. The men's apparel segment amounts to US$568.9 billion in 2023 and the market is expected to grow annually by 2.9%. Compared to 2014, the men's apparel market in 2023 has grown by 28%. According to Euromonitor, demand for men's clothing has even been growing 0.2% faster than that of women's. In recent years, there have also been separate men's fashion weeks in Paris, Milan, New York, and London. Studies have shown that this can be attributed to more men being found to begin to care more about fashion and beauty and the social media savvy male models / celebrities, like Lucky Blue Smith, Jason Morgan, and David Gandy.

In 1978, photographer Bruce Weber photographed Jeff Aquilon, a water polo player at Pepperdine University, for the Soho Weekly News, a moment later described by V Magazine as a significant shift in male representation in fashion photography. L'Uomo Vogue published a list of the Top 25 Male Models of all time, which included Mark Vanderloo, Michael Flinn, Marcus Schenkenberg, Bruce Hulse, Jeff Aquilon, Jason Lewis, Cameron Alborzian, Robert Konjic, Rick Dietz, Michael Bergin, Alex Lundqvist, Miles O'Keeffe, Tyson Beckford, Sean O'Pry, Brett Salisbury, Lars Burmeister, Ted McGinley, Vincent Gallo, Antonio Sabato Jr., Hoyt Richards, Karl Lindman, Kerry Degman, John Pearson, Tyson Ballou, and Tony Ward.

=== 1990s ===
In 1993, Italian model Fabio Lanzoni was the highest-paid male model worldwide, receiving several million dollars a year doing advertisements for high-end brands like Versace.

In 1994, Polo's sports ad shot by Bruce Weber featured Tyson Beckford, a black masculine male model. Beckford later admitted during an interview in 2014 that, "There's a huge lack of strong African American images in fashion." Beckford also noted that, "I am happy that Ralph Lauren have used guys who look similar like me after."

Milind Soman quickly became a supermodel in India and was one of the most popular supermodels of the world in the 1990s, successfully transitioning to films and television later in life.

Tyson Beckford is known for posing in a number of ads for Ralph Lauren's Polo sport cologne line. Since 1990, he has been the face of Gucci and Tommy Hilfiger, won Model of the year on VH1 Fashion award, and he has also appeared in Calvin Klein's campaign. Another Calvin Klein model is Mark Wahlberg. Many new underwear models 30 years later still look to his campaign poses today.

Tim Boyce was the first openly gay high fashion male supermodel of the 1990s and is credited for increasing the profile of gay celebrities, appearing on the cover of Out magazine as well as campaigns for Giorgio Armani and Gianfranco Ferre.

=== 2000s ===
In 2000s, Bruno Santos, a Brazilian model, became notorious for being the only male model selected to carry out two campaigns simultaneously for two competing fashion houses: Versace and Giorgio Armani. This earned him the nickname "Gisele Bündchen in pants".

Former professional soccer player David Beckham is noted as the Underwear Model of the Century. He has modeled for worldwide ads for H&M, Adidas, Calvin Klein, Burger King, Sainsbury's, and Breitling. British model David Gandy was described as achieving "icon status" by ABC News when they featured him on Nightline, stating, "As the face of Dolce & Gabbana and Lucky Jeans, Gandy is arguably one of the most successful male models ever, but he's a bit modest about that "supermodel" title."

=== 2010s ===
Vogue.com ranked the "Top 10 Male Models of All Time" in September 2014; the list included Tyson Beckford, David Gandy, Brad Kroenig, Sean O'Pry, Jon Kortajarena, Marcus Schenkenberg, Mathias Lauridsen, Mark Vanderloo, Noah Mills, and Evandro Soldati. In 2013, Forbes named O'Pry the highest-paid male model.

== Supermodels today ==
Various magazines and websites, including various international versions of: Elle, Harper's Bazaar, and Vogue, have attributed the 'supermodel' title to a selection of models.

The male models include: David Gandy, Jon Kortajarena, Mathias Lauridsen, Alton Mason, Elton Ilirjani and Simon Nessman.

The female models include: Vittoria Ceretti, Imaan Hammam, Cong He, Felice Noordhoff, Blanca Padilla, Anja Rubik, Mika Schneider, Luz Pavon, Fei Fei Sun, Mona Tougaard, and Rianne Van Rompaey.

=== Plus-size ===
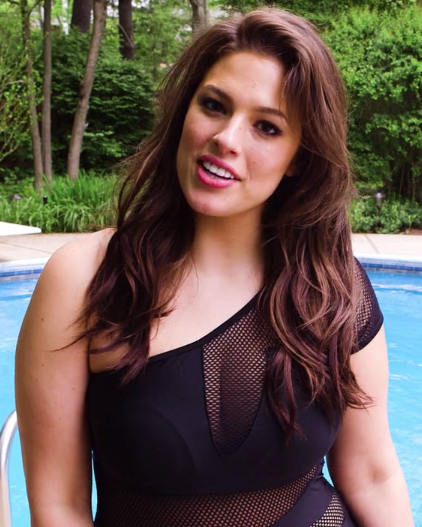
Ashley Graham, a plus-size model

Since 2000, there has been an emergence of models known as female "plus-size" top models, including Robyn Lawley, Crystal Renn, Precious Lee, Ashley Graham, Candice Huffine, Tara Lynn, Whitney Thompson, Katya Zharkova, Denise Bidot, Sophie Dahl, Jennie Runk and Natalie Laughlin. These models have been in catwalks, magazines, and billboards for brands like Vogue, Glamour, Levi's, Forever 21, Cover Girl, Saks Fifth Avenue, GQ Magazine, and Chanel. Graham had widespread amount of news coverage worldwide after Sports Illustrated Swimsuit Issue had her as one of the three covers of the 2016 edition.

=== In-between size ===
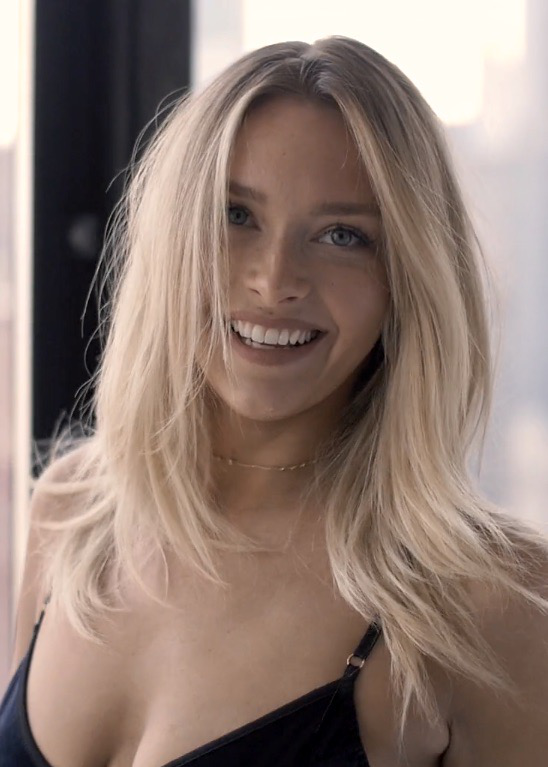
Camille Kostek, an "in-between size" or "middle model"

Camille Kostek, an "in-between size" or "middle model", landed a solo cover of the Sports Illustrated Swimsuit Issue in 2019 despite not being on the extreme end of the spectrum as runway size (0–2) or plus-size (10 up). Recalling her difficulty breaking out she has stated, "I was told that it was too bad that I wasn't a size 10. That plus-size is a big market right now and it's too bad I wasn't measuring bigger. My size (4/6) is considered an "in-between size," meaning I'm not a straight model nor plus model, I'm right in the middle." Regardless, she has walked the runways of New York Fashion Week and Miami Beach Swim Week.

== Perception ==
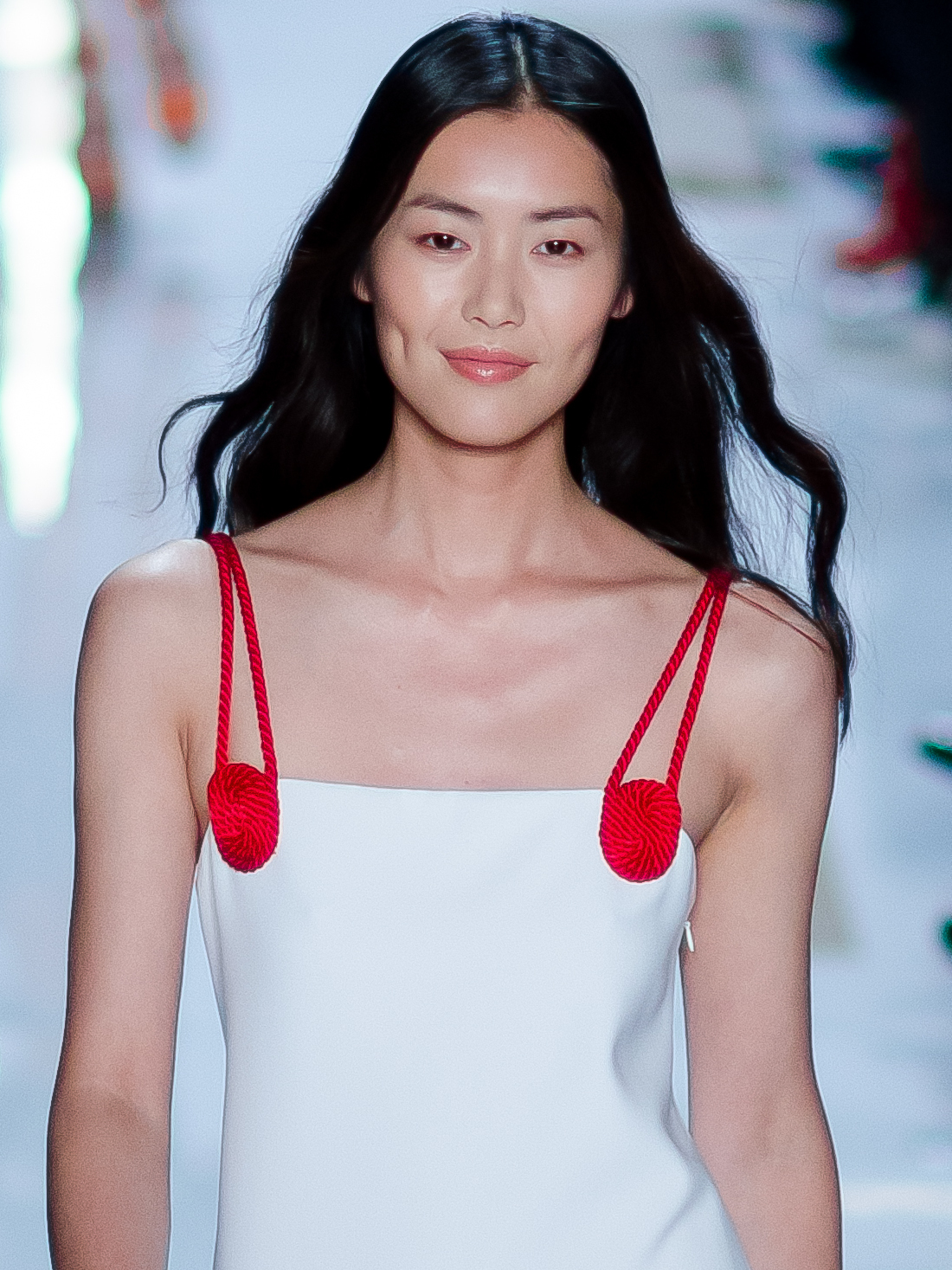
Liu Wen, supermodel of East Asian descent walking for Diane von Fürstenberg Spring/Summer 2014

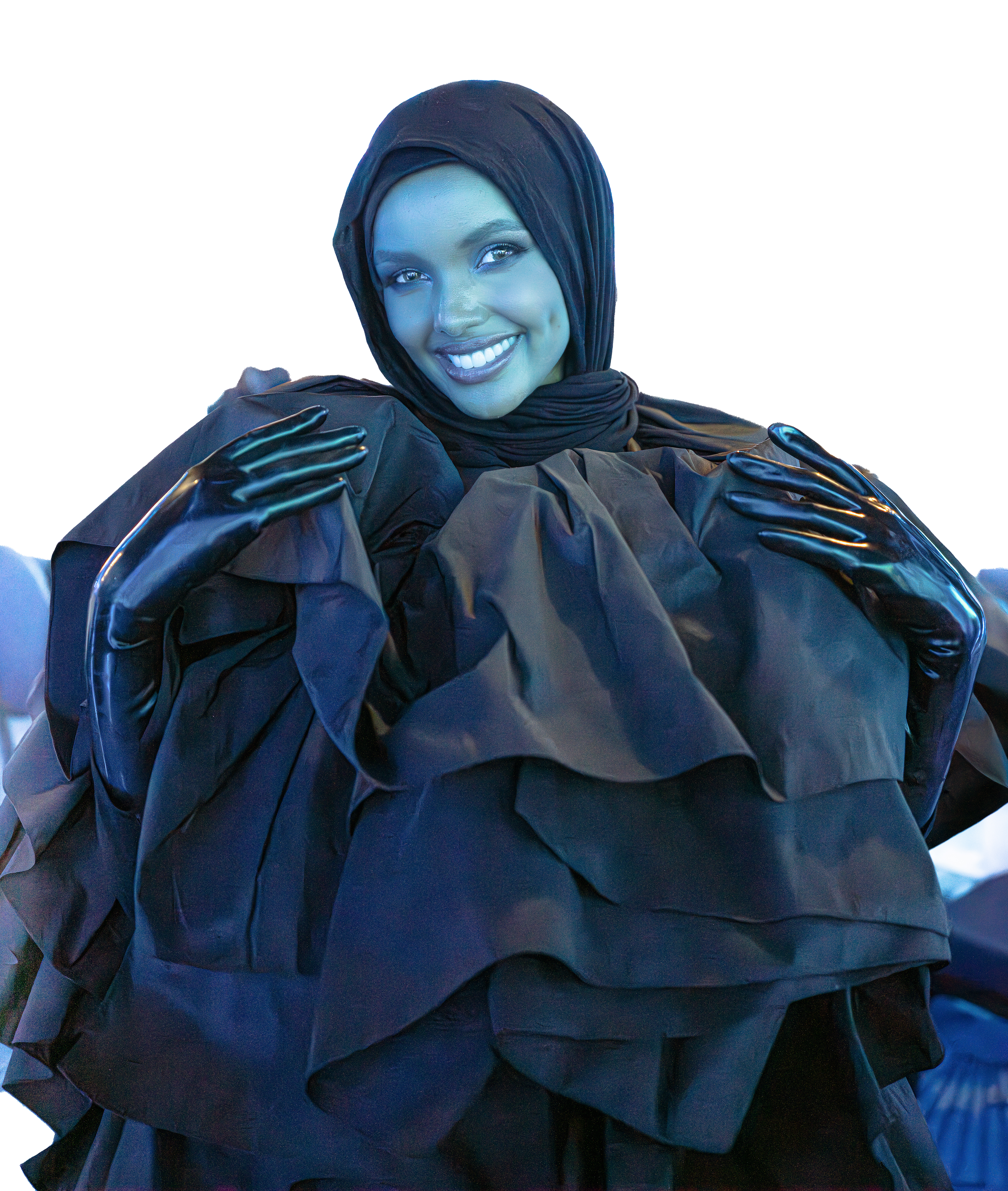
Halima Aden has walked runways and posed for photoshoots wearing a hijab.

Perception of the supermodel as an industry has been frequent inside and outside the fashion press, from complaints that women desiring this status become unhealthily thin to charges of racism of dominant racial groups of the home countries in the first decade of the twenty-first century, where the "supermodel" generally has to conform to the native majority's standard of beauty, for example Northern European standards in United States or Indian standards in India.

According to fashion writer Guy Trebay of The New York Times, in 2007, the "android" look was popular, a vacant stare and thin body serving, according to some fashion industry conventions, to set off the couture. This had not always been the case. In the 1970s in North America, black, heavier and "ethnic" models dominated the runways but social changes in the 1980s to the early 2000s persuaded the power players in the fashion industry to shun suggestions of "otherness".

However, since the latter part of the first decade of the twenty-first century, an increasing level of racial diversity has been noted among supermodels in the American fashion scene, catering to the growing East Asian markets, including Japanese model Tao Okamoto and Chinese models Fei Fei Sun and Liu Wen. Due to the rising importance of social media and social movements such as third wave body positivity, the range of diversity within the industry expanded to diversity in sizes, genders and social media visibility.

== See also ==
- Evelyn Nesbit, a widely photographed fashion model c. 1900
- Physical attractiveness
- Self-image
- Sex symbol
- Superstar
- Zoolander, 2001 film by Ben Stiller about a supermodel
