= Cathy Olkin =

American planetary scientist

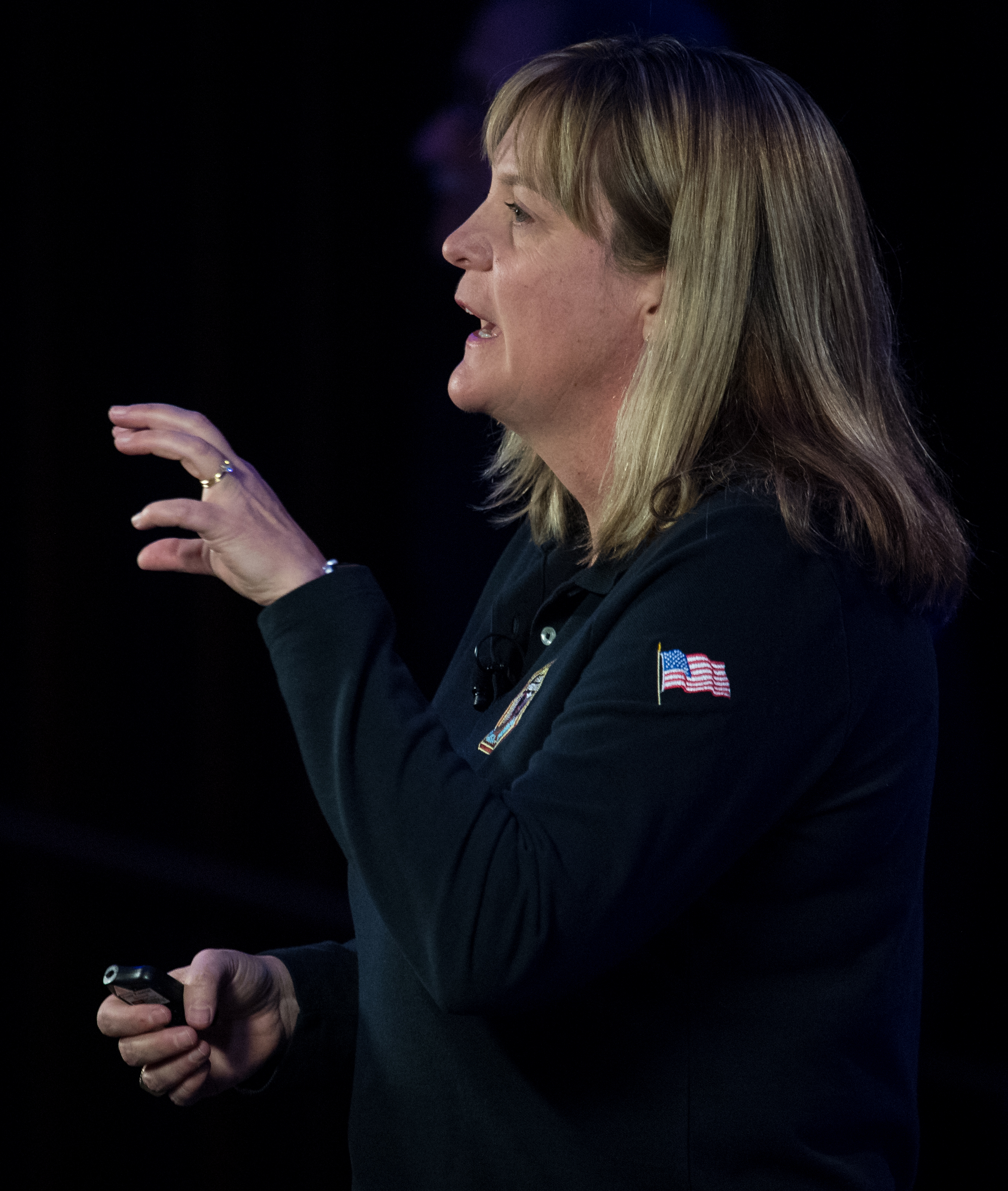
- Education: Massachusetts Institute of Technology
- Scientific career
- Workplaces: Southwest Research Institute
- Doctoral advisor: James L. Elliot
- Website: www.boulder.swri.edu/~colkin/CathyOlkin/About_Me.html

Cathy Olkin is a planetary scientist at the Southwest Research Institute, focusing on the outer Solar System. She is deputy principal investigator for NASA's Lucy mission examining the Trojan asteroids around Jupiter, which launched in 2021 and will fly past its targets between 2025 and 2033.

== Early life and education ==
Olkin was born and raised in Michigan. As a child, Olkin considered a variety of careers in science and academia, including geologist, paleontologist, archaeologist, and doctor.

In college, she was pre-med before switching to engineering, earning a B.S. in Aeronautics and Astronautics from Massachusetts Institute of Technology (MIT) in 1988, then an M.S., also in Aeronautics and Astronautics, from Stanford University in 1989. Olkin then returned to MIT where she earned a Ph.D. in Earth, Atmospheric and Planetary Science in 1996. Her dissertation advisor was James L. Elliot.

== Career ==
Olkin was a deputy project scientist on NASA's New Horizons team responsible for the July 2015 flyby of Pluto and became co-principal investigator for New Horizons' Ralph instrument, a color camera and near-infrared imaging spectrometer.

She is deputy principal investigator for NASA's Lucy mission examining the Trojan asteroids around Jupiter, which launched in 2021 and will fly past its targets between 2025 and 2033.

Olkin's scientific research has earned an h-index of 24. She has published over 400 papers, with more than 2,000 citations.

She is also the author of the title story "All These Wonders" in The Moth radio show's 20th anniversary collection, The Moth Presents: All These Wonders. True Stories About Facing the Unknown; reviewing the collection in The New York Times. Michiko Kakutani described Olkin's contribution as "a thrilling account...of last-minute emergency repairs made to the New Horizons spacecraft as it traveled three billion miles to get a close-up of Pluto."

Olkin also engages in public outreach. In 2015, Olkin shared discoveries from her work with NASA's New Horizons mission at a TEDxDetroit talk.
