= Lauridsen =

Lauridsen is a surname. Notable people with the surname include:

- John Lauridsen (born 1959), Danish football player
- Karina Lauridsen (born 1976), Danish Paralympic swimmer
- Lisbeth Stuer-Lauridsen (born 1968), Danish badminton player
- Mathias Lauridsen (born 1984), Danish model
- Morten Lauridsen (born 1943), American composer
- Thomas Stuer-Lauridsen (born 1971), Danish badminton player
