= Tamara Tunie =

American actress (born 1959)

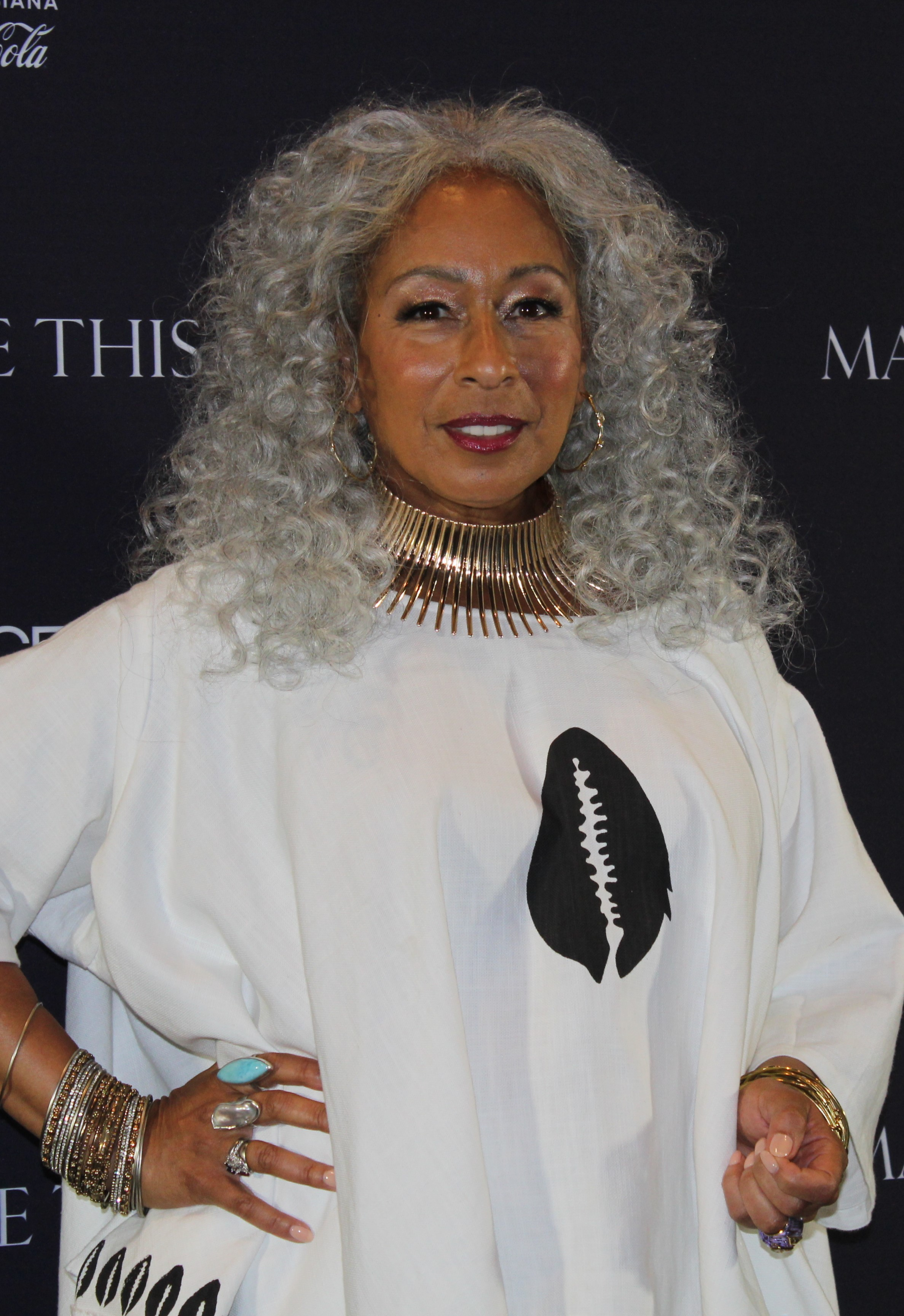
- Tunie in 2025
- Born: March 14, 1959 (age 67); McKeesport, Pennsylvania, U.S.
- Other name: Tamara Tunie Boquett
- Education: Carnegie Mellon University (BFA)
- Occupations: Actress; singer; director; producer
- Years active: 1981–present
- Spouses: Greg Bouquett (m. 1988; div. 1991) Gregory Generet (m. 1995; div. 2018)

Tamara Tunie (born March 14, 1959) is an American film, stage, and television actress, singer, director, and producer. She is best known for her roles as attorney Jessica Griffin on the CBS soap opera As the World Turns (1987–1995, 1999–2007, 2009) and as medical examiner Melinda Warner in the NBC police drama Law & Order: Special Victims Unit (2000–2021). Tunie also appeared in films such as Rising Sun (1993), The Devil's Advocate (1997), The Caveman's Valentine (2001) receiving an Independent Spirit Award nomination for Best Supporting Female, Flight (2012), and Whitney Houston: I Wanna Dance with Somebody (2022). Since February 2025, she has played the role of Anita Dupree on the CBS daytime soap opera Beyond the Gates, for which she received the Daytime Emmy Award for Outstanding Lead Actress in a Drama Series in 2026.

== Early life ==
A native of Homestead, Pennsylvania, she was the fourth of six children raised in the family-run funeral home by parents James W. Tunie and Evelyn Hawkins Tunie. She sang in her church choir, was in the high school band, and took dance lessons in her hometown. She earned a Bachelor of Fine Arts in Musical theater from Carnegie Mellon University in 1981. She was elected to the university's Board of Trustees in 2020.

== Career ==
Tunie made her Broadway debut alongside Lena Horne in Lena Horne: The Lady and Her Music in 1981. From 1987 to 1995, she starred in the CBS daytime soap opera As the World Turns playing attorney Jessica Griffin. She reprised the role from 1999 to 2007, receiving NAACP Image Awards nominations for Outstanding Actress in a Daytime Drama Series in 2003 and 2004. In the 1990s Tunie guest-starred in primetime dramas including Swift Justice, Law & Order, Chicago Hope, New York Undercover and Sex and the City. She also had a recurring role as Lillian Fancy in the ABC police drama NYPD Blue from 1994 to 1997.

Tunie has had supporting roles in a number of movies. She made her film debut in Sweet Lorraine opposite Maureen Stapleton and later appeared in Wall Street (1987). Tunie worked twice with Al Pacino; she portrayed his press secretary in the film City Hall (1996) and the possessed wife of a partner in his law firm in the film The Devil's Advocate (1997). Her other credits include Bloodhounds of Broadway (1989), Rising Sun (1993), Eve's Bayou (1997), The Peacemaker (1997), and Snake Eyes (1998). In 2001, she received a nomination for the Independent Spirit Awards for her role in film The Caveman's Valentine, based on George Dawes Green's eponymous novel, opposite Samuel L. Jackson.

In 2000, Tunie joined the cast of NBC police procedural series Law & Order: Special Victims Unit as medical examiner Melinda Warner. She made her debut as Warner in the second season episode titled "Noncompliance" and continued to make recurring appearances until Season 7, when she became a regular cast member. She also played this role in Law & Order: Trial by Jury in episode "Day" in 2005, and in the Chicago Fire episode "We Called Her Jellybean" in 2015. Tunie was regular on SVU from Season 7 to 12 and later made recurring appearances to Season 17. She later appeared in episodes in 2018 and 2019. In 2024, She reprised her role in season four of Law & Order: Organized Crime, reuniting with Christopher Meloni twelve years later.

In 2002, Tunie played Alberta Green in the first season of the Fox thriller series 24. In 2010, she made her directing debut with romantic comedy film See You in September. In 2012, she returned to film, playing Margaret Thomason in the Robert Zemeckis-directed drama Flight starring Denzel Washington. From 2014 to 2015, she was regular cast member in the Sundance TV drama series The Red Road.

Tunie won a Tony Award in 2007 for the production of the Broadway musical Spring Awakening; she has also won a Drama Desk Award. In 2016, she won an Obie Award for Distinguished Performance in Familiar, written by Danai Gurira.

From 2016 to 2018, Tunie had a recurring role as Monica Graham in the CBS police drama series Blue Bloods. In 2018, she was regular cast member in two series, ABC comedy drama Dietland and BBC Two/Netflix co-produced drama Black Earth Rising. In the latter she played Eunice Clayton, US Assistant Secretary of State for African Affairs. Her other television credits include The Good Wife, Survivor's Remorse, Better Call Saul, and Almost Family. Tunie also played Gugu Mbatha-Raw's mother in the 2018 romantic comedy-drama film Irreplaceable You. In 2022, she appeared as Cissy Houston in the biographical drama film Whitney Houston: I Wanna Dance with Somebody directed by Kasi Lemmons.

In 2022 she played Kamala Harris in The 47th at The Old Vic theater in London. In 2024, Tunie joined the cast of Beyond the Gates as family matriarch, Anita Dupree. The soap premiered in early 2025 on CBS.

She is the 2025-2026 Artist-In-Residence for MCG Jazz in Pittsburgh, Pennsylvania.

== Personal life ==
Tunie was married to Greg Bouquett from 1988 to 1991. From 1995 to 2018, she was married to jazz musician Gregory Generet. They separated in 2015. Her philanthropic activities include the Figure Skating in Harlem program, Harlem Stage/The Gatehouse, and God's Love We Deliver. In 2005, Mayor Michael Bloomberg awarded her the city's "Made in New York Award" for her support and commitment to film, television and theater in Manhattan.

== Filmography ==
=== Film ===
| Year | Title | Role | Notes |
|---|---|---|---|
| 1987 | Sweet Lorraine | Julie | |
| 1987 | Wall Street | Carolyn | |
| 1989 | Bloodhounds of Broadway | Cynthia Harris | |
| 1993 | Rising Sun | Lauren Smith | |
| 1996 | City Hall | Leslie Christos | |
| 1996 | Rescuing Desire | Van | |
| 1996 | Quentin Carr | Detective | Short film |
| 1997 | Spirit Lost | Anne | |
| 1997 | Eve's Bayou | Narrator | |
| 1997 | The Peacemaker | Jody | |
| 1997 | The Devil's Advocate | Mrs. Jackie Heath | |
| 1998 | Snake Eyes | Anthea, reporter | |
| 2001 | The Caveman's Valentine | Sheila Ledbetter | |
| 2007 | AfterLife | Nicole | Short film |
| 2012 | Missed Connections | Felicity Gray | |
| 2012 | Flight | Margaret Thomason | |
| 2014 | The Power of Our Presence | Narrator | Short film |
| 2014 | Fall to Rise | Annika | |
| 2016 | Bad Vegan and the Teleportation Machine | Josephine Bodder | |
| 2018 | Irreplaceable You | Jane | |
| 2018 | Her Only Choice | Brenda | |
| 2021 | A Journal for Jordan | Penny Canedy | |
| 2022 | Whitney Houston: I Wanna Dance with Somebody | Cissy Houston | |
| 2025 | Elio | Colonel Markwell (voice) | |
| 2025 | Looking Through Water | Estel Reno | |

=== Television ===
| Year | Title | Role | Notes |
|---|---|---|---|
| 1986 | Spenser: For Hire | Nina | Episode: "Shadowsight" |
| 1987–2007, 2009 | As the World Turns | Jessica Griffin | Contract role |
| 1993 | Tribeca | Pretoria "Tori" Thomas | Episodes: "The Box", "Honor", "The Rainmaker" |
| 1994–1997 | NYPD Blue | Lillian Fancy | Recurring role |
| 1995 | seaQuest DSV | Laura | Episode: "The Siamese Dream" |
| 1995 | New York Undercover | Janice | Episode: "Bad Girls" |
| 1996 | Swift Justice | Jessie McKenna | Episode: "Bad Medicine" |
| 1996 | Law & Order | Caroline Bennett | Episode: "Deadbeat" |
| 1996 | Rebound: The Legend of Earl "The Goat" Manigault | Miss Marcus | TV movie |
| 1997 | Feds | Martha Kershan | Episode: "Missing Pieces" |
| 1997 | Chicago Hope | Lennie Gaghan | Episode: "Leggo My Ego" |
| 1998 | New York Undercover | Lana Brooks | Episode: "Sign o' the Times" |
| 1999 | Sex and the City | Eileen | Episode: "The Cheating Curve" (Season 2 Episode 6) |
| 2000–2021 | Law & Order: Special Victims Unit | Dr. Melinda Warner | Recurring (Seasons 2–6, 13–17, 19, 21–23); Main (Seasons 7–12) |
| 2002 | 24 | Alberta Green | Recurring role |
| 2003 | Nefertiti Resurrected | Narrator | Documentary |
| 2005 | Law & Order: Trial by Jury | Dr. Melinda Warner | Episode: "Day" |
| 2011 | Days of Our Lives | Judge Weston | 2 episodes |
| 2013 | The Good Wife | Serafina Norvy | Episode: "Boom De Yah Da" |
| 2013 | Golden Boy | Mrs. Nevel | Episode: "Scapegoat" |
| 2014 | Alpha House | Eve Bettencourt / Eve Simone-Lewis | 2 episodes |
| 2014–2015 | The Red Road | Marie Van Der Veen | Main role |
| 2015 | Captain Blackout | Jessica Winters | TV movie |
| 2015 | Chicago Fire | Dr. Melinda Warner | Episode: "We Called Her Jellybean" |
| 2015 | Zoo | Brenda Montgomery | Episode: "First Blood" |
| 2015 | Survivor's Remorse | District Attorney Sandra Knowles | Episode: "A Time to Punch" |
| 2016 | Elementary | Lily Cooper | Episode: "Alma Matters" |
| 2016 | Billions | Amelia | Episode: "YumTime" |
| 2016–2018 | Blue Bloods | Monica Graham | Recurring role |
| 2017–2018 | Better Call Saul | Anita | 3 episodes |
| 2018 | Dietland | Julia Smith | Main role |
| 2018 | Black Earth Rising | Assistant Secretary Eunice Clayton | Main role |
| 2019–2020 | Almost Family | Genevieve Palmer | Recurring role |
| 2019 | Emergence | Maria Wilkis | 2 episodes |
| 2021–2022 | See | Nevla (The Bank) | 6 episodes |
| 2021 | Cowboy Bebop | Ana | 6 episodes |
| 2024–2025 | Law & Order: Organized Crime | Dr. Melinda Warner | 2 episodes |
| 2025–present | Beyond the Gates | Anita Dupree | Main role |

=== As a director ===
| Year | Title | Notes |
|---|---|---|
| 2010 | See You in September | Director, producer |

== Awards and nominations ==
List of awards and nominations
| Year | Organization | Category | Work(s) | Result | Ref. |
|---|---|---|---|---|---|
| 1995 | Soap Opera Digest Awards | Outstanding Supporting Actress | As the World Turns | Nominated | |
| 2002 | Independent Spirit Awards | Best Supporting Female | The Caveman's Valentine | Nominated | |
| 2003 | Soap Opera Digest Awards | Outstanding Supporting Actress | As the World Turns | Nominated | |
| 2003 | NAACP Image Award | Outstanding Actress in a Daytime Drama Series | As the World Turns | Nominated | |
| 2004 | NAACP Image Award | Outstanding Actress in a Daytime Drama Series | As the World Turns | Nominated | |
| 2012 | St. Louis Film Critics Association | Special Merit | Flight | Nominated | |
| 2013 | Black Reel Awards | Best Supporting Actress | Flight | Nominated | |
| 2016 | Obie Awards | Distinguished Performance | Familiar | Won | |
| 2026 | Daytime Emmy Awards | Outstanding Lead Actress in a Drama Series | Beyond the Gates | Won | |
