= Judy Prescott =

American actress and poet

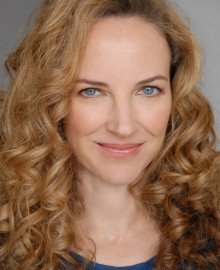
- Judy Prescott
- Born: Judith Neal Prescott; Mountain Lakes, New Jersey, U.S.
- Occupations: Actress, poet
- Years active: 1987–present
- Website: judyprescott.com

Judy Prescott is an American actress and poet. She has performed many roles on stage and screen since 1987 and is the author of the book Searching For Cecy: Reflections on Alzheimer's.

== Early life ==
Judith Neal Prescott, daughter of Mary Boodell Prescott and R. Donald Prescott Jr., was born in Glen Ridge, New Jersey. She grew up in Mountain Lakes, New Jersey, less than an hour outside of New York City, with her brothers Tom and John.

== Life and career ==
After graduating college, Prescott moved to New York City, where she began work as an actress in the theater. Upon her agent's suggestion, she moved to Los Angeles, where she got her first television job in the pilot episode of Roseanne. From here, Judy landed a series regular role on NBC's Working Girl alongside Sandra Bullock. Her most recent work includes episodes of True Blood, Grey's Anatomy, Cold Case, Bones, and the films Islander, and Hit and Runway.

Prescott is the author of Searching For Cecy: Reflections on Alzheimer's (2011). This collection of poetry explores her mother's unexpected journey into Alzheimer's and her own struggle to find peace. The book is illustrated by the art of four members of the Prescott family and a portion of its proceeds go to the Alzheimer's Association, Maine chapter.

== Filmography ==
Year	Title	Role	Notes
2006	Islander	Emily Bess	
2002	Bug	Alicia's Mom	
2000	Ladies Room L.A. (short)		
1999	Hit and Runway	Gwen Colton	
1990	Spontaneous Combustion	Student Director	
1989	Say Anything...	Partier	

== Television ==
Year	Title	Role	Notes
2010	Grey's Anatomy	Donna Bevell	Episode: "With You I'm Born Again "
2009	True Blood	Sue Ann Merlotte	Episode "Beyond Here Lies Nothin"
2008	True Blood	Sue Ann Merlotte	Episode "I Don't Wanna Know"
2007	Bones	Margie Shaw	Episode "Mummy in the Maze"
2004	Cold Case	Kelly Baxter	Episode "The Sleepover"
2004	Strong Medicine	Maya	Episode "Like Cures Like"
2004	Judging Amy	Gabby Weller	Episode "Sex, Lies and Expedia.com"
2002	The King of Queens	Simone	Episode "Connect Four"
2002	Six Feet Under	Kimberly Mossback	Episode "Driving Mr. Mossback"
2001	The Bernie Mac Show	Tracy	Episode "Bernie Mac, Ladies Man"
1999	Profiler	Nancy Langston	Episode "To Serve and Protect"
1998	Chicago Hope	Judy Sears	Episode "One Hundred and One Damnations"
1998	Mr. Murder	Jan the Gutheridge Receptionist	TV movie
1996	Ink	Lana	Episodes "Paper Cuts" and "Above the Fold"
1996	Caroline in the City	Audrey	Episode "Caroline and the Condom"
1993	Home Free	Eleanor	Episode "Pair O'Guys Lost"
1991	The Fresh Prince of Bel-Air	Gina	Episode "The Big Four-Oh"
1991	Herman's Head	Sarah	Episode "Isn't It Romantic?"
1991	Murder 101	Gail Gogerty	TV movie
1990	21 Jump Street		Episode "Back to School"
1990	Working Girl	Lana Peters (Series Regular)	Episodes: "Guess Who's Coming to Dinner", "Just One of Those Things", "Hungry Heart", "It's Only Love", "McJoe's", "Two's a Crowd", "Get Back","Oh, Brother", "We Can Work It Out", "Dream On", "I Heard It Through the Grapevine", "A Friend in Need"
1989	Baywatch	Liz	Episode "Message in a Bottle"
1989	Chicken Soup	Chris	Episode "Pilot"
1989	Perfect Strangers	Student #1	Episode "Teacher's Pest"
1989	The Case of the Hillside Stranglers	Phillipa Sameth	TV movie
1989	Murphy Brown	Mimi	Episode "My Dinner with Einstein"
1988, 2018	Roseanne	Miss Crane	Episodes "Life and Stuff", "Dress to Impress": Prescott appeared in the premiere in 1988. She did not appear again. In 2018, the program returned to produce new episodes and she appeared in one of those.
