= Frederick von Mierers =

American socialite and New Age group leader

- Born: December 25, 1946; Brooklyn, New York, U.S.
- Died: February 4, 1990 (aged 43); North Carolina, U.S.
- Occupations: Model, socialite, astrologer, spiritual leader
- Known for: Leader of Eternal Values

Frederick von Mierers (born as Freddy Miers or Fred Meyers on December 25, 1946 – February 4, 1990) was an American socialite, astrologer, and the leader of Eternal Values, a New Age cult active in New York in the 1980s.

== Life and career ==
Von Mierers was born in Brooklyn, New York. He briefly worked as a model in the late 1960s, changed his name, and became associated with New York high society. Vanity Fair later reported that he claimed aristocratic European ancestry, but that he was in fact Fred Meyers from Brooklyn, whose father ran a dry-cleaning business.

== Eternal Values ==
In the early 1980s, von Mierers established himself as an astrologer and claimed to be an "alien walk-in" from the star Arcturus, sent to prepare followers for a coming New Age. Von Mierers used his reputation as a New York socialite to recruit young models, students, and professionals into Eternal Values. One of its best-known members was model Hoyt Richards, who met von Mierers at age 16 and became involved in what Vanity Fair described as a "two-decade entanglement" with Eternal Values.

Reports about the group described strict rules governing diet, sex, money, and loyalty to von Mierers. Von Mierers also sold books, videos, cassettes, supplements, psychic astrology reading tapes, and expensive "gem prescriptions" whose stones he claimed had healing or spiritual properties. In March 1990, Vanity Fair published Marie Brenner's article "East Side Alien", which examined Eternal Values and a New York prosecutors' investigation into allegations that von Mierers had sold mystical gems with false appraisals.

== Death ==
Von Mierers died from AIDS-related complications on February 4, 1990, at age 43, after spending his final days at Eternal Values' property in Lake Lure, North Carolina. According to Biography, some former followers later alleged that an Eternal Values member suffocated von Mierers with a pillow as a mercy killing, but stated that the allegation had not been confirmed.

== Later media coverage ==
In 2026, HBO released the three-part documentary series Bring Me the Beauties: A Model Cult, directed by Chris Smith, which examined Hoyt Richards's involvement with Eternal Values and von Mierers. Time reported that the series drew on archival footage, new interviews with former members, and extensive conversations with Richards.
