= Hit and Runway =

- Directed by: Christopher Livingston
- Written by: Jaffe Cohen; Christopher Livingston
- Starring: Michael Parducci; Peter Jacobson; Judy Prescott
- Distributed by: Mirador Films
- Release date: 1999
- Running time: 110 minutes
- Country: United States
- Language: English

Hit and Runway is a 1999 American comedy film directed by Christopher Livingston. The film is a buddy comedy centred on the work relationship between Alex Andero (Michael Parducci), a young heterosexual Italian-American waiter, and Elliot Springer (Peter Jacobson), an older gay Jewish playwright, who meet and become friends despite their differences as they collaborate on Alex's idea for a screenplay about an undercover police officer posing as a fashion model.

The film was partially inspired by Livingston and cowriter Jaffe Cohen's own process of trying to hammer out their own differences as they began to collaborate on what would become the film's screenplay.

It won best screenplay at the 1999 Los Angeles Independent Film Festival.

== Cast ==
Actor	Role
Michael Parducci	Alex Andero
Peter Jacobson	Elliot Springer
Judy Prescott	Gwen Colton
Kerr Smith	Joey Worciuekowski
Hoyt Richards	Jagger Stevens
John Fiore	Frank Anderro
J. K. Simmons	Ray Tilman
Teresa DePriest	Lana
Jonathan Hogan	Bob
Bill Cohen	Norman Rizzoli
Rosemary De Angelis	Marie Andero
Marisa Redanty	Barbara
John DiResta	Bruno
Marian Quinn	Eileen
Stephen Singer	Rabbi Pinchas
Nicholas Kepros	Jack Springer
Jaffe Cohen	Comic Actor
David Drake	Michael
Bryan Batt	Carlos
Adoni Anastassopoulos	Villain
Cindy Guyer	Model Hostage
Jo-Jo Lowe	Renee
Hillel Meltzer	Woody
Ali Marsh	Geraldine
Mike Arotsky	Harold the Weightlifter
Andersen Gabrych	Gay Bartender
William Severs	Father McWilliams
David Tumblety	Priest
Florence Anglin	Aunt Lois
Bobo Lewis	Cousin Rosalie
Andrew Polk	Gary Shapiro
Alicia Minshew	TV Actress
Julia Novack	Jennifer Andero
Bobby Dicrisci	Justin Andero
Elizabeth Muller	Zoe Springer
Arthur M. Jolly	Villain 2
David Filippi	Taxi Driver
David Juskow	Woody (voice)
Emilu Klagsbrun	Additional Vocal Talents (voice)
Radium Cheung	Deli owner
Susan Cicchino	Girl in Bar (uncredited)
Marni Lustig	Andrea (uncredited)
