= Jeff Aquilon =

American male supermodel (born 1957)

- Born: 1957 (age 68–69); California, U.S.
- Occupations: Model, educator
- Known for: Male supermodel, Bruce Weber photography, Calvin Klein campaigns
- Children: 4
- Website: westmont.edu

Jeff Aquilon (born 1957) is an American male supermodel. His career in the late 1970s and 1980s was documented extensively in major fashion publications and photography archives.

== Career ==
Aquilon was discovered by photographer Bruce Weber in December 1978 during a casting at Pepperdine University in Malibu, California, where he was captain of the water polo team. Weber's portfolio of Aquilon appeared in the Soho Weekly News in December 1978. Aquilon made the cover of GQ magazine in May 1979 — the first time a male model had been featured on that cover as the primary subject. V Magazine later described this moment as significant in the history of male representation in fashion photography.

Aquilon's campaign roster included Calvin Klein, Versace, Polo Ralph Lauren, Pirelli, Abercrombie & Fitch, and Revlon. He appeared in editorial shoots for Vogue, Vanity Fair, Elle, Life, Interview, and Rolling Stone. Aquilon worked extensively with photographer Bruce Weber. Weber revisited Aquilon for L'Uomo Vogue in October 2006 — nearly thirty years after their first collaboration.

Aquilon was ranked #5 on Vogue Magazine's Top 25 Male Models Ever list. The Commercial Male included him in their list of The Greatest 25 Male Models.

== Personal life ==
Aquilon married model Nancy Donahue in the early 1980s and co-authored a fitness book titled One on One: Exercising Together, published by Simon & Schuster in 1984. He and Donahue later divorced.

He is currently married with four children and is based in Santa Barbara, California, where he serves as Director of Academic and Institutional Technology at Westmont College, a small Christian liberal arts college.
