= Bruno Santos (model) =

Brazilian model

- Born: Bruno Barbosa dos Santos; 31 August 1979 (age 47); Belo Horizonte, Minas Gerais, Brazil
- Occupations: Male Supermodel; activist; international businessman
- Years active: 2002–present
- Modeling information
- Height: 1.88 m (6 ft 2 in)
- Agency: Wilhelmina Los Angeles; Wilhelmina New York; Mega Model Agency Hamburg; I Love Models; Muse Management; D'Management Group; View Management

Bruno Barbosa dos Santos (born 31 August 1979), better known as Bruno Santos, is a Brazilian male supermodel, environmental activist and international businessman.

A model in a photo and fashion shows, Bruno gained notoriety in the mid-2000s, when he appeared in advertising campaigns and fashion events for major international brands, such as Guess, Versace, GQ, and Giorgio Armani, among others, working across multiple segments including underwear, fashion shows, eyewear, events, and fragrances. In 2002, he was ranked among the 10 most sought-after male models in the fashion world, and is listed on models.com. In 2009, German news site gateo.de profiled Santos during a visit to Munich, describing him as a leading international male model. Due to his prominence as a Brazilian male model, he was given the nickname "Gisele Bündchen in pants" by the Brazilian press.

Santos is notable for being the only male model selected to carry out two campaigns simultaneously for two competing fashion houses: Versace and Giorgio Armani, in addition to, in 2003, having opened the Ricardo Almeida fashion show at São Paulo Fashion Week, at which he received the highest male fee in the event's history at that time.

Santos is documented in the Male Model Index, an archival registry of male models organized into five tiers based on verified commercial participation. The Index's Editorial Review Board was unable to reach consensus on his tier placement; half placed him at No. 7 in Tier 1 ("Reference Figures"), while the other half placed him at No. 8 in Tier 2 ("Institutional Legends"). As a result, Santos was documented but left unranked, with his ordinal placement deferred to a future edition. The Consensus, a composite ranking published by The Commercial Male that cross-references eight independent ranking systems, also lists Santos as unranked due to the Board split.

== Biography ==
From a humble family (son of a self-employed trader and a public-school teacher, with four siblings), Bruno studied at a public school. In an interview for Fábio Bernardo magazine, Bruno said that "one of the reasons that led me not to miss a day of class was school lunch or breakfast, served at school after the second hour".

Upon finishing high school, Bruno passed the selection process at the Centro Federal de Educação Tecnológica (Cefet), in Minas Gerais state, to take the technical course in Engineering.

To help with the family's income, he worked as a popsicle salesman and as an office boy, did odd jobs in construction, schools, restaurants, did graphic services, and also worked in a storeroom and as a math teacher.

== Career ==
Bruno started his modelling career by chance in the year 2000. He received a proposal, but did not give much importance. The agent then made a new proposal, which turned out to be quite advantageous. In an interview for a newspaper from the Uberaba city called "Jornal Cidade", Bruno said that he accepted the proposal not for the work itself, but for the opportunity to learn another language and get to know a new culture, as the expenses would all be paid for by the agency.

From 2002 to 2005, he had an intense schedule, parading in major fashion events internationally.

At the end of 2005 until mid-2006, Bruno took a break from his work as a model to dedicate himself to personal and family projects, doing only occasional work.

From the 2010s onwards, Bruno started to accept only occasional jobs.

== Fashion events parades ==
In 2002, during that year's Milan Fashion Week, he opened and closed the shows for both Versace and Giorgio Armani. It was the first time a male model had run campaigns simultaneously for two competing fashion houses. At this event he also paraded for Iceberg.

In 2003, he modelled at São Paulo Fashion Week, opening the fashion show by stylist Ricardo Almeida, alongside Rodrigo Santoro and receiving the highest male fee in the event's history at that time, in addition to closing the ZOOMP fashion show, alongside supermodel Gisele Bündchen.

Also, in 2003, he modelled for Armani at Milan Fashion Week.

In 2004, at Paris Fashion Week, he modelled for designer John Galliano.

Also, in 2004, he modelled for Armani at Milan Fashion Week.

Also, in 2004, he modelled again for Armani, this time during New York Fashion Week.

In 2005, during Milan Fashion Week, he walked the runway for Armani.

Also, in 2005, at New York Fashion Week, he modelled for Versace.

In 2006, he modelled at New York Fashion Week at Versace's fall show.

In 2008, he modelled at New York Fashion Week at Nautica's Fall Show and Harmonte & Blaine's Spring Show.

In 2012, he modelled at Milan Fashion Week in the fall show for Ermanno Scervino.

In September 2023, he participated in the "VII Semana de la Moda" in the Spanish city of Estepona, parading and being honored in the fashion show by designer María Cano and being one of the judges at the event "IV Concurso de Jóvenes Diseñadores EDM (Estepona de Moda)".

=== Photos in advertising campaigns ===
Year	Magazine	Edition	Campaign	Info	Ref.
2002	(England) Arena HOMME +	March			
2003	(United States) Men's Journal	February			
2003	(United States) PAPER Magazine	March			
2003	(Chinese Taipei) GQ Taiwan	March			
2003	Several publications		autumn campaign of Versace		
2003	Several publications		spring campaign for Versace		
2003	Several publications		spring campaign for Emporio Armani	in the photo, Bruno appears next to Milla Jovovich	
2003	(France) Citizen K Magazine	December			
2004	Several publications		autumn campaign of Bloomingdales		
2004	Several publications		spring campaign for Emporio Armani's Underwear		
2004	Several publications		spring campaign for Kappa		
2004	Several publications		spring campaign for Giorgio Armani		
2004	Several publications		spring campaign for Versace Man (fragrance)		
2004	Several publications		spring campaign for Often		
2004	(Australia) Blue Magazine	January			
2004	(United States) GQ USA	January			
2004	(Chinese Taipei) GQ Taiwan	March			
2004	(Spain) Glamour España	March			
2004	(United States) FHM (For Him Magazine)	April			
2004	(Australia) Oyster Magazine	May			
2004	(China) Men's Uno	May			
2004	(England) i-D Magazine	July			
2004	(England) Loaded	November			
2004	(United States) V Magazine	December			
2009	Several publications		autumn advertising campaign for Guess		
2010	Several publications		spring advertising campaigns for Guess		
2010	Several publications		spring advertising campaign for Guess Jeans and Accessories	Photo next to Vanessa Hessler	
2010	Several publications		spring advertising campaign Trussardi		
2011	Several publications		advertising campaign for Jones New York		
2012	Several publications		Advertising campaign for Ermanno Scervino		
2012	Several publications		Spring/Summer 2012 advertising campaign for Riccovero	Photo next to Alyssa Miller	
2016	Several publications		fall-winter 2016-17 advertising campaign for Marciano Guess	In the photo is also present the Argentine model Belén Rodríguez	
2020	Several publications	Spring/Summer 2020 advertising campaign for MAKS (Saša Maksimiljanović)			

=== Magazines on the cover ===
Year	Magazine	Edition	Info	Ref.
2002	(Italy) Revista GQ	Special Edition	Cover	
2003	(Brazil) Revista Fotos & Festas	Special Edition	Cover	
2003	(Australia) DNA Magazine	Special Edition	Cover	
2004	(Canada) Fashion Magazine	Autumn/Winter Edition	Cover and interview	
2011	(Germany) Cocoon Magazine	May edition	Cover and interview	
2018	(Germany) Harbour Luxury Magazine	Edition I - Dec-Jan-Feb	Cover and interview	
2018	(Brazil) Revista Fábio Bernardo	Edition 6	Cover and interview	

=== Interviews/Reports in Printed Newspapers and/or Magazines ===
Year	Printed Newspaper/Magazine	Edition	Info	Ref.
2002	(Brazil) Jornal O Globo	30 November	Report	
2002	(Brazil) Jornal Estado de Minas	1 December	Report	
2003	(Brazil) Jornal Hoje em Dia (Belo Horizonte)	3 February	Report	
2003	(Brazil) Jornal Agora aos Domingos (Divinópolis-MG)	25 May	Report	
2003	(Brazil) Jornal Cidade (Uberaba-MG)	1 November	Report	
2004	(Brazil) Jornal Estado de Minas	8 February	Report	
2009	(United States) PAPER Magazine	Special Edition	Interview	
2011	(Brazil) Jornal Espaço Horizonte	Edition IV	Report	

=== Participation in TV shows ===
Year	TV Channel	TV Programme	Info	Ref.
2008	(Germany) RTL Television	Special programme "Exclusiv Spezial - Das Leben der Superreichen"	Bruno was interviewed. Episode aired on 9 August 2009	

== Environmental activism and encouragement of ecotourism ==
"My desire had nothing to do with making a fortune and my attachment to nature has always spoken louder and has accompanied me throughout my life".

— Bruno Santos, in an interview for Fábio Bernardo magazine

After reducing his schedule to fashion events, in the mid-2010s, Bruno started to dedicate a little more of his time to environmental causes. One of his first projects was to financially help the Associação dos Amigos dos Lajedos do Cariri Paraibano, which, among other things, gives lectures and classes in the region on ecotourism and environmental education.

In the microregion of Cariri Paraibano, Bruno defends the cause against the desertification that is taking place in the surroundings of Lajedo de Pai Mateus. Because of this, in this region, Bruno has a personal project of reforestation by the sea of several native trees with the objective of recovering degraded soil.

To encourage ecotourism in that region, Bruno carried out a fashion photography project at the famous Lajedo de Pai Mateus. Soon after this initiative, some companies, such as Cavalera, for example, started taking photos of their campaigns in this same location.
