= Bring Me the Beauties: A Model Cult =

American documentary series

- Genre: Documentary
- Directed by: Chris Smith
- Music by: Ian Hultquist
- Country of origin: United States
- Original language: English
- No. of episodes: 3

Production
- Executive producers: Chris Smith; Ryann Fraser; Nancy Abraham; Lisa Heller; Sara Rodriguez
- Cinematography: Britton Foster
- Editors: Nicholas Biagetti; Amanda Griffin; Andrew Doga
- Running time: 55-60 minutes
- Production companies: HBO Documentary Films; Library Films

Original release
- Network: HBO
- Release: June 1 – June 15, 2026

Bring Me the Beauties: A Model Cult is a 2026 television documentary series directed and executive produced by Chris Smith, premiering on June 1, 2026, on HBO. It follows Hoyt Richards who is pulled into the spiritual group Eternal Values, led by Frederick von Mierers.

== Premise ==
Hoyt Richards is pulled into the spiritual New Age group Eternal Values led by Frederick von Mierers, which preyed upon young models and professionals. It includes interviews with former members Paul Hinton, Dar Dixon and Elissa Melaragano, models Fabio Lanzoni, John Pearson (model) and Jacki Adams, alongside modeling agents and family members of Richards. The focus of the series is not to expose wrongdoing or hypocrisy but to look at different viewpoints; Smith said "For me, it was a genuine desire to understand all points of view. Life is rarely black and white."

The first episode is about the hope and promise of the group, the second is the downfall, and the third and final episode is about the aftermath.

== Soundscore ==
Episode 1 includes an excerpt from Erik Wøllo's “Pandrone,” heard when Hoyt gets into Princeton and discovers the new sense of freedom that college offers.

== Episodes ==
No.	Title	Directed by	Original release date	U.S. viewers (millions)
1	"The Promise"	Chris Smith	June 1, 2026	N/A
2	"The Antichrist Tapes"	Chris Smith	June 8, 2026	N/A
3	"Mind Games"	Chris Smith	June 15, 2026	N/A

== Reception ==
On the review aggregator website Rotten Tomatoes, the series holds an approval rating of 100%, based on 8 reviews, with an average of rated reviews of 7.00/10. Metacritic, which uses a weighted average, assigned a score of 73 out of 100 based on 5 critics, indicating "generally favorable" reviews.

John Anderson of The Wall Street Journal wrote: "Smith is an insightful filmmaker and “Bring Me the Beauties” is a stylishly constructed parable about naivete and spiritual emptiness." Karina Adelgaard of Heaven of Horror gave the series 3 out of 5, writing: "A well-made documentary about a topic that I can’t seem to tire of."
