= The Juror =

- Theatrical release poster
- Directed by: Brian Gibson
- Screenplay by: Ted Tally
- Based on: The Juror by George Dawes Green
- Produced by: Irwin Winkler
- Starring: Demi Moore; Alec Baldwin; James Gandolfini; Lindsay Crouse
- Cinematography: Jamie Anderson
- Edited by: Robert M. Reitano
- Music by: James Newton Howard
- Production company: Columbia Pictures
- Distributed by: Sony Pictures Releasing
- Release date: February 2, 1996
- Running time: 118 minutes
- Country: United States
- Language: English
- Budget: $44 million
- Box office: $63 million

The Juror is a 1996 American legal thriller film based on the 1995 novel by George Dawes Green. It was directed by Brian Gibson and stars Demi Moore as a single mother picked for jury duty for a mafia trial and Alec Baldwin as a mobster sent to intimidate her. The film received highly negative reviews and Moore won a joint Golden Raspberry Award for Worst Actress for both her performance in this film and in Striptease.

== Plot ==
Annie Laird is a New York City sculptor who lives with her son Oliver and works a day job as a data entry clerk. Annie is selected to be a juror in the trial of crime boss Louie Boffano, who is accused of ordering the murders of federal informant Salvatore Riggio, his wife and his young son Tommy.

A rich tourist, Mark Cordell, buys some of Annie's artwork and then wines and dines her before she discovers he is better known as "The Teacher," Boffano's enforcer and the man responsible for the Riggio murders. Mark tells Annie to persuade the jury to acquit Boffano, or she and Oliver will die. Fellow gangster Eddie then sends Mark's car with a victim over a cliff, further frightening Annie into convincing the jury to acquit Boffano through sheer force of personality and persuasiveness.

After the trial, Boffano questions whether Annie should "disappear", seeing her as a loose end. Mark convinces Boffano otherwise, as he has become obsessed with her. After having sex with Annie's close friend Juliet, Mark reveals himself to be Annie's stalker. He pulls a gun and forces Juliet to take a fatal drug overdose. Mark boasts of the murder to Eddie, who proves to be sympathetic to Annie as he is a parent himself and increasingly disturbed by Mark's behavior.

To ensure her son's safety, Annie buys a ticket for him to T'ui Cuch, a rural village in Guatemala where she had previously studied artwork with the local community. The prosecutor on Boffano's case, who figured out Annie was threatened, wants Annie to turn state's witness so they can go after Mark, as they suspect him of planning to murder his boss.

Annie convinces the prosecutor to let her wear a wire before calling Mark to reciprocate his affections. Annie then secretly gives Eddie the wire, insinuating she and Mark are now a couple and that she does not want him to be arrested. With Eddie's help, she tricks Mark into incriminating himself in a boastful rant about his ambitions, which she tapes and gives to Boffano. The boss then orders Mark to a meeting where he will be whacked.

Boffano's plan backfires when Mark, seizing the opportunity, kills Boffano with a car bomb and guns down his son Joseph, before cutting Eddie's throat. Mark, furious at Annie's betrayal, calls her and reveals his intention to travel to Guatemala to kill Oliver.

Annie travels to Guatemala where there is a showdown with Mark. He chases Oliver into a structure, where the locals are able to ambush and disable Mark. Annie gets hold of his gun, and when Mark tries to pull a weapon from his ankle holster, she kills him in a blind frenzy. Oliver is unharmed, and he and his mother return home.

== Cast ==
- Demi Moore as Annie Laird
- Alec Baldwin as Vincent "The Teacher" / Mark Cordell
- James Gandolfini as Eddie
- Joseph Gordon-Levitt as Oliver Laird
- Lindsay Crouse as US Attorney Tallow
- Anne Heche as Juliet
- Tony Lo Bianco as Louie Boffano
- Michael Rispoli as Joseph Boffano
- Matthew Cowles as Rodney
- Matt Craven as Boone
- Frank Adonis as DeCicco
- Michael Constantine as Judge Weitzel
- Polly Adams as Jury Forewoman
- Jack Gilpin as Accountant, Juror
- Chuck Cooper as Stockbroker, Juror
- Charle Landry as Musician, Juror
- Tom Signorelli as Locksmith, Juror
- Frances Foster as Housewife, Juror
- Robin Moseley as Matron, Juror
- Julie Halston as Inez
- Todd Susman as Boezman
- Rosemary De Angelis as Mrs. Riggio
- Joe Perrino as Tommy Riggio
- James McCauley as Carew
- William Hill as Walters
- Chuck Zito as Frankie

== Production ==
Columbia Pictures acquired the film rights to the unpublished book for $1.5 million. They then paid Ted Tally over $1 million to write the screenplay.

== Reception ==
=== Critical response ===
The Juror was a critical failure. It holds a 22% approval rating on Rotten Tomatoes based on 23 reviews, with an average rating of 4.5/10. The site's consensus states: "Self-serious despite its abundance of trite twists, The Juror is a drab thriller that audiences may hold in contempt." Moore won a joint Razzie Award for Worst Actress for both her performance in this film and in Striptease. She was also nominated for the same joint award at the 1996 Stinkers Bad Movie Awards but lost to Whoopi Goldberg for Theodore Rex, Eddie, and Bogus. Audiences surveyed by CinemaScore gave the film a grade of "B+" on a scale of A+ to F.

=== Box office ===
The film grossed $22.7 million in the United States and Canada and $63 million worldwide, against its $44 million budget.
