= Luz Pavon =

Mexican model and fashion designer

- Born: Luz Pavon; Mexico
- Occupations: Model; Businesswoman
- Modeling information
- Height: 1.75 m (5 ft 9 in)
- Hair color: Brown
- Eye color: Brown
- Agencies: Select Model Management (Paris), View Management (Spain)

Luz Pavon is a Mexican supermodel. Models.com ranks her as one of the highest earners of the industry. Pavon has achieved to be the face of the best beauty brands worldwide and featured in numerous international Vogue covers making her the most accomplished model from her country.

== Biography ==
=== Model career ===
At an early age Pavon was determined to leave her native Mexico and move to New York, few weeks later while walking in the streets of SoHo, Manhattan she was discovered by a scout and within a short time she worked with companies such as Dior, L'Oréal and Estée Lauder.

=== Early life ===
Before Luz became a model she partnered with her sister and founded a fashion business in New York, they were designing wardrobe pieces and created a dress called "The Ruffle Tube Dress" soon after it became a hit and a best seller when stylist Patricia Field from Sex and the City featured it on the show.

=== Lyme disease ===
Pavon was bedridden and unable to work for some time due to her battle with late stage chronic Lyme disease. Luz is still modeling and focusing on personal projects, art, altruism and supporting sufferers of chronic pain and incurable illnesses.
