= The Caveman's Valentine =

2001 film by Kasi Lemmons

- Theatrical release poster
- Directed by: Kasi Lemmons
- Screenplay by: George Dawes Green
- Based on: The Caveman's Valentine by George Dawes Green
- Produced by: Michael Shamberg; Danny DeVito; Scott Frank; Elie Samaha; Stacey Sher; Andrew Stevens
- Starring: Samuel L. Jackson; Colm Feore; Aunjanue Ellis
- Cinematography: Amelia Vincent
- Edited by: Terilyn A. Shropshire
- Music by: Terence Blanchard
- Production company: Jersey Shore
- Distributed by: Universal Focus
- Release date: March 2, 2001
- Running time: 105 minutes
- Country: United States
- Language: English
- Budget: $13.5 million
- Box office: $687,194

The Caveman's Valentine is a 2001 American mystery-drama film directed by Kasi Lemmons and starring Samuel L. Jackson based on George Dawes Green's 1994 novel of the same name. The film was released by Universal Focus, a subsidiary of Universal Studios, which would later become Focus Features.

== Plot ==
A former family man and pianist studying at Juilliard music school, Romulus Ledbetter, now has paranoid schizophrenia and lives in a cave in Inwood Park, New York. He believes that a man named Cornelius Gould Stuyvesant is controlling the world with rays from the top of the Chrysler Building, and that his mind is inhabited by moth-like seraphs. On Valentine’s Day, he discovers the frozen body of a young man, Scotty Gates, left in a tree outside his cave. The police, including Romulus's daughter Lulu, dismiss the man's death as an accident. However, a homeless ex-lover of Scotty tells Romulus that he was murdered by the famous photographer David Leppenraub. Determined to discover the truth behind Scotty’s death and prove his worth to his daughter, Romulus manages to get an invitation through a former friend to perform one of his compositions at Leppenraub’s farm. What unfolds thereafter is a twisted tale of mystery, deception, and a man's struggle against his own mind.

== Cast ==
- Samuel L. Jackson as Romulus Ledbetter
- Colm Feore as David Leppenraub
- Aunjanue Ellis as Officer Lulu Ledbetter
- Tamara Tunie as Sheila Ledbetter
- Jay Rodan as Joey Peasley
- Ann Magnuson as Moira Leppenraub
- Anthony Michael Hall as Bob
- Sean MacMahon as Scotty Gates
- Jeff Geddis as Paul
- Rodney Eastman as Matthew

== Release ==
=== Box office ===
The Caveman’s Valentine opened in limited release on March 2, 2001, and grossed $112,041 on its opening weekend. After 15 weeks in theaters, the film grossed $687,194.

=== Critical reception ===
On review aggregator Rotten Tomatoes, the film has an approval rating of 46% based on 85 reviews. The website's critical consensus reads, "The Caveman's Valentine has an intriguing premise, but the film falls flat under the weight of its ambition." Metacritic, which uses a weighted average, assigned the film a score of 44 out of 100, based on 27 critics, indicating "mixed or average" reviews.

=== Awards ===
In 2002, Tamara Tunie was nominated for the Independent Spirit Award for Best Supporting Female.
