= All These Wonders =

Stories associated with "The Moth" radio program

The Moth Presents: All These Wonders. True Stories About Facing the Unknown
- First edition
- Editor: Catherine Burns
- Language: English
- Publisher: Crown Archetype
- Publication date: March 21, 2017
- Pages: 336
- ISBN: 978-1-101-90440-4
- Website: All These Wonders

The Moth Presents: All These Wonders. True Stories About Facing the Unknown is a 2017 collection of stories from the radio program The Moth, edited by the show's artistic director Catherine Burns on the 20th anniversary of the show's 1997 founding. The 336-page collection of 45 stories was published by Crown Archetype. The title story, "All These Wonders", is by planetary scientist Cathy Olkin.

== Reception ==
Reviewing the collection for The New York Times, Michiko Kakutani said most of the stories, all initially told on the radio, "have translated seamlessly to the page [and] possess a remarkable emotional depth and sincerity. The stories vary greatly in tone and voice — by turns, raw, wry, rueful, comic, elliptical and confiding — but there is little sarcasm or snark. The emphasis is on communicating with the audience, with sharing an experience, a memory, a moment of grace." In the Toronto Star, Sarah Murdoch said, "Each makes the transition from stage to page without a stumble. A delight." In Paste Magazine, Jason Rhode's review was mixed, saying, "I give three-quarters of All These Wonders my highest praise, and the remaining quarter a curt dismissal." He particularly noted stories by Ishmael Beah and Kate Braestrup, and those centered on "ordinary people who have been through miraculous or terrible events. These are fragments of beauty." He also praised stories from "academics and people with interesting jobs who have insightful thoughts on the world" and "entertainment professionals who are practiced masters of their craft," but criticized the remaining quarter as "facile, self-deprecating bundles of humblebrag."
