= StorySLAM =

The StorySLAM is a live storytelling competition in the vein of poetry slams organized by The Moth, a non-profit literary society from New York City, since 2001. Storytellers (slammers) have 5 minutes each to tell a story, based on a theme chosen for the event. No notes are allowed: stories must be told and not read. The events, held in cities around the United States, now also include a competition; participants are judged by teams of audience members. The organization also holds a biannual Grand Slam competition.

Notables performing at StorySLAMs include Moby, Lili Taylor, and Frank McCourt.

== Locations ==
- United States
  - Ann Arbor, Michigan
  - Asheville, North Carolina
  - Boston, Massachusetts
  - Burlington, Vermont
  - Washington, D.C.
  - Chicago, Illinois
  - Denver, Colorado
  - Detroit, Michigan
  - Houston, Texas
  - Los Angeles, California
  - Louisville, Kentucky
  - Madison, Wisconsin
  - Miami, Florida
  - Milwaukee, Wisconsin
  - New Orleans, Louisiana
  - New York City, New York
  - Philadelphia, Pennsylvania
  - Pittsburgh, Pennsylvania
  - Portland, Oregon
  - San Francisco, California
  - Seattle, Washington
  - Twin Cities, Minnesota
- International:
  - Bristol, England
  - Dublin, Ireland
  - London, England
  - Melbourne, Australia
  - Sydney, Australia
  - Krakòw, Poland
