= John Pearson (model) =

British male supermodel and entrepreneur (born 1965)

- Born: 1965 (age 60–61); Hull, Yorkshire, England
- Occupations: Model, entrepreneur
- Known for: Male supermodel, Calvin Klein campaigns, Freedom! '90 music video
- Spouse: Alison Edmond
- Children: 3
- Website: mrfeelgood.com

John Pearson (born 1965) is a British male supermodel and entrepreneur. His career spans over three decades in the fashion industry.

== Career ==
Pearson was born and raised in Hull, Yorkshire, England. He was discovered at age 18 while working as a manager of a denim store in his hometown, when a photographer approached him and offered to photograph him, launching his career. After initial work in London and Tokyo, Pearson moved to New York in 1986 at age 21, where he immediately began booking major campaigns and editorial work.

Pearson worked as a top male model through the 1990s and beyond. His campaign clients included Ralph Lauren, Donna Karan, Valentino, Burberry, Levi's, Gap, and Perry Ellis. His career spanned over three decades with hundreds of major advertising campaigns and editorial features.

Pearson appeared in editorial work for GQ magazine across multiple decades. He has been photographed by photographers including Steven Meisel, Mario Testino, David Bailey, Peter Lindbergh, Bruce Weber, Patrick Demarchelier, Helmut Newton, Arthur Elgort, Mikael Jansson, Michael Thompson, Ellen von Unwerth, Pamela Hanson, and Herb Ritts.

=== Cultural impact ===
In 1990, Pearson appeared in George Michael's music video for "Freedom! '90", directed by David Fincher, alongside supermodels Linda Evangelista, Naomi Campbell, Christy Turlington, Cindy Crawford, and Tatjana Patitz. The Sunday Times named him "The World's First Male Supermodel." Interview magazine described him as an "Industry Legend," and AnOther Magazine named him "Iconic Male Model of All Time."

== Entrepreneurship and later career ==
In 2020, Pearson co-founded Mr. Feelgood, a digital lifestyle and personal development magazine, alongside journalist Pete Samson and creative director Alison Edmond. The platform covers lifestyle, wellness, mental health, culture, and style.

In June 2026, the HBO series Bring Me the Beauties: A Model Cult directed by Chris Smith documented the Eternal Values spiritual group and featured interviews with Pearson and other former members discussing the group's influence on the modeling industry.

== Personal life ==
Pearson has been married for over 20 years to Alison Edmond, a noted stylist, whom he met as a teenager in Yorkshire. He is a father of three and is based in Los Angeles.
