= Islander (film) =

- Poster
- Directed by: Ian McCrudden
- Written by: Ian McCrudden; Thomas Hildreth
- Produced by: Thomas Hildreth; Forrest Murray
- Starring: Thomas Hildreth; Amy Jo Johnson; Mark Kiely; Larry Pine; James Parks; Ron Canada; Judy Prescott; Philip Baker Hall
- Cinematography: Dan Coplan
- Edited by: Marc Jozefowicz
- Music by: Billy Mallery
- Distributed by: Down East Films
- Release date: June 25, 2006 (LA Film Festival)
- Running time: 103 minutes
- Country: United States
- Language: English

Islander is a 2006 American drama film directed by Ian McCrudden and starring Thomas Hildreth, Amy Jo Johnson, Mark Kiely, Larry Pine, James Parks, Ron Canada, Judy Prescott and Philip Baker Hall.

== Plot ==
Maine lobsterman Eben Cole discharges his weapon in the direction of another fishing vessel. As a result, a deckhand on the other vessel is thrown overboard and drowns. Cole goes to prison and loses his family, friends and stature in his island fishing community. He returns to the island an outcast but determined to win back the way of life he fought so hard to protect. Set against the stunning backdrop of the Maine coast, Islander captures the grit and integrity of this hard working community and celebrates man's unerring need for redemption.

== Cast ==
- Thomas Hildreth as Eben Cole
- Amy Jo Johnson as Cheryl
- Mark Kiely as Jimmy
- Larry Pine as Old Man Cole
- James Parks as Pokey
- Ron Canada as T. Hardy
- Judy Prescott as Emily Bess
- Philip Baker Hall as Popper
- Emma Ford as Sara
- Zach Batchelder as Wyatt Bess
- Mackenzie Young as Young Sara

== Release ==
The film premiered at the LA Film Festival on June 25, 2006.

== Reception ==
The film has an 88% rating on Rotten Tomatoes based on eight reviews.

Justin Chang of Variety gave the film a positive review and wrote, "Without spelling itself out too emphatically, pic movingly acknowledges the redeeming bonds of friendship within an enclosed community, as well as the importance of making peace with one’s decisions and moving on."

Wesley Morris of The Boston Globe also gave the film a positive review and wrote, "It's a small, plaintive, modestly made film about how one bad decision can wreck a life."
