= Rosemary De Angelis =

American actress (1933–2020)

- Born: April 26, 1933; Brooklyn, New York, U.S.
- Died: April 16, 2020 (aged 86)
- Occupation: Actress
- Years active: 1974–2020

Rosemary De Angelis (April 26, 1933 – April 16, 2020) was an American stage, screen, and television actress.

== Early life ==
Rosemary De Angelis was born on April 26, 1933, in Brooklyn, New York, to Francis and Antoinette (née Donofrio) De Angelis.

== Career ==
De Angelis made her film debut at age 41 in Columbia Pictures' For Pete's Sake in 1974. She appeared in The Last Detail that same year and the PBS television special, Monkey, Monkey. In 1977, she played the role of the Mother in the play The Transformation of Benno Blimpie at the Astor Place Theatre in New York City. She won a Drama Desk Award for her performance.

In 1978, De Angelis was cast as Mrs. D'Amato on the NBC television series The Doctors. In 1979, she was in minor roles in the films Just Me and You and The Wanderers. In 1982, she played the recurring role of Millie on CBS' Baker's Dozen. In 1983, she played a welfare worker in the ABC television movie Enormous Changes at the Last Minute.

In 1985, De Angelis had two leading roles onstage, Vera Vasilyevna in The Nest of the Woodgrouse at the New York Shakespeare Festival and the Kennedy Center, among other venues. She played Mistress Overdone in Measure for Measure at the Delacorte Theatre.

That same year, she appeared as Nina in Out of the Darkness. In 1986, she appeared as Jean Blake in the television show Another World and Mrs. Portman in the television show The Equalizer. In 1987, De Angelis appeared as Catherine Reardon in And Miss Reardon Drinks a Little at the Missouri Repertory Theatre in Kansas City, Missouri. In 1991, she guest-starred on Law & Order in the episode "Misconceptions" as Dr. Mishon. She returned for one episode on that show the next year.

In 1993, she appeared in the movie Household Saints. In 1994, she played the role of Aunt Vicky in Angie. In 1996, she played Mrs. Riggio in the film The Juror. In 1998, played Patsy Fortunato in the TV mini-series The Last Don II, and, in 2012, she appeared in "Domestic Disturbance" the second episode of the third season of the TV show Blue Bloods as Mrs. Goldfarb.

== Filmography ==
=== Film ===
Year	Title	Role	Notes
1979	The Wanderers	Waitress	
1983	Enormous Changes at the Last Minute	Welfare Worker	
1987	Deadly Illusion	Woman Applicant	
1993	Household Saints	Older Mother	
1994	Angie	Aunt Vicky	
1995	Two Bits	Mrs. Conte	
1996	The Juror	Mrs. Riggio	
1999	Hit and Runway	Marie Andero	
2000	Two Family House	Marie	
2000	Frequency	Mrs. Finelli	
2008	Public Interest	Old Woman	
2009	Little New York	Gianina Tarzo	
2010	The Harvest	Giuilia	

=== Television ===
Year	Title	Role	Notes
1974	Great Performances	Louise Amber	1 episode
1978	The Doctors	Mrs. D'Amato	5 episodes
1985	Out of the Darkness	Nina	Television film
1985	The Equalizer	Irma Portman	Episode: "Reign of Terror"
1991–2002	Law & Order	Various roles	6 episodes
1998	The Last Don II	Patsy Fortunato	2 episodes
2001	100 Centre Street		3 episodes
2004	Law & Order: Criminal Intent	Melanie	Episode: "In the Dark"
2008	Law & Order: Special Victims Unit	Mrs. Tillman	Episode: "Signature"
2011	The Confession	Woman in Church #2	2 episodes
2012	Blue Bloods	Mrs. Goldfarb	Episode: "Domestic Disturbance"
2015	Orange Is the New Black	Pinchie Patterson	Episode: "Empathy Is a Boner Killer"
