= Working Girl (TV series) =

American television series

- Genre: Sitcom
- Created by: Kimberly Hill; Tom Patchett
- Written by: Sandy Frank; Vicki S. Horwitz; Lawrence Konner; Lisa Rosenthal; Robin Schiff
- Directed by: Robert Berlinger; Matthew Diamond
- Starring: Sandra Bullock; Patrick Brock; Nana Visitor; Judy Prescott; George Newbern; Edye Byrde; Tom O'Rourke; Anthony Tyler Quinn; David Schramm; B.J. Ward
- Theme music composer: Carly Simon
- Opening theme: "Let the River Run"
- Composer: W. G. Snuffy Walden
- Country of origin: United States
- Original language: English
- No. of seasons: 1
- No. of episodes: 12 (4 unaired)

Production
- Executive producers: Kenneth Kaufman; Tom Patchett
- Producers: Vicki S. Horwitz; Lawrence Konner
- Editors: Leslie Dennis Bracken; Steve Cioffi
- Camera setup: Multi-camera
- Running time: 30 minutes
- Production companies: Patchett Kaufman Entertainment; 20th Television

Original release
- Network: NBC
- Release: April 16 – July 30, 1990

Related
- Working Girl

Working Girl is an American sitcom television series that aired on NBC from April 16 to July 30, 1990. Loosely based on the 1988 film of the same name starring Melanie Griffith, the series stars Sandra Bullock as Tess McGill (Melanie Griffith's character), a role that was initially meant as a starring vehicle for Nancy McKeon.

== Synopsis ==
Tess McGill is a spunky, independent secretary who has suddenly become a junior executive after she charms company owner A.J. Trask. Tess' first challenge is to survive working with her antagonistic, uptight immediate boss, Mrs. Bryn Newhouse, otherwise known as the "company witch." Tess's best friend, Lana Peters, is a secretary who is more interested in doing her nails and rooting for Tess than in getting ahead herself. Meanwhile, Everett Rutledge is a fellow junior executive who is charming but eager to please. Libby Wentworth is Tess's world-wise "permanent temporary" secretary who is also a moonlighting musician. Back home each night on Staten Island, Tess has to contend with her doting parents, Joe and Fran. Tess also has to contend with Sal Pascarella, the blue-collar neighborhood Romeo who constantly pursues her.

== Reception and cancelation ==
Debuting as a midseason replacement, Working Girl drew low ratings and was canceled after eight of the twelve episodes produced aired.

== Cast ==
- Sandra Bullock as Tess McGill
- Patrick Brock as Office Regular
- Nana Visitor as Bryn Newhouse
- Judy Prescott as Lana Peters
- George Newbern as Everett Rutledge
- Eyde Byrde as Libby Wentworth
- Tom O'Rourke as A.J. Trask
- Anthony Tyler Quinn as Sal Pascarella
- David Schramm as Joe McGill
- B.J. Ward as Fran McGill

== Episodes ==
No.	Title	Directed by	Written by	Original release date
1	"Dream On"	Matthew Diamond	Lawrence Konner, Robin Schiff	April 16, 1990
2	"I Heard It Through the Grapevine"	Matthew Diamond	Vicki S. Horwitz	April 23, 1990
3	"A Friend in Need"	Matthew Diamond	Lisa Rosenthal	April 30, 1990
4	"McJoe's"	Matthew Diamond	Sandy Frank	May 7, 1990
5	"It's Only Love"	Matthew Diamond	Robin Schiff	May 14, 1990
6	"Hungry Heart"	Matthew Diamond	Vicki S. Horwitz	July 16, 1990
7	"Just One of Those Things"	Matthew Diamond	Robin Schiff	July 23, 1990
8	"We Can Work It Out"	Unknown	Rachel Gamss	July 30, 1990
9	"Get Back" "Back in the Saddle Again"	N/A	Story edited by Sandy Frank	Unaired
10	"Two's a Crowd"	N/A	Sandy Frank, Lawrence Konner, Lisa Rosenthal, Robin Schiff	Unaired
11	"Guess Who's Coming to Dinner"	N/A	Vicki S. Horwitz	Unaired
12	"Oh, Brother"	N/A	Story by : Lawrence Konner; Teleplay by : Beverly Archer	Unaired

== Production ==
The series was created by Kimberly Hill and Tom Patchett. Kenneth Kaufman and Tom Patchett served as executive producers.

"Let the River Run" (which was also featured in the motion picture) was the series' theme song.

== Syndication ==
The series briefly reran on TV Land in the 1990s after Bullock became a major motion-picture star.
