= The Moth =

Storytelling events, podcast, radio program, books, and website

The Moth Radio Hour
- Other names: The Moth
- Genre: Storytelling
- Running time: 60 minutes
- Country of origin: United States
- Language: English
- Syndicates: Public Radio Exchange
- Hosted by: Sarah Austin Jenness; Jenifer Hixson; Meg Bowles; Suzanne Rust; Chloe Salmon; Kate Tellers; Jodi Powell; Michelle Jalowski; George Dawes Green
- Produced by: Jay Allison
- Executive producer: Sarah Haberman
- Original release: 2009 – Present
- No. of series: 14
- No. of episodes: 285
- Opening theme: The Drift – "Uncanny Valley"
- Website: themoth.org
- Podcast: The Moth podcast

The Moth is a nonprofit group based in New York City, dedicated to the craft of storytelling. Founded in 1997, the organization presents a wide range of theme-based storytelling events across the United States and abroad, often featuring prominent literary and cultural personalities alongside everyday people like veterans, astronauts, school teachers, and parents. The Moth offers a weekly podcast and in 2009 launched a National Public Radio show, The Moth Radio Hour, which won a 2010 Peabody Award. The Moth has published four books, including The Moth: 50 True Stories (2013), which reached #22 on The New York Times Paperback Nonfiction Best-Seller List; All These Wonders: True Stories about Facing the Unknown (2017); Occasional Magic: True Stories About Defying the Impossible (2019); and How to Tell a Story: The Essential Guide to Memorable Storytelling from The Moth (2022). In September 2022, The Moth published an interactive card deck, A Game of Storytelling, which debuted at #1 on Amazon's top-selling card game list.

== Origins ==
The Moth was founded in 1997 by poet and novelist George Dawes Green, who wanted to recreate the feeling of sultry summer evenings in his native Georgia, when moths were attracted to the light on the porch where he and his friends would gather to spin spellbinding tales. Green and his original group of storytellers called themselves "The Moths", and Green took the name with him to New York City. The non-profit organization now runs over 600 different storytelling events a year in more than 27 US cities (including New York City, Los Angeles, Chicago, and Detroit) and two cities outside the US (London and Melbourne) offering the unique perspectives of both average, everyday people, and literary or cultural personalities.

== Live events ==
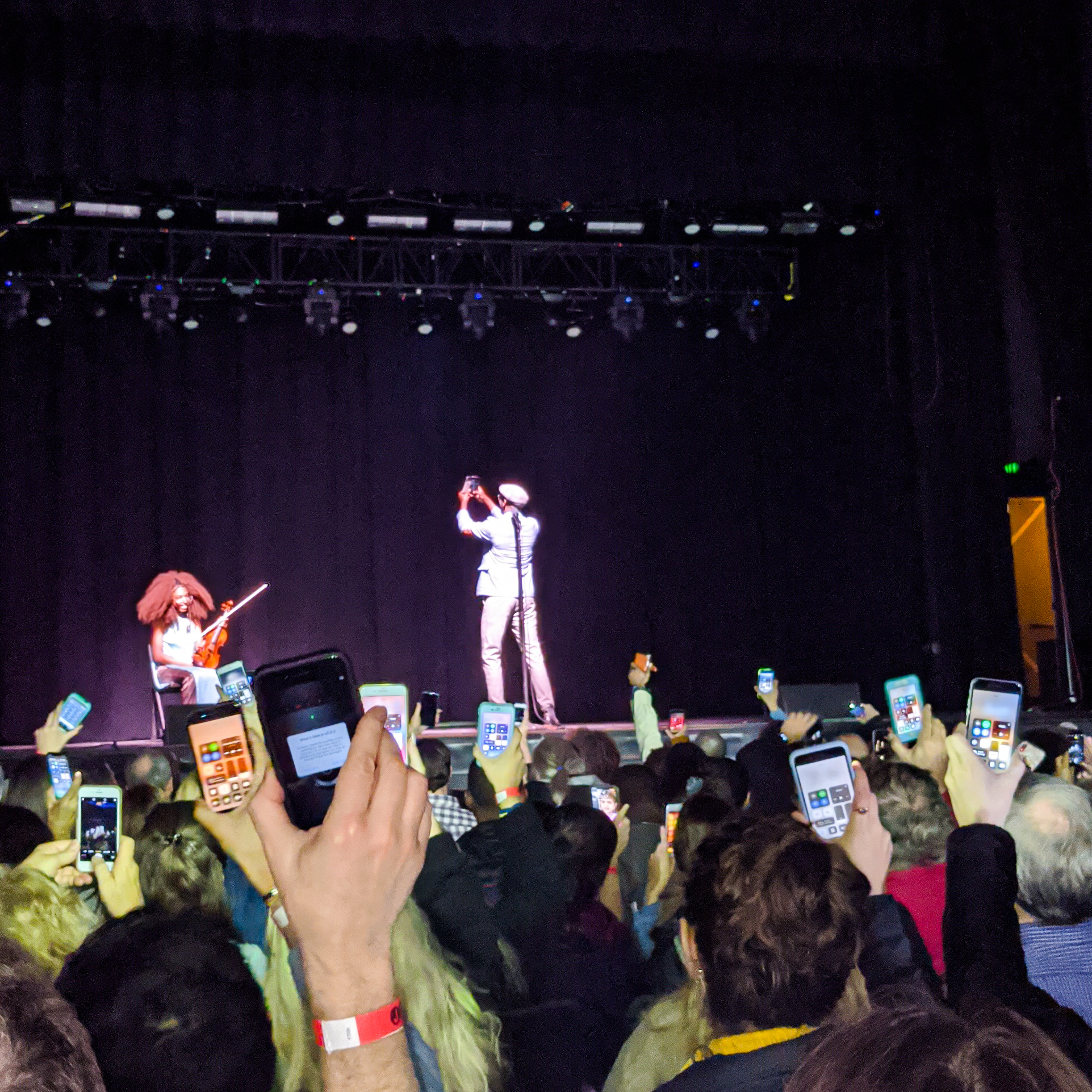
Phones up, then off – The Moth event in New Orleans, 2019

The Moth's live shows fall into several tiers of production, but each is dedicated to the art of unscripted, first-person storytelling. Every show has stories based on open-ended themes (Such as "Love Hurts," Holding on and Letting go," "Hot Mess," or "Conviction").

=== Mainstage ===
The Moth Mainstage is their curated flagship program, which is a "staple" of the literary scenes in New York City and Los Angeles and tours the world including 40 U.S. cities and London, Toronto, Nairobi, and Melbourne. Storytellers at the Mainstages include renowned personalities, past StorySLAM or GrandSLAM winners, and anyone who may have submitted their stories through The Moth Pitchline.

=== StorySLAMS and GrandSLAMS ===
The organization also hosts The Moth StorySLAM events, which are open mic storytelling competitions open to everyone in 27 cities across the United States, including but not limited to New York City, Detroit, Chicago, Houston, Louisville, Ann Arbor, Pittsburgh, Miami, Cambridge, and Los Angeles. The format was inspired by and is similar to poetry slams.

For the StorySLAM, ten participants are chosen at random from a pool of volunteer storytellers to tell a true story (without notes) in the five minute range. Storytellers are scored based on the content of their stories, and their storytelling abilities, by three teams of judges—selected from audience members—on a scale from one to ten. The storyteller with the highest score wins the StorySLAM.

After 10 StorySLAMS have occurred in a city, the 10 winners then advance to The Moth GrandSLAM, which draws crowds of hundreds (or thousands) and as a result is held in a larger venue than the monthly StorySLAMs. The same rules apply to the GrandSLAM as in the StorySLAM.

== Programs ==
In addition to live performances, The Moth conducts a variety of community, education, and corporate workshops that teach the art and craft of storytelling in various regions and communities.

=== Community Engagement Program ===
Since 1999, the Moth's Community Program strives to encourage the art of storytelling in communities typically under-represented by the mainstream media. They teach and inspire budding raconteurs to effectively tell their stories to those who are both willing and unwilling to listen, and they often feature workshop members on The Moth website and podcast.

=== Education Program ===
The Education Program works with students, teachers, and professors from high-school through college to promote stronger community bonds within the student body and the administration. The overall mission is to prepare students for the world ahead of them by teaching crucial aspects of language and rhetoric, and to allow students and teachers to experience one another in a more intimate setting. In 2012 The Moth launched the High School Slam program, which brings StorySLAMs to public high schools in New York City. They currently hold SLAMs at twelve high schools in three boroughs, and an All-City SLAM that allows for inter-connectivity between students in all the boroughs.

=== Global Community Program ===
The Moth’s Global Community Program is an outreach initiative designed to curate and amplify first-person narratives from individuals across the Global South. By providing a platform for a diverse array of personal experiences, the program aims to broaden cultural perspectives and challenge prevailing social narratives.

=== MothWorks ===
MothWorks uses the essential elements of Moth storytelling at work and other unexpected places. Private workshops teach employees to use the power of storytelling to promote their business goals and ideas, while custom events to highlight the voices and mission of an organization in a unique setting.

== Broadcasting ==
In August 2009, the organization launched a national public radio show, The Moth Radio Hour, produced by Jay Allison and distributed by Public Radio Exchange. In 2010 The Moth Radio Hour won a Peabody Award. Now airing on 572 public radio stations,The Moth Radio Hour, garners more than 1,000,000 listeners each week.

The Moth offers a weekly podcast, which provides free audio of curated stories from live Moth events. The podcast is downloaded over 100 million times each year.

In February of 2023, The Moth expanded its offering to include Grown, a podcast focusing on stories that cover storytellers' experiences from the teenage years to young adulthood. Grown is hosted by Aleeza Kazmi and Fonzo Lacayo.

== Publishing ==
The Moth: 50 True Stories
- Editor: Catherine Burns
- Author: Various
- Language: English
- Genre: Storytelling
- Publisher: 2013 (Hyperion Books)
- Publication place: United States
- Media type: Print (paperback)
- Pages: 432
- ISBN: 978-1401311117

On September 3, 2013 Hyperion Books published The Moth: 50 True Stories, a collection of stories from the group's performance history. In December 2013 it reached #22 on The New York Times Paperback Nonfiction Best-Seller List. A second book, All These Wonders: True Stories about Facing the Unknown, was released by Crown in March 2017. Michiko Kakutani of The New York Times called it "wonderful". A third book, Occasional Magic: True Stories about Defying the Impossible, was released by Crown in March 2019, and was praised by Kirkus Reviews for its "captivating, artfully wrought tales." In 2022, The Moth released its fourth book, How to Tell a Story: The Essential Guide to Memorable Storytelling from The Moth, which debuted at #6 on The New York Times Advice, How-To & Miscellaneous Best-Sellers list, No. 6 on IndieBound's Hardcover Nonfiction Best Sellers list and # 12 on Publishers Weekly Best Sellers List. In September 2022, The Moth published an interactive card deck called A Game of Storytelling, which debuted at #1 on Amazon's top selling card game list.

== Moth Ball and Moth Award ==
The organization's annual fundraising event is called the Moth Ball. William McGowan of The Wall Street Journal called the ball the "hottest and hippest literary ticket" in 1999, and more recently Jen Carlson of Gothamist called it "NYC's Best Gala". At this event they present the Moth Award, celebrating the art of the raconteur. Past awards have gone to Hasan Minhaj, David Byrne, Regina King, Kemp Powers, Padma Lakshmi, Roxane Gay, Roz Chast, Zadie Smith, Carrie Brownstein, Garrison Keillor, Salman Rushdie, Anna Deavere Smith, Calvin Trillin, Spalding Gray (posthumously), Martin Scorsese, Albert Maysles and more.

== Controversies ==
Media critic Jack Shafer criticized best-selling Canadian author Malcolm Gladwell for telling a fictionalized story about his work at The Washington Post that was picked up by the Moth public radio show. Gladwell responded by pointing out that the Moth includes both true stories and the occasional tall tale. He said his piece clearly fell into the latter category.

== Storytellers ==
As of 2018, over 50,000 stories have been told at The Moth. Storytellers include:

- Jonathan Ames, author
- Maurice Ashley, chess grandmaster
- Wesley Autrey, recipient of the Bronze Medallion for bravery by the City of New York
- Elna Baker, ex-Mormon author
- Mike Birbiglia, comedian
- Andy Borowitz, humorist
- Gary Bremen, National Park Ranger
- David Chang, chef
- Margaret Cho, comedian
- Daniel Choi, activist
- Kimya Dawson, musician
- Thomas Dolby, musician
- Rachel Dratch, comedian
- Ophira Eisenberg, comedian and public radio host
- Ed Gavagan, furniture designer
- Malcolm Gladwell, author and journalist
- Jose B. Gonzalez, Connecticut Poet Laureate
- Adam Gopnik, author
- Ethan Hawke, actor, writer and director
- Christopher Hitchens, author, essayist, journalist, columnist
- Lisa P. Jackson, former EPA Administrator
- Ava Kay Jones, Voodoo priestess
- Garrison Keillor, public radio host
- Padma Lakshmi, television host
- Faye Lane, storyteller and solo performer
- Janna Levin, astrophysicist
- Joe Lockhart, former White House Press Secretary
- Dr. George Lombardi, infectious disease specialist
- Michael Massimino, astronaut
- Darryl "DMC" McDaniels, musician
- Moby, musician
- Edgar Oliver, author and playwright
- Steve Osborne, NYPD detective
- George Plimpton, author
- Sherman "O.T." Powell, former pickpocket
- Annie Proulx, author and journalist
- Cynthia Riggs, author and grandmother
- Molly Ringwald, actress and author
- Daisy Rosario, comedian, journalist, and producer
- Salman Rushdie, author
- Dan Savage, author
- Al Sharpton, activist
- Satori Shakoor, comedian, sketch actress, singer, writer
- Lili Taylor, actress
- Suzanne Vega, musician
- Magda Szubanski, comedian

== See also ==
- PechaKucha
