= Hoyt Richards =

American model and actor (born 1962)

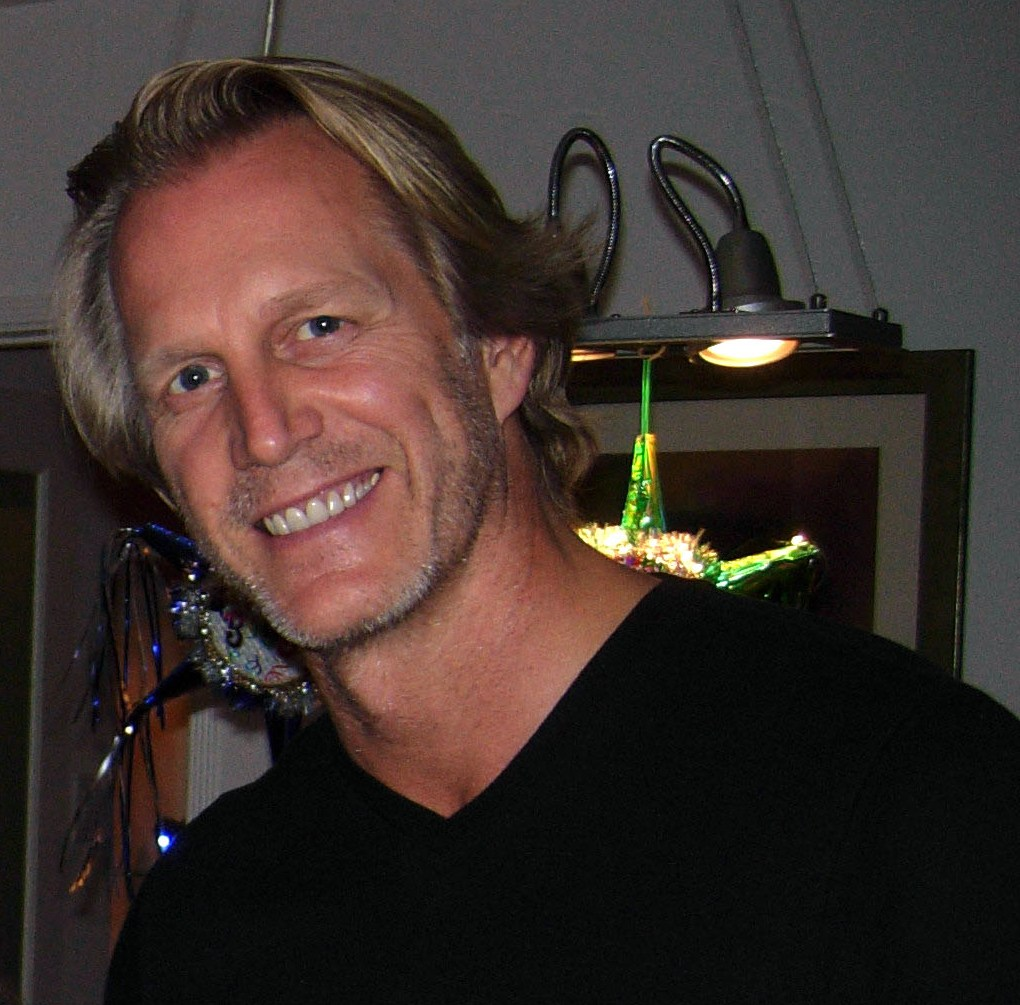
- Richards in January 2009
- Born: John Richards Hoyt; April 10, 1962 (age 64); Syracuse, New York, U.S.
- Occupations: Model, actor

Hoyt Richards (born John Richard Hoyt, April 10, 1962) is an American model and actor. Dubbed the “first male supermodel”, he attained international fame in the late 1980s working alongside contemporaries such as Cindy Crawford and Fabio Lanzoni.

== Career ==
Richards became one of the biggest names in modeling in the late 1980s and 1990s. He appeared in hundreds of advertising campaigns and was photographed by Bruce Weber, Richard Avedon, Helmut Newton, Steven Meisel, Horst, and Albert Watson. His campaigns include Gianni Versace, Valentino, Gianfranco Ferré, Ralph Lauren, Burberry, Dunhill, Cartier, and Donna Karan.

In his last year of high school, Richards landed a scholarship which sent him to England to be educated in the sixth form of the English public school Haileybury. After Haileybury, Richards, a scholar-athlete, went to Princeton University from where he graduated in 1985 with a BA in economics and played varsity football. At that stage, he had no plans to be a model. His focus was on football and school. But a shoulder injury led him to New York to see a specialist. On that trip, he was told his football playing days were over but he was spotted by a casting director. Eventually, his trips to New York for auditions led to a meeting with the Ford Model Agency. Thus began his career as a male model. This career spanned over fifteen years and encompassed over 200 major ads and hundreds of commercials.

In the late 1990s, Richards moved from New York to Los Angeles to begin pursuing a career as an actor. He first appeared in the Harrison Ford/Anne Heche romantic comedy, Six Days, Seven Nights. Since then, he has appeared in over fifteen independent films including such projects as the comedy, Hit and Runway (1999) and the dramas, Taxi Dance (2009) and The Disciple (2010). In 2005, Richards, also a screenwriter, began his own production company, Tortoise Entertainment, that develops and produces television, documentary and film projects. In 2014, Tortoise produced a buddy comedy called Dumbbells that Hoyt wrote and starred in.

== Marriage ==
Hoyt was married in 2026 to Donna Flagg, a woman he had left because of Eternal Values.

== Filmography ==
- 2014: Dumbbells - Writer, Producer
- 2012: Continuity
- 2010: The Disciple
- 2010: Paradise Lost
- 2010: Action News 5
- 2010: The Gertrude Stein Mystery or Some Like it Art
- 2011: Showgirls 2: Penny's from Heaven
- 2009: American High School
- 2009: Taxi Dance
- 2008: Dog Tags
- 2006: Futbaal: The Price of Dreams
- 2006: Transgressions
- 2004: High Art, Low Life
- 2003: Get Money
- 1999: Hit and Runway
- 1999: The Annihilation of Fish
- 1998: Distress Signals
- 1998: Six Days, Seven Nights

== Involvement in a cult ==
In March 1990, investigative journalist Marie Brenner wrote an article in Vanity Fair which examined The Eternal Values Cult led by New York socialite Frederick von Mierers. Through this article it was made public that Richards was involved with the group. The article revealed how von Mierers was taking advantage of young people into surrendering their money and cutting off their families in the pursuit of a seemingly spiritual life.

In April 2018, the BBC World Service Outlook programme broadcast an interview with Hoyt Richards. Outside working hours, he was involved with a cult called Eternal Values. They believed there would be a catastrophe at the turn of the century and the group would have a crucial role to play. He describes in the programme how he came to realise that it was a cult that he had joined, its malevolent influence on him, how he struggled to free himself of it, and then came to terms with what had happened to him.

In June 2026, a three-part HBO series revolving around Richards' involvement, Bring Me the Beauties: A Model Cult directed by Chris Smith, was released. The documentary dives deeper into how Richards came to be involved with von Mierers and the cult and his eventual escape in 1999. Since leaving the cult, Hoyt has been a speaker and advocate and uses his website and various speaking appearances to try prevent others from falling into the same trap as he did.
