= Mathias Lauridsen =

Danish male model

- Born: January 13, 1984 (age 42); Denmark
- Occupation: Model
- Years active: 2003–present
- Modeling information
- Height: 1.89 m (6 ft 2 in)
- Hair color: Dark blonde
- Eye color: Blue/Green
- Agency: IMG Models (New York, Sydney); Premium Models (Paris); Sight Management Studio (Barcelona); Scoop Models (Barcelona); Kult Model Agency (Hamburg)

Mathias Lauridsen (born January 13, 1984) is a Danish model. He broke onto the international fashion scene debuting at Marc by Marc Jacobs in New York and Miu Miu in Paris, for the Spring 2004 collections. His consistent work for major international fashion brands and publications has solidified his status as a supermodel. In 2014, Vogue listed him as one of the top 10 male models of all time.

== Modelling career ==
Lauridsen was discovered in 2003 and is currently signed with Ford Models in Paris, IMG in New York and Scoop in Copenhagen. He is considered to be one of the best male models, and has landed many lucrative contracts, for example the Gucci Pour Homme II fragrance. His runway credentials include opening shows for Hermès, Belstaff, Jill Stuart and closing for Missoni, Gucci, Valentino and John Galliano.

Lauridsen has been featured in numerous major fashion campaigns including Prada, Jil Sander, Gucci, Hugo Boss, Givenchy, Louis Vuitton, Christian Dior, Kenzo, Hermès, Fendi, Calvin Klein, Marc Jacobs, DKNY, Tommy Hilfiger, Lacoste, Aldo, Bottega Veneta, Carolina Herrera, Emporio Armani, Coach, Cartier, Burberry, H&M, Salvatore Ferragamo, Diesel, Nina Ricci, Missoni, Massimo Dutti and Filippa K.

He has appeared in dozens of editorials for major fashion publications such as Vogue Italia, L'Uomo Vogue, Vogue Paris, Numéro Homme, numerous international editions of GQ and Details.

Some of the photographers he has worked with include Mario Testino, Steven Meisel, Karl Lagerfeld, David Sims, Patrick Demarchelier, Craig McDean and Richard Avedon. Avedon photographed Lauridsen for a Hermès campaign in 2004 that proved to be one of the photographers last works.

He was ranked number 1 on models.com Top 50 Male Models list for more than two years. Lauridsen was the youngest model to appear on the list. He is also ranked #2 in the list of the most successful male models in the world, published by Forbes. As of July 2014, he's ranked in the Top Icons Men and The Money Guys on Models.com.

His distinguishing feature is a scar he has on his left cheek.

== Agencies ==
- IMG Models – New York City
- Premium Models – Paris
- Kult Model Agency – Hamburg
- Scoop Models – Copenhagen
- Avenue Modeller – Gothenburg
- Sight Management Studio – Barcelona
- Mother agency: Scoop Models Copenhagen
