= Over the Edge (1999) =

World Wrestling Federation pay-per-view event

- Promotional poster featuring The Undertaker
- Promotion: World Wrestling Federation
- Date: May 23, 1999
- City: Kansas City, Missouri, US
- Venue: Kemper Arena
- Attendance: 16,472
- Buy rate: 430,000
- Tagline: Evil is once perceived as what man did not understand, but now man understands it very well

Pay-per-view chronology
← Previous; No Mercy	Next → King of the Ring

Over the Edge chronology
← Previous; In Your House	Next → Final

The 1999 Over the Edge was a professional wrestling pay-per-view (PPV) event produced by the World Wrestling Federation (WWF, renamed WWE in 2002). It was the second annual and final Over the Edge and took place on May 23, 1999, at Kemper Arena in Kansas City, Missouri, United States. The first Over the Edge in May 1998 was an In Your House event, but following the discontinuation of the In Your House series after February 1999, a second Over the Edge was scheduled as its own PPV event, thus being the first former In Your House event to do so.

In the main event, The Undertaker defeated "Stone Cold" Steve Austin to win the WWF Championship with Vince McMahon and Shane McMahon as the special guest referees. Of the six scheduled bouts on the undercard, two received more promotion than the other matches. The first saw The Rock defeat Triple H by disqualification. The other was an eight-man elimination tag team match in which The Union (Mankind, Ken Shamrock, Test, and Big Show) defeated the Corporate Ministry (Viscera, Big Boss Man, Bradshaw, and Faarooq)

The event is infamous for the fatal stunt accident involving wrestler Owen Hart, who was scheduled to face The Godfather for the WWF Intercontinental Championship. Wrestling under his Blue Blazer gimmick, Hart was to make a superhero-like ring entrance, which would have seen him descend from the arena rafters into the ring. He was, however, released prematurely when the harness line malfunctioned, fell more than 90 feet (27 m) into the ring, and died.

Criticism later arose over Vince McMahon's decision to continue the show after the accident. In court, Hart's widow Martha, children, and parents sued the WWF, contending that poor planning of the dangerous stunt caused Hart's death. The WWF settled the case out of court, with the McMahon family paying US$18 million (equivalent to $34 million in 2025) to Hart's surviving family. Due to the accident and controversy surrounding the event, the Over the Edge name was retired and its PPV slot was replaced by Judgment Day in 2000. The event was also not released for home video viewing until the launch of the WWE Network in 2014, where an edited version of the show displays a tribute to Hart at the beginning but otherwise removes any mention of his involvement.

== Production ==
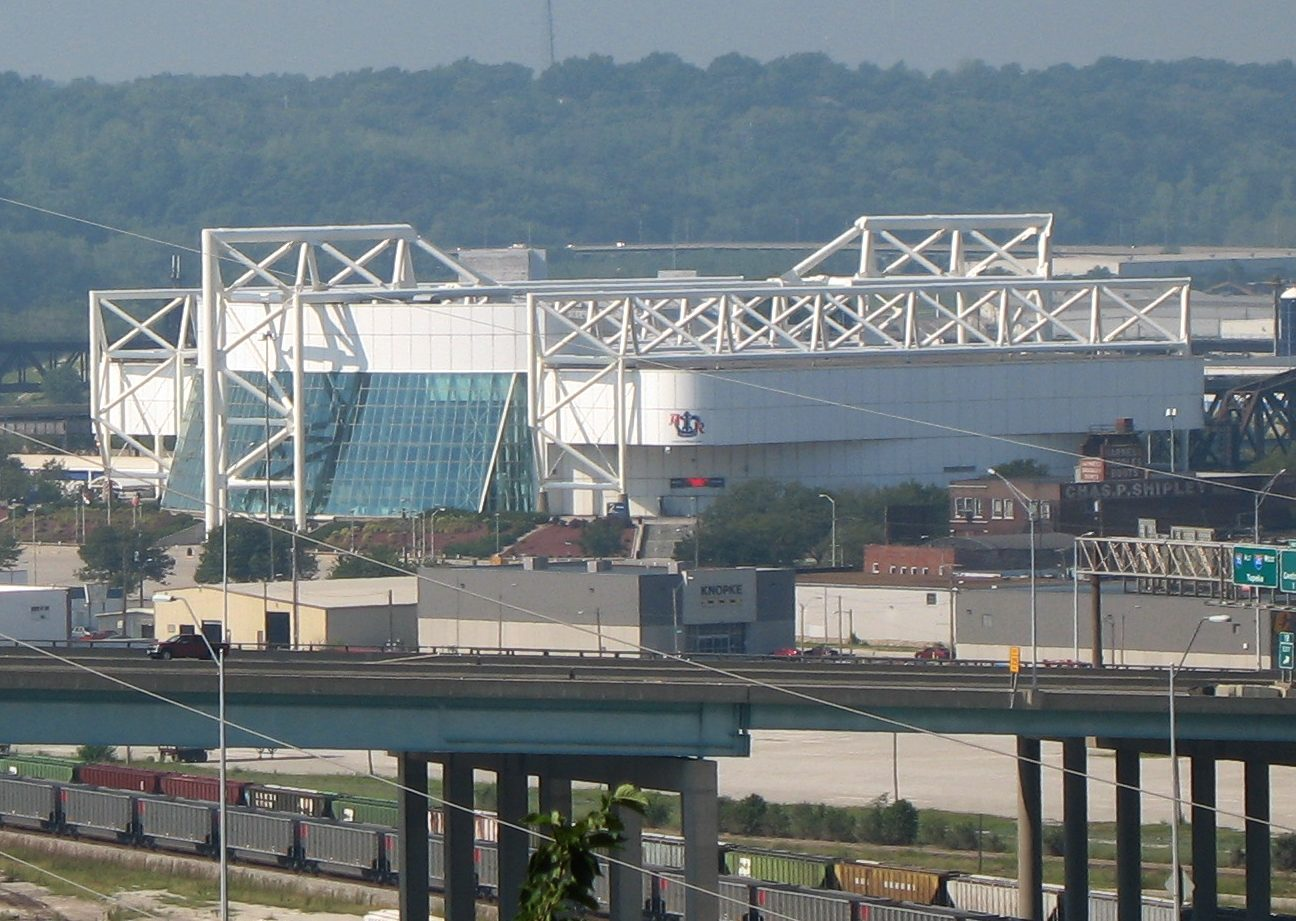
The second annual and final Over the Edge was held at Kemper Arena in Kansas City, Missouri.

=== Background ===
From May 1995 to February 1999, the professional wrestling company World Wrestling Federation (WWF, renamed WWE in 2002) ran a series of pay-per-view (PPV) events titled In Your House. They aired when the promotion was not holding one of its then-five major PPVs (WrestleMania, King of the Ring, SummerSlam, Survivor Series, and Royal Rumble) and were sold at a lower cost. Following St. Valentine's Day Massacre: In Your House in February 1999, the In Your House branding was retired to give each monthly PPV a permanent identity.

Prior to the discontinuation of the In Your House series, the WWF held Over the Edge: In Your House in May 1998, which was the 22nd In Your House event. A second Over the Edge was scheduled for May 23, 1999, at the Kemper Arena in Kansas City, Missouri, promoting it as a standalone event, originally establishing Over the Edge to be the annual May PPV event. It was the first former In Your House event to continue as its own distinct PPV.

=== Storylines ===
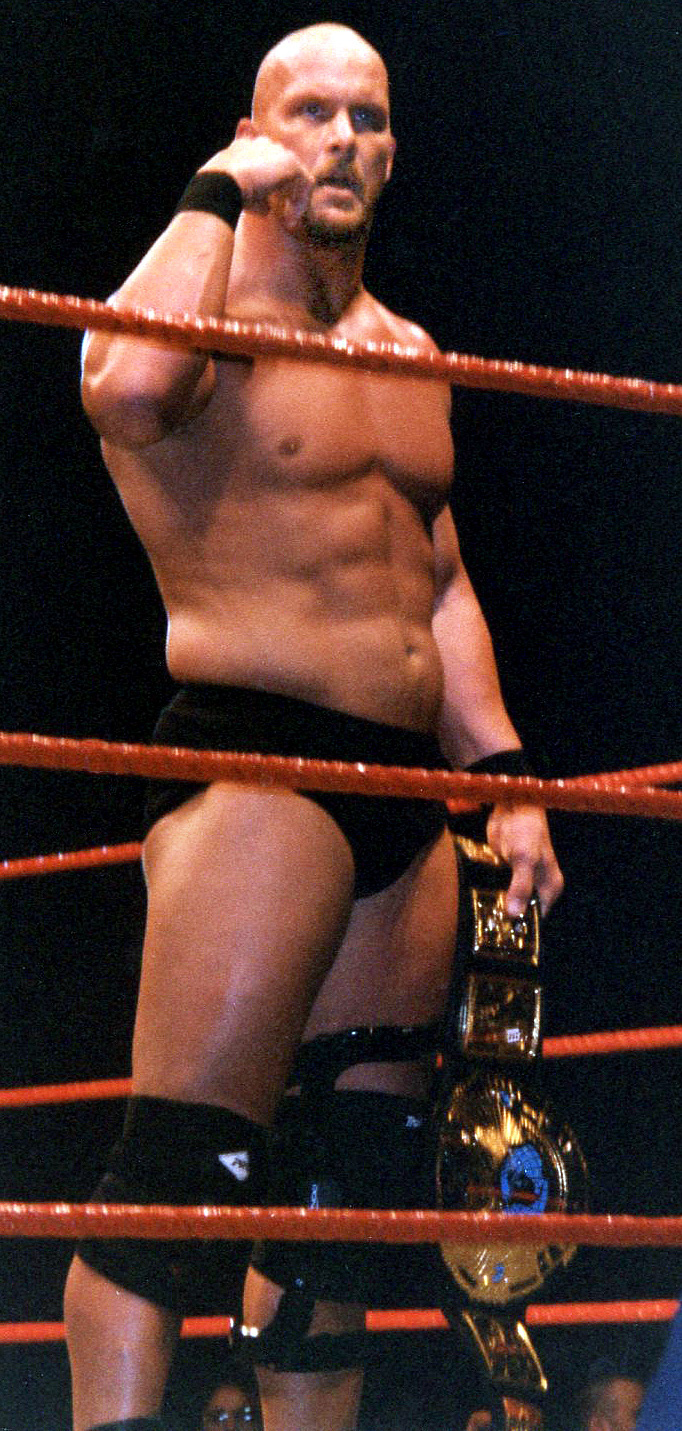
"Stone Cold" Steve Austin as WWF Champion

The matches at Over the Edge were based on scripted storylines, which were developed on the WWF's weekly television programs.

The main rivalry centered on WWF Champion "Stone Cold" Steve Austin and The Undertaker. At Backlash 1999, The Undertaker abducted Stephanie McMahon, daughter of WWF chairman Vince McMahon, and demanded control of the WWF as ransom. Austin intervened to rescue Stephanie, intensifying his conflict with The Undertaker. As a result, the two were scheduled to face each other for the WWF Championship at Over the Edge, with Shane McMahon, who had allied with The Undertaker, initially appointing himself as the special guest referee. WWF Commissioner Shawn Michaels later ruled that Vince McMahon would serve as co-referee to ensure impartial officiating.

The rivalry escalated during the weeks leading up to the event. On the May 3 episode of Raw is War, The Undertaker attacked Austin by throwing him off the entrance stage. Two weeks later, Austin retaliated by handcuffing The Undertaker to a large symbol resembling a crucifix and raising it above the ring during a live broadcast.

A secondary storyline involved The Rock and Triple H. Tensions flared when Triple H cost The Rock a match by interference, and later attacked him by throwing him off the stage, resulting in a (kayfabe) arm injury that required The Rock to wear a plaster cast. Acting as an authority figure, Shane McMahon ruled that The Rock would not be allowed to wear the cast during their scheduled match at Over the Edge.

The event also featured an ongoing faction feud between the Corporate Ministry and the Union. The Corporate Ministry had formed by merging two previous stables: The Corporation and The Undertaker’s Ministry of Darkness. The two groups clashed throughout May 1999, including a mass brawl during the May 10 episode of Raw is War. Their rivalry led to an eight-man elimination tag team match scheduled for Over the Edge.

== Event ==
Other on-screen personnel
Role:	Name:
English commentators	Jim Ross
English commentators	Jerry Lawler
Spanish commentators	Carlos Cabrera
Spanish commentators	Hugo Savinovich
Interviewer	Kevin Kelly
Interviewer	Michael Cole
Ring announcer	Howard Finkel
Referees	Mike Chioda
Referees	Earl Hebner
Referees	Theodore Long
Referees	Tim White
Referees	Jimmy Korderas

Jim Ross and Jerry "The King" Lawler provided English-language commentary for the event, while Carlos Cabrera and Hugo Savinovich served as the Spanish-language commentators. Howard Finkel acted as the event's ring announcer. Refereeing duties were carried out by Mike Chioda, Earl Hebner, Theodore Long, Tim White, and Jimmy Korderas, with additional officiating by Vince McMahon, Pat Patterson, and Gerald Brisco in special circumstances.

=== Pre-show ===
Before the start of the live pay-per-view broadcast, a special episode of Sunday Night Heat aired on the USA Network to build anticipation for the main card. In the opening match, Meat defeated Brian Christopher. This was followed by a tag team bout in which the Hardy Boyz (Matt and Jeff Hardy) defeated the team of Goldust and The Blue Meanie. After the match, The Brood, comprising Edge, Christian, and Gangrel, ambushed the Hardy Boyz and their manager, Michael Hayes, performing a bloodbath ritual by dousing them in fake blood. In the final pre-show segment, Vince McMahon faced Mideon in a match that ended in a no-contest after members of the Corporate Ministry attacked McMahon and (kayfabe) injured his ankle. This storyline development served to cast doubt on McMahon’s ability to serve as referee later in the night.

=== Preliminary matches ===
After Sunday Night Heat, the PPV event began with a tag team match, in which Kane and X-Pac, the WWF Tag Team Champions, defended against Mark Henry and D'Lo Brown. During the match, Henry lifted X-Pac and rammed his back against the steel ring post at ringside. Afterward, Brown and Henry simultaneously attacked X-Pac, which led Kane to launch himself from the top turnbuckle onto Brown and Henry. After the competitors reentered the ring, Kane performed a chokeslam on Henry, lifting him by the throat and slamming him down. Kane then pinned Henry to retain the WWF Tag Team Championship. Next was the hardcore match, which allowed no disqualifications or countouts. Al Snow, the WWF Hardcore Champion, defended against Hardcore Holly. Holly and Snow began their match in the ring but moved their brawl into the arena stands. From there, they proceeded to the backstage area, and into the concession stands before returning to the ring. The fight was decided when Snow lifted Holly onto his shoulders and threw him through a wooden table. Successfully covering and pinning Holly, Snow retained the WWF Hardcore Championship.

The next scheduled match was a singles match for the WWF Intercontinental Championship between The Godfather (champion) and the Blue Blazer (Owen Hart). As Hart descended into the ring on a safety harness, the equipment gave way, and he fell. Emergency medical technicians (EMTs) rushed him to the hospital, but he was pronounced dead on arrival. The show was halted for 15 minutes before it continued with the next match, a mixed tag team match pitting Val Venis and Nicole Bass against Jeff Jarrett and Debra. At one point, Jarrett attempted to hit Bass with a guitar, but Venis took the guitar away, dropped Jarrett on the mat and pinned him. In the fourth match of the evening, Billy Gunn defeated his former tag team partner Road Dogg, after hitting him with the time keeper's hammer.

=== Main event matches ===
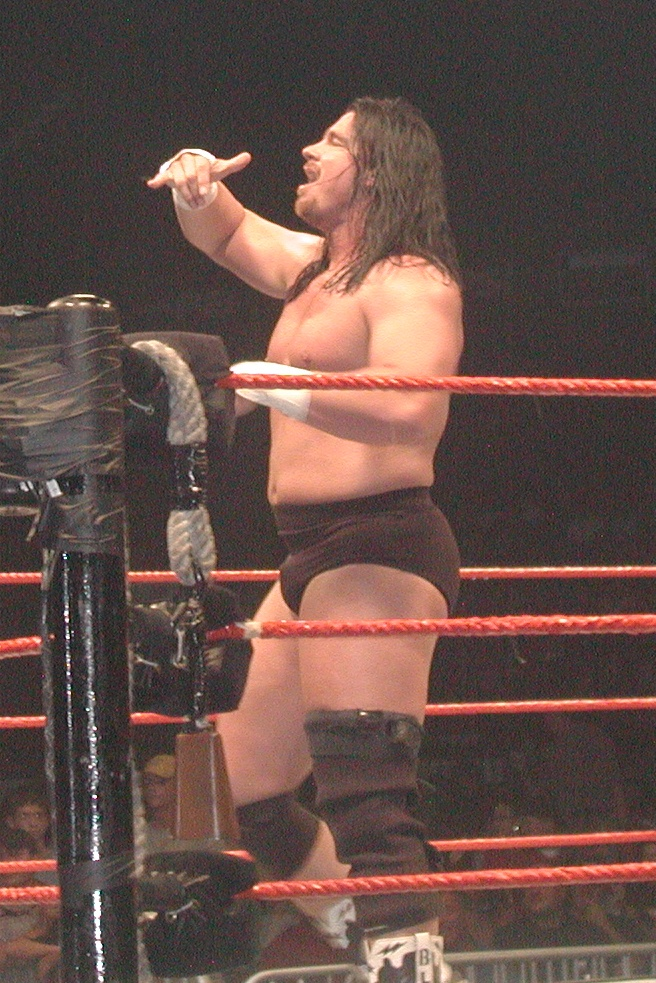
Bradshaw, a member of the Corporate Ministry

The fifth match was the eight-man elimination tag-team match between The Union (Big Show, Ken Shamrock, Mankind, and Test) and the Corporate Ministry (Big Boss Man, Bradshaw, Faarooq, and Viscera). Test was eliminated by pinfall after Bradshaw performed a "Clothesline from Hell" on him. Bradshaw was then eliminated by submission as a result of Ken Shamrock's ankle lock. Afterwards, Shamrock was eliminated via disqualification as a result of attacking the referee. Then, Faarooq was eliminated by pinfall after the Big Show chokeslammed him. Only one member of each team remained after Viscera and the Big Show failed to return to the ring within ten seconds and were counted out as a result. The Union won the match after Mankind forced Boss Man to submit with the Mandible claw. It was at this point that the viewers at home were told by Jim Ross that Owen Hart had died.

The final match on the undercard pitted Triple H against The Rock. Triple H targeted The Rock's injured arm. Towards the end of the match, Triple H asked Chyna, his valet, to retrieve a folding chair. The referee, however, took it away from him, which led to an argument between Triple H and the referee; Triple H pushed down the referee, for which he was disqualified, giving The Rock the victory. After the match, Mankind ran in to save The Rock from Triple H and Chyna.

In the main event, "Stone Cold" Steve Austin defended his WWF Championship against The Undertaker. Originally, Shane and Vince McMahon were supposed to be the guest referees, Vince McMahon had his ankle (kayfabe) broken earlier in the event and was replaced by his accomplice Pat Patterson, to prevent Shane from helping The Undertaker. Patterson, however, could not continue after the Undertaker chokeslammed him. The Undertaker and Austin wrestled inconclusively until Austin hit The Undertaker on the head with a folding chair. As Austin went to cover the Undertaker, Gerald Brisco, another accomplice of Vince, came down to the ring to replace Patterson and counted the unsuccessful pinfall attempt by Austin. Like his partner Patterson, Brisco was attacked by the Undertaker. Vince then came down to the ring to act as referee, but when Austin forcefully executed a stunner on the Undertaker, Shane prevented Vince from performing a three count. As Vince, Shane and Austin, argued, Shane shoved Vince into Austin, who fell into a roll-up by The Undertaker. Shane performed a fast count to give the Undertaker the victory and the WWF Championship.

== Owen Hart accident ==
This is not part of the entertainment tonight. This is as real as real can be here.

— Jim Ross, play-by-play commentator for the event

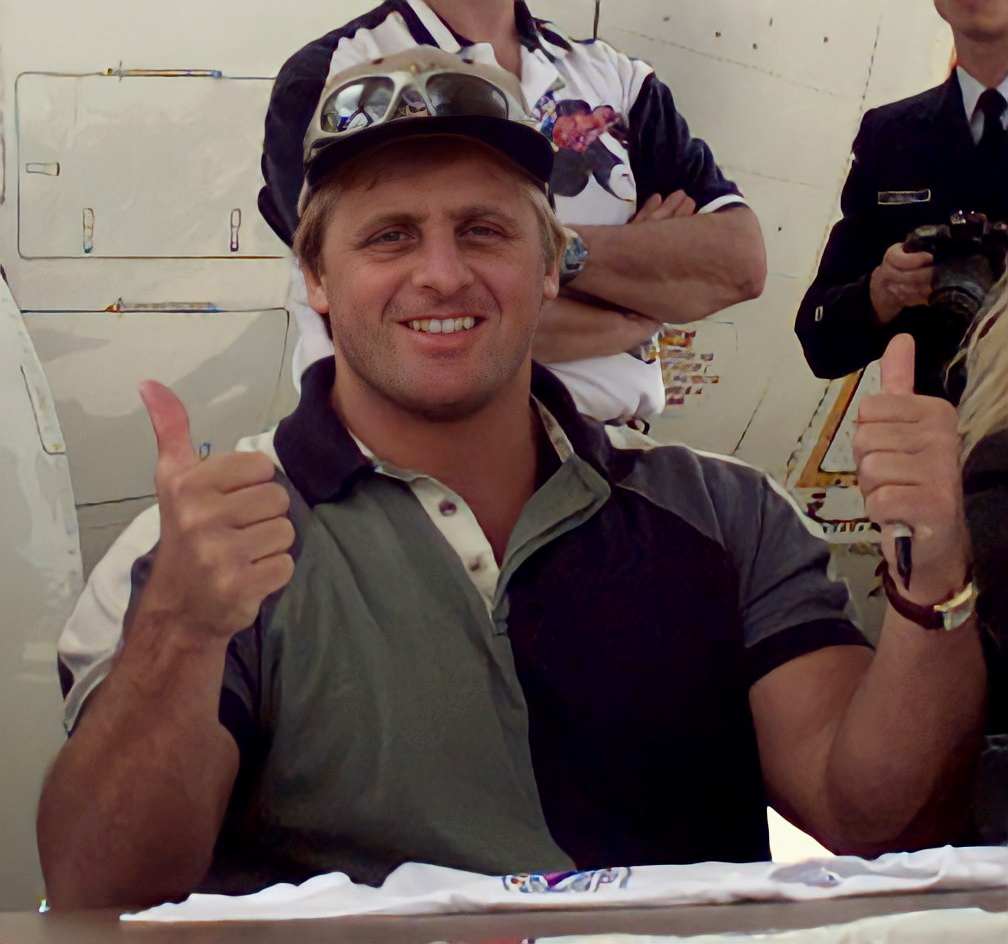
Owen Hart (pictured a week before the event) fell to his death before his Intercontinental Championship match against The Godfather

When Owen Hart was to challenge The Godfather for the WWF Intercontinental Championship, he was performing as the Blue Blazer. The character, originally used by Hart in the late 1980s, had recently been revived as a superhero gimmick that parodied various wrestlers. At Over the Edge, Hart was to emulate WCW wrestler Sting's ring entrance by descending from the arena rafters in a suspended harness, stopping a few feet above the floor, at which point the suspension mechanism would "malfunction" and drop him unceremoniously onto the ring. The entrance was successfully tested on the November 15, 1998 episode of Sunday Night Heat (that year's Survivor Series pre-show) using a different harness configuration; however, during his descent at Over the Edge, a cable disengaged from the safety vest he wore, and he fell approximately 90 feet (27 m) from the rafters into the ring. As he fell, he landed chest-first on the top rope.

The accident was not seen by television viewers. A pre-recorded promo and interview video was shown at the start of Hart's descent, and when the broadcast returned live, the cameras quickly turned away from the ring to the audience. Soon afterward, Jim Ross, one of the commentators of the event, informed pay-per-view viewers that Hart had fallen from the rafters, that the incident was "not a part of the entertainment" and that it was "a real situation". Ross's broadcast partner Jerry Lawler immediately ran to the ring to check on Hart and was visibly shaken when he returned to the announcer table on air, saying "it doesn't look good at all." At the same time, Spanish-language commentator Carlos Cabrera was interpreting the Blue Blazer promo, but began shouting "Oh, no!" repeatedly upon Hart's fall, and remained silent for the rest of the promo and the interview. As the camera focused on Jim Ross, Cabrera's partner, Hugo Savinovich, prayed, "I only beg Father God that nothing tragic occurs here." EMTs came down to the ring and gave Hart CPR, but he showed no response to the treatment. Bringing Hart out on a gurney, the EMTs boarded the injured wrestler into an ambulance and took him to nearby Truman Medical Center in Kansas City.

At 7:59 p.m. Central Standard Time, Hart arrived at Truman Medical Center. His Glasgow Coma Scale, a system used to measure neurological function, was listed at a 3/15. Three is the lowest possible score, meaning eye, verbal and motor function each received a score of one. A GCS of three refers to imminent death or that death has already occurred. The initial reading from the cardiac monitor indicated he was in asystole, meaning that he had no detectable heart activity at all. However, seconds later, there were signs of pulseless electrical activity, meaning his heart was not beating but faint electrical activity was still detectable. At this point, nurses began calling out observations on the apparent lifeless body of Hart to doctor Michael Tucker. Hart's skin had turned blue, his lips were colorless and his skin was cold; nurses also reported he had no bowel sounds and his abdomen was soft. Nurses also noted that he had also suffered an apparent open fracture above his left elbow and a cut below, but these wounds were of little concern to the medical staff at the moment. Nonetheless, the medical staff still persisted and pumped Hart's unresponsive body with epinephrine in an attempt to stimulate his heart. Still, no pulse was detected, even though his heart still showed signs of slight electrical activity. Outside in the waiting room, former wrestler Harley Race awaited word on Hart. He was joined by Jeff Jarrett, who had participated at the event, in the match immediately after the fall. As the night progressed, a variety of concerned wrestlers who numbered close to two dozen had arrived to get information on Hart's condition. At 8:07 a final dose of epinephrine and atropine went into Hart's right femoral line. After four minutes, he was still unresponsive. CPR was performed in the final few minutes of his life but the doctors determined that all resuscitation efforts were futile. Thirteen minutes after arriving at the medical center, 33 minutes after the fall, all work on Hart was stopped. At 8:12 p.m., Hart was pronounced dead at the age of 34.

After the incident, the event was halted for 15 minutes, until Vince McMahon and other WWF corporate officials decided to continue the event. Hart's coworkers, professional wrestlers, and other miscellaneous workers appeared somber after Hart's fall as they continued to perform. An hour after the event restarted, Ross informed viewers that Hart had died. The fans in attendance were not told any information about what had happened to Hart, and they did not hear the announcement of his death.

Here at Kansas City, tragedy befell the World Wrestling Federation and all of us. Owen Hart was set to make an entrance from the ceiling, and he fell from the ceiling. And I have the unfortunate responsibility to let everyone know that Owen Hart has died. Owen Hart has tragically died from that accident here tonight.

— Jim Ross, play-by-play commentator for the event, informing viewers of Owen Hart's death.

=== Aftermath ===
After the event, in response to Owen Hart's death, the WWF canceled the encore presentation of Over the Edge via pay-per-view, and they also canceled four live events in Canada and one in Illinois. The 1999 Over the Edge event was never officially released on VHS or DVD due to Hart's death. The event was in turn discontinued and its PPV slot was replaced by Judgment Day in 2000. In 2014, the event was shown in an edited form on WWE's online streaming service, the WWE Network. All mentions of the Blue Blazer character were also removed from the Sunday Night Heat pre-show when the episodes of the show were added to the WWE Network in 2018, while the Blue Blazer gimmick was also removed from the video game WWF Attitude, which also features a tribute to him on the game's startup. On May 24, 1999, the day following this event, tributes to Hart were held on Raw is War (which was held in St. Louis) and on WCW Monday Nitro (which was held in Greenville, South Carolina); the WWF tribute was called Raw is Owen. For the WWF tribute show, all storylines and rivalries were stopped, and wrestlers were given the option to wrestle or not. The show also included interviews and testimonies from his coworkers and highlights of his professional wrestling career.

Owen Hart's funeral service was held on May 31, 1999, in Calgary, Canada, and it was attended by family members, friends, and over 300 wrestlers who were acquainted with him. Following the funeral, Hart was buried in Calgary's Queens Park Cemetery later that day. Three weeks after the event, his widow, children, and parents sued the WWF for causing Owen's death with a poorly planned stunt; they claimed that the harness system was defective. After the court case had extended one-and-a-half years, a settlement was reached on November 2, 2000, when the WWF agreed to pay his widow, children, and parents US$18 million. The manufacturer of the harness system had also been named as a defendant in the case but was dismissed from the case after the settlement was reached.

After Over the Edge, The Rock began a feud with The Undertaker over the WWF Championship, culminating in a match at King of the Ring, after The Rock defeated The Undertaker and Triple H in a Triple Threat Match, to earn a WWF Championship match against The Undertaker. At King of the Ring, The Undertaker defeated The Rock to retain his title. "Stone Cold" Steve Austin engaged in a rivalry with Vince and Shane McMahon in retaliation for their interference during his match at Over the Edge. Austin lost the match at King of the Ring, and his (kayfabe) 50% control in the WWF, but before that he scheduled himself in a title match against The Undertaker on June 28. Austin won the match and the title. Eventually, a feud developed between Austin, Mankind, and Triple H over the WWF Championship, which led to a match at SummerSlam. There, Mankind won the WWF Championship.

== Reactions ==
Vince McMahon and the WWF received strong criticism for designing the stunt and allowing the event to continue after Owen Hart's fall. In his weekly column for the Calgary Sun—a major newspaper in Hart's hometown—on May 31, 1999, Bret Hart (who at the time had a very acrimonious relationship with the company due to the Montreal Screwjob a year and a half prior) blamed Vince McMahon for his brother's death. He "question[ed] if this was really necessary" and said, "Shame on you, Vince McMahon." He also claimed that the tribute show "reeked of disrespect," stating, "Yes, the so-called tribute where afterward wrestlers point to their crotches and say: 'Suck it!' It makes me nauseous." Bret Hart later stated that he wished he would have been in the WWF at the time, so he could have talked his brother out of doing the stunt.

Other members of the Hart family also blamed Vince McMahon for Owen's death, claiming that the accident was the inevitable outcome of "an obsession for ratings and revenues." While in Calgary for Owen's funeral, wrestler Hulk Hogan stated, "Hopefully something good will happen. Wrestling's gotten … way too over the top". In reference to McMahon, he added, "I hope he learns a lesson from this horrible accident". Ralph Klein, the Premier of Alberta at the time, expressed a hope that Hart's death would lead to changes in wrestling, stating, "Maybe the various federations will rethink the gimmickry."

Calgary Sun columnist Eric Francis called McMahon's decision to continue the event "sick, disrespectful and wrong. But what else would you expect from the WWF?" He added, "if there's any justice in this world, McMahon will pay dearly for what his organization has done to further pain the Harts". Some fans were also upset with the decision to carry on with the show. One man, who left the event with his children upon hearing that Hart had died, claimed, "It was disgusting. … For kids to see that, for this to be so-called family entertainment, for them to just carry on as if nothing had happened, is just sad." Martha Hart, Owen's wife, refused to criticize McMahon publicly in the immediate aftermath of her husband's death. She said that McMahon "absolutely should be there" at the funeral. She also stated, "I'm a very forgiving person and I'm not bitter or angry, but there will be a day of reckoning". Commenting on the WWF's decision to continue the show after her husband's death, Martha stated, "After he lost his fight for life they just scooped him up and ordered the next match out. Where's the humanity? Would he have wanted the show to go on? Absolutely not."

The WWF received some support from people who felt that the company did the right thing by continuing the event. Vince Russo, a WWF scriptwriter at the time, pointed to the fact that Brian Pillman, a family friend of the Harts and a member of The Hart Foundation, died shortly before the Badd Blood: In Your House pay-per-view on which he was scheduled to perform in 1997. After learning of Pillman's death, both Bret and Owen Hart went ahead with their matches on the show. Russo claimed that this showed that "the night he passed away I'm sure Owen would have wanted the same thing." Vince McMahon refused to comment on Hart's death until he felt sufficient time had passed. When asked if he felt responsible for the accident, he replied, "I have a lot to say and I will say it. I promise you that. But this is not the time to do it. … Give me a few days. Give me to the end of the week. Then we'll talk." The day after Over the Edge, the WWF published a message in the Calgary Sun, stating, "We do not have much information as to how it happened and will not know until an investigation is completed. We are all shaken, and to say Owen will be missed is to fall short of a way to fully explain what he meant to us." Although the WWF had no information, they reported that "Our thoughts and prayers go out to the entire Hart family. We have to be strong for Owen; he was an extraordinary human being and consummate performer and knows that the highest tribute that we can pay is to go on entertaining the fans he loved so much."

== Reception ==
In 2013, Dylan Diot of 411Mania gave the event a rating of 4.5 [Poor], stating, "It's hard to review this event considering the circumstances involving the death of Owen Hart. The matches on this show weren't that good and the show looked like it wasn't going to be that good even before the Owen incident occurred. However, I can't fault the performance of anyone that had to follow Owen's accident as it is completely understandable that the guys did not have their hearts in the matches following the incident."

The incident is covered in the tenth episode of the second season titled "The Final Days of Owen Hart" in the Canadian docuseries, Dark Side of the Ring.

== Results ==
No.	Results	Stipulations	Times
1^{H}	Meat (with Jacqueline, Ryan Shamrock, and Terri Runnels) defeated Brian Christopher (with Scott Taylor)	Singles match	2:04
2^{H}	The Hardy Boyz (Jeff Hardy and Matt Hardy) (with Michael Hayes) defeated The Blue Meanie and Goldust	Tag team match	5:53
3^{H}	Mideon (with Big Boss Man, Bradshaw, Faarooq, and Viscera) vs. Mr. McMahon (with Gerald Brisco and Pat Patterson) ended in a no contest	Singles match	2:51
4	Kane and X-Pac (c) defeated D'Lo Brown and Mark Henry (with Ivory)	Tag team match for the WWF Tag Team Championship	14:45
5	Al Snow (c) (with Head) defeated Hardcore Holly	Hardcore match for the WWF Hardcore Championship	12:53
6	Nicole Bass and Val Venis defeated Debra and Jeff Jarrett	Mixed tag team match	6:07
7	Billy Gunn defeated Road Dogg	Singles match	11:14
8	The Union (Big Show, Ken Shamrock, Mankind, and Test) defeated The Corporate Ministry (Big Boss Man, Bradshaw, Faarooq, and Viscera)	Eight-man tag team elimination match	14:59
9	The Rock defeated Triple H (with Chyna) by disqualification	Singles match	11:41
10	The Undertaker (with Paul Bearer) defeated "Stone Cold" Steve Austin (c)	Singles match for the WWF Championship; Shane McMahon and Vince McMahon were the special guest referees. Additionally, had Austin been disqualified, he would have lost the championship.	22:58
(c) / – the champion(s) heading into the match; H / – the match was broadcast prior to the pay-per-view on Sunday Night Heat

== See also ==
- List of premature professional wrestling deaths
