= Solectrac =

American electric tractor manufacturer

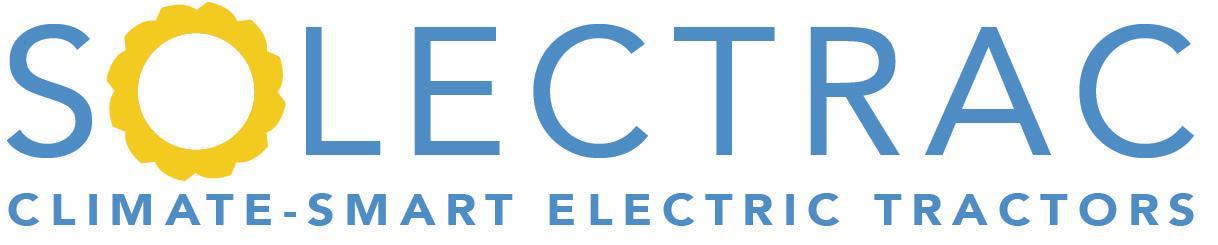
- Trade name: Solectrac, Inc.
- Industry: Agricultural
- Founded: 2012
- Founder: Stephen Heckeroth
- Headquarters: Santa Rosa, California
- Website: solectrac.com

Solectrac was an American tractor manufacturer based in Santa Rosa, California. It manufactured electric tractors for agricultural uses.

== History ==
Solectrac was established in 2012 by Stephen Heckeroth. On the first Earth Day in 1970, Steve began his journey toward addressing the negative effects of burning fossil fuels. Then in 1990, encouraged by the California Air Resources Board (CARB) Zero Emissions Mandate, he turned his attention to transportation. He then began designing and building various types of electric vehicles and in 1992 founded MendoMotive and Electrac.

In 1995, he was commissioned to build an experimental electric tractor for Ford and New Holland. The following year, Heckeroth was commissioned by a Japanese company (EFRIG) to build an electric tractor to be used in the critical processes of removing land mines left behind after wars.

In 2012 he founded Solectrac LLC to take small farm electric tractors into commercial production. In 2013 Solectrac received a $500,000 grant from the Indian US Science and Technology Fund (IUSSTF) to develop four all-electric tractor prototypes.

Ideanomics has a 100% stake in the company following an investment in 2020.

As of June 2024, Solectrac has been shut down internally and is no longer functioning leaving customers with no support for their machines.

Ideanomics filed for bankruptcy on December 4, 2024 in Delaware, with plans to sell all of its assets, including Solectrac.

== See also ==
- Monarch Tractor
