= Shane McMahon =

American professional wrestler and businessman (born 1970)

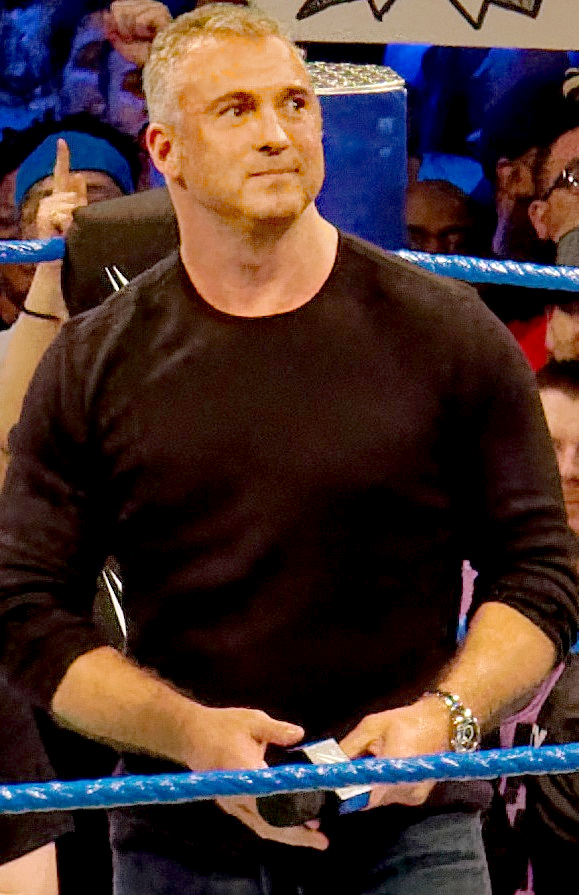
- McMahon in 2018
- Born: Shane Brandon McMahon; January 15, 1970 (age 56); Gaithersburg, Maryland, U.S.
- Education: Boston University
- Occupations: Professional wrestler; businessman
- Years active: 1990–present
- Title: Founder and former executive chairman of Ideanomics
- Spouse: Marissa Mazzola
- Children: 3
- Parent(s): Vince McMahon; Linda McMahon
- Family: McMahon
- Professional wrestling career
- Ring name(s): Shane McMahon; Shane Stevens
- Billed height: 6 ft 2 in (188 cm)
- Billed weight: 230 lb (104 kg)
- Billed from: Greenwich, Connecticut; New York City
- Trained by: Tom Prichard; Al Snow; Phil Nurse; Sgt. Slaughter; Randy Savage
- Debut: 1988

Shane Brandon McMahon (/məkˈmæn/ mək-MAN; born January 15, 1970) is an American businessman and professional wrestler. He is best known for his various roles with WWE between 1988 and 2024.

The son of Vince McMahon, he is a fourth-generation wrestling promoter as a member of the McMahon family. He began working in WWF (World Wrestling Federation, now WWE) at age 15, starting in their warehouse, where he filled merchandise orders. McMahon was a referee, producer, announcer, and eventually a wrestler, while becoming WWE's Executive Vice President of Global Media behind the scenes. As a wrestler, he has won the European Championship once, the Hardcore Championship, the SmackDown Tag Team Championship, and the WWE World Cup in 2018.

In 2010, he became the CEO of China Broadband Inc., which ultimately became Ideanomics and where he served as executive chairman until 2025. On October 1, 2009, McMahon announced his resignation from WWE. Later that year, he became CEO of entertainment service company YOU On Demand. On July 12, 2013, McMahon stepped down as CEO of YOU On Demand and appointed Weicheng Liu as his successor, while remaining the company's principal executive officer and Vice chairman of the board until 2021, when McMahon was promoted to Executive chairman. In 2016, he returned to WWE where he was a prominently featured figure until October 2019. Between August 2020 and April 2023, he wrestled or appeared at WWE events sporadically, with his final appearance occurring at WrestleMania 39.

== Early life ==
Shane Brandon McMahon was born on January 15, 1970, in Gaithersburg, Maryland, to Vince and Linda McMahon. He has one younger sister, Stephanie McMahon. After graduating from Greenwich High School in 1987, he attended Bridgton Academy in Bridgton, Maine. He then attended Boston University and in 1993 earned a degree in communications.

== Professional wrestling career ==
=== World Wrestling Federation/Entertainment (1988–2009) ===
==== Early years (1988–1997) ====
McMahon began his on-screen career as a referee named Shane Stevens. As Shane Stevens, McMahon refereed during the inaugural Royal Rumble match on January 24, 1988, and he was the first performer to walk out to greet the audience at WrestleMania VI on April 1, 1990. McMahon stopped performing as a referee and became a backstage official at WrestleMania VIII on April 5, 1992, in an attempt to break up a storyline brawl between Randy Savage and Ric Flair. McMahon mainly worked behind the scenes, launching WWF.com in 1997.

==== The Corporation (1998–2000) ====
McMahon made his first appearances as a regular on-air character in early 1998 during the Attitude Era, when he was one of the main WWF executives negotiating with Mike Tyson during Tyson's heavily-hyped involvement at WrestleMania XIV on March 29. He became a recurring part of his father's on-air feud with Stone Cold Steve Austin. In the early days of that angle, McMahon offered support for his father in cameo roles, but he did not become an enforcer like Gerald Brisco and Pat Patterson. McMahon was a color commentator on Sunday Night Heat alongside Jim Cornette and later Kevin Kelly, and announced with Jerry Lawler on the 1999 video game WWF Attitude. Concurrently with this, Shane took on the role as a regular character, turning on his father by signing Austin to a contract after Vince demoted him to the position of referee. At Survivor Series on November 15, Shane turned heel by turning on Austin and became an official member of The Corporation.

In February 1999, McMahon moved away from the commentary role on Heat and became a key component in the Corporation angle, winning the European Championship from X-Pac on the February 15 episode of Raw is War. The two met in a rematch at WrestleMania XV on March 28; McMahon got help from his childhood friends the Mean Street Posse and Triple H, who turned on X-Pac during the match, to retain the championship. McMahon retired the title on the April 4 episode of Heat, wanting to retire as an "undefeated champion". McMahon later gave the title to Mideon, who found it in McMahon's duffel bag, thus reactivating it.

After WrestleMania, Vince briefly made his second face run and Shane took control of the Corporation. With wrestlers such as Triple H in this new faction, Shane feuded with his father and a new faction made up of former Corporation members, The Union. On the UPN pilot for SmackDown!, Shane joined forces with The Undertaker and the Ministry of Darkness to form the Corporate Ministry. Eventually, Vince was revealed to be the mastermind behind this faction, and his face turn was explained to be a plot to get the WWF Championship off Austin. Austin met Shane and Vince in a ladder match at the King of the Ring on June 27 for ownership of the WWF, as in the storyline, Austin had 50%, which was assigned to him by Linda and Stephanie McMahon, upset by Vince and Shane's complicity in the storyline kidnapping of Stephanie by the Corporate Ministry, while Vince and Shane each had 25%. Shane and Vince won the match when a mystery associate raised the briefcase out of Austin's reach when he climbed the ladder, allowing Vince and Shane to grab the case and regain 100% ownership of the WWF. In 1999, McMahon was awarded the Pro Wrestling Illustrated Rookie of the Year award but he declined to accept it stating "These are for the boys, not me".

With his ownership reinstated, McMahon shifted his sights to, then babyface, Test, who was kayfabe dating Shane's sister, Stephanie. Shane disapproved of the relationship, feeling Stephanie was dating "beneath the family's standards", and wound up feuding with Test. With help from the Mean Street Posse, McMahon made Test's life a living hell. At SummerSlam on August 22, McMahon met Test in a "Love Her or Leave Her" match, with the stipulation being that if McMahon won the match, Test and Stephanie could no longer see each other, and if he lost, McMahon would give his blessings to the pair. Test was able to get the win, and McMahon eventually settled his differences with Test, thus making his second face run by becoming his ally. As his father, Vince, feuded with Triple H, Shane was attacked in early December 1999 by Triple H and D-Generation X (DX). He was thrown off the stage in a gang-style attack, in which Billy Gunn and Road Dogg prevented members of the Corporation from saving Shane. Later in the year, Stephanie turned heel, siding with her new kayfabe husband then-heel, Triple H (the two began their off-screen relationship around this time, but did not marry in real life until 2003). With that, the McMahon-Helmsley Faction began, and all of the other McMahons disappeared from television.

At No Way Out on February 27, 2000, Shane made his return as a heel again by trying to help Big Show defeat The Rock; these efforts failed as Vince returned the next Monday night on Raw Is War, when the Rock got a rematch against Big Show and helped The Rock win the match. This started the road to WrestleMania 2000 on April 2, wherein the four-way main event each wrestler had a McMahon in his corner. The Rock had Vince, Big Show had Shane, Triple H had Stephanie, and Mick Foley had Shane's mother, Linda McMahon. Big Show was the first man eliminated, and soon after he and Shane went their separate ways. This led to a match between the two at Judgment Day on May 21, which McMahon won after receiving help from Test and Albert, among others. Over the course of the next several months, McMahon allied himself with other heel wrestlers, specially Chris Benoit in his feud over the WWF Championship with The Rock. He was also aligned with Edge and Christian, who helped him win the Hardcore Championship from Steve Blackman on the August 21 episode of Raw is War. McMahon met Blackman in a rematch at SummerSlam on August 27, losing the title after falling 50 feet (15 m) through the stage. McMahon climbed up the set and tried to run away from Blackman, who gave chase and hit Shane with a Singapore cane, knocking him off. McMahon disappeared from television, making occasional cameo appearances.

==== The Alliance (2001–2002) ====
In 2001, Shane made his third face run by once again feuding with his father, Vince. The feud with Vince was due to the elder McMahon's (kayfabe) affair with Trish Stratus and Vince's spite and demand to divorce Linda McMahon. As fate would have it, rival World Championship Wrestling (WCW) was sold to the World Wrestling Federation (WWF) one week before the Father versus Son match at WrestleMania X-Seven on April 1. In terms of the storyline, Vince demanded that Ted Turner sign the contract at WrestleMania. With Vince's ego getting the best of him, Shane was able to seize the opportunity and purchase WCW himself, to the shock of Vince. McMahon defeated Vince at WrestleMania in a Street Fight. At Backlash on April 29, McMahon debuted his theme song "Here Comes The Money" and was in a Last Man Standing match against Big Show. McMahon performed the Leap of Faith (from the top of the scaffolding), knocking himself and Big Show out. Test helped McMahon to his feet, causing McMahon to get the victory.

McMahon began a feud with Kurt Angle. By King of the Ring on June 24, McMahon's feud with Angle had culminated. After already participating in two tournament matches that night, Angle wrestled McMahon in a Street Fight. After a suplex on the hard floor, Angle was thought to have cracked his tailbone. Angle also delivered an overhead belly to belly suplex through the plated glass stage set, but McMahon did not break through on the first attempt, causing him to fall head-first onto the concrete floor. After a successful second attempt, Angle was to put him through a second plate back out to the stage and again failed two more times. Angle proceeded to bodily hurl him through the plate glass. The match also had Shane missing a shooting star press and landing on a trash can, and ended with Angle performing the Angle Slam off the top rope before scoring the victory over a bloodied McMahon.

McMahon began to lead his WCW wrestlers against his father and the WWF wrestlers, turning heel by joining forces with Paul Heyman and his brand of Extreme Championship Wrestling (ECW) wrestlers, along with their new owner, McMahon's sister Stephanie McMahon-Helmsley. Calling themselves The Alliance, they pledged to finally run the WWF (and specifically their father) out of business. Ultimately, The Invasion came to a head at Survivor Series on November 18 in a match to determine which power would ultimately have control. The team, each respectively representing The Alliance and the WWF, of McMahon, Stone Cold Steve Austin, Kurt Angle, Rob Van Dam, and Booker T lost to the team of The Rock, Chris Jericho, The Undertaker, Kane, and Big Show. The following night on Raw, Vince publicly fired both Shane and Stephanie, which Shane took in stride, admitting that he lost to the better man, while Stephanie pleaded with her father before being forcefully removed from the arena. Aside from a brief appearance on the July 15, 2002 episode of Raw, McMahon would not be seen on television for almost two years.

==== Feud with Kane and hiatus (2003–2005) ====
McMahon made his first on-screen appearance in two years on an episode of SmackDown! before WrestleMania XIX, watching his father's training in the gym to prepare his match against Hulk Hogan. At WrestleMania on March 30, 2003, he went to check on his father's welfare following a Street Fight with Hulk Hogan, with Hogan welcoming Shane in the ring and walking out. He returned as a face in the summer by getting involved in a feud with Eric Bischoff, who had made improper remarks and gestures to Shane's mother Linda. He defeated Bischoff in a Falls Count Anywhere match at SummerSlam on August 24. McMahon also got involved in a bitter rivalry with Kane after Kane gave Linda a Tombstone Piledriver because she did not name him the number one contender to the World Heavyweight Championship. Their feud culminated in McMahon losing a Last Man Standing match at Unforgiven on September 21 and an Ambulance match at Survivor Series on November 16.

After Survivor Series, McMahon left Raw to focus his attention on the executive creative staff and his new family. At WrestleMania XX on March 14, 2004, McMahon appeared briefly on camera during the opening of the event with Vince and his newborn son, Declan. On a special 3-hour episode of Raw on October 3, 2005, billed as WWE Homecoming, all four members of the McMahon family were given a Stone Cold Stunner by Stone Cold Steve Austin. The following week, Vince demanded an apology from ringside commentators for not coming to his family's aid, which developed into a new feud. McMahon also appeared at Survivor Series on November 27, though he did not appear on television. He can be seen on the DVD extra backstage talking to Theodore Long, when The Boogeyman tried to scare off McMahon, who made no deal about it.

==== Feud with D-Generation X and Bobby Lashley (2006–2007) ====
McMahon returned in 2006 as a heel by again siding with his father to help in the feud with Shawn Michaels. At the Royal Rumble on January 29, Shane (despite not competing in the match) eliminated Michaels from the Royal Rumble match by throwing him over the top rope. After weeks of attacks from behind by Shane, one of which saw him force an unconscious Michaels to kiss Vince's rear end, Shane and Michaels faced each other in a Street Fight on the March 18 episode of Saturday Night's Main Event XXXII. In a fashion similar to the real-life Montreal Screwjob, Shane put Michaels in the Sharpshooter as Vince called for the bell and gave Shane the victory. The McMahons' feud with Michaels took a religious turn at WrestleMania 22 on April 2, where Michaels defeated Vince McMahon. Vince claimed that Michaels's victory was a result of "divine intervention" and booked himself and his son in a match at Backlash on April 30 against Michaels and his tag team partner "God". Around this time, Vince began to act strangely and at one point considered himself a god. Shane, who at this time was referred to by Vince as "the product of his semen", teamed with Vince to defeat Michaels and "God" at Backlash, due to help from the Spirit Squad.

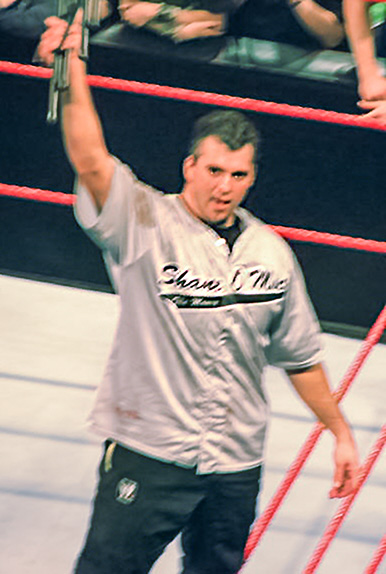
McMahon in 2007

This feud later enveloped Triple H, who the McMahons had enlisted to take out Michaels. Triple H was getting frustrated with this, as it was distracting from his quest to regain the WWE Championship. Triple H wound up bashing Shane with his signature weapon, the sledgehammer, in what was considered to be an accident that put Shane out of the ring for a while. Vince (and later Shane, who had recovered) sought to humble Triple H and get some retribution. Triple H began a feud with the McMahons shortly after, leading to his siding with Shawn Michaels and the reformation of D-Generation X (DX). At SummerSlam on August 20, the McMahons were defeated by DX. About a month later at Unforgiven on September 17, The McMahons and then ECW World Champion Big Show faced DX in a Hell in a Cell match. Shane was injured after Michaels' elbow dropped a chair which was around Shane's neck. DX emerged victorious at Unforgiven, and Shane disappeared from television, thus ending their feud.

On the March 5, 2007 episode of Raw, McMahon came back to inform his father, Vince, about the "guest referee" for the "Battle of the Billionaires." He told him that their opponents on the Board of Directors had won the vote, 5–4. The McMahons had intended for Shane to be the referee. Instead, the guest referee turned out to be the McMahons' old rival, the Texas rattlesnake Stone Cold Steve Austin. During the "Battle of the Billionaires" match at WrestleMania 23 on April 1, Shane's attempt to interfere on his father's behalf was stopped by Austin. During the match, Shane was able to hit the Coast to Coast dive with a trash can into Bobby Lashley's face. On the April 9 episode of Raw, Shane officially joined the Vince/Umaga/Lashley feud when he faced Lashley for the ECW World Championship in a Title vs. Hair match which ended in Shane getting disqualified on purpose by punching the referee. After the match, Umaga, Vince, and Shane all attacked Lashley. At Backlash on April 29 in a handicap match for the ECW World Championship, Shane along with Vince and Umaga defeated Lashley for the title. Vince gained the pin making him the ECW World Champion. At Judgment Day on May 20, Lashley faced Shane, Vince, and Umaga again, in a rematch for the ECW World Championship. This time, Lashley won the match, but since he pinned Shane rather than Vince, Vince remained the champion. At One Night Stand on June 3, Shane and Umaga tried to help Vince retain the ECW World Championship against Lashley, but failed when Lashley speared Vince and pinned him for the win, ending their feud.

On the taped episode of Raw that aired on September 3, Shane, along with his mother Linda and his sister Stephanie, made appearances to confront Vince about his illegitimate child. Shane returned at Survivor Series on November 18 to accompany Hornswoggle, alongside his father, in his match against The Great Khali. After that, he was only seen on WWE's pay-per-view No Way Out on February 17, 2008, talking to Big Show after the latter had his nose legitimately broken going by the plan to push Mayweather's speed by Floyd Mayweather Jr. before again not being seen until June.

==== Feud with The Legacy and departure (2008–2009) ====
After the severe injury that Vince McMahon sustained on the June 23 episode of Raw when a sign fell on top of him during his hosting of the "Million Dollar Mania" sweepstakes, Shane requested for the Raw roster to stand together during what was a turbulent time. Shane's plea, however, was ignored and subsequently, Shane and his sister Stephanie urged the roster to show solidarity. On the July 28 episode of Raw, Shane made an appearance to announce Mike Adamle as his and Stephanie's choice to be the new Raw general manager. After Adamle stepped down as general manager, he and Stephanie became the interim on-screen authority figures for the Raw program. On the November 24 episode of Raw, Shane and Stephanie argued over who was in charge, leading to Stephanie telling him that Raw is her show. After being slapped by Stephanie, Shane finished the segment by telling her that from that day onwards, he was going to watch Stephanie run Raw "right into the ground".

At the start of 2009, Randy Orton began a feud with the McMahon family. On the January 19 episode of Raw, Orton punted Mr. McMahon in the head, after he had tried to fire Orton from the company for previous comments made about Stephanie. The following week, Shane returned to television and attacked Orton for his actions, turning face for the first time since 2006. On the February 2 episode of Raw, it was revealed that Orton challenged Shane to a No Holds Barred match at No Way Out on February 15, to which he accepted, but was defeated by Orton in the match. The following night on Raw, Shane challenged Orton to a match for that episode's main event. The match ended with Orton punting Shane in the head, as well as performing an RKO on Stephanie McMahon.

Shane returned on the March 30 episode of Raw, alongside Triple H and his father Vince McMahon, to confront and attack The Legacy (Randy Orton, Ted DiBiase, and Cody Rhodes). On the April 6 episode of Raw, it was announced that Shane would compete in a six-man tag team match against The Legacy at Backlash on April 26 alongside Triple H and Batista, the latter of whom had returned from injury, where the stipulation was that if any member of Orton's team pinned any member of Triple H's team, Orton would win Triple H's WWE Championship; however, if any member of Orton's team was counted out or disqualified, Triple H would retain the title. On the May 4 episode of Raw, Shane's character suffered a broken leg and ankle at the hands of Orton and Legacy as a way to write him out of the story. On October 1, 2009, Shane departed WWE.

=== Return to WWE (2016–2024) ===
==== Commissioner of Smackdown and various feuds (2016–2017) ====
On the February 22, 2016 episode of Raw, Shane returned to WWE as a babyface for the first time in nearly seven years, interrupting his sister, Stephanie McMahon, receiving the "Vincent J. McMahon Legacy of Excellence" Award from their father, Vince McMahon. Shane announced that the reason he had returned was that he wanted control of Raw, leading to Vince placing Shane in a Hell in a Cell match at WrestleMania 32 on April 3 against The Undertaker, adding the stipulation that Shane would get control of Raw and The Undertaker would no longer be a participant in future WrestleMania events if Shane were to win the match. At WrestleMania, Shane attempted a Leap of Faith off the top of the cell, but The Undertaker moved out of the way, and Shane fell through an announce table. Shane was defeated by The Undertaker soon after.

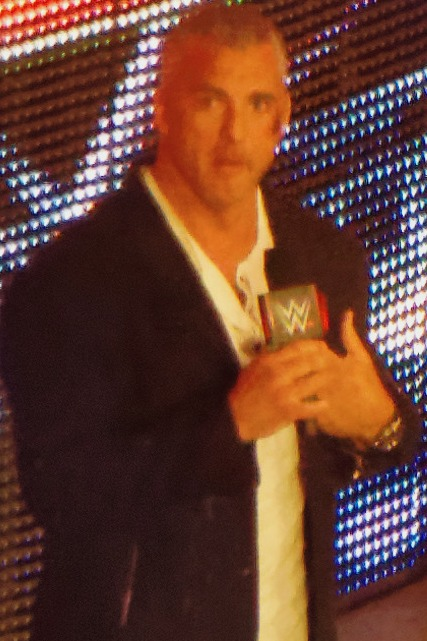
McMahon during a Raw show in April 2016

Despite losing at WrestleMania, Shane controlled Raw for a month, firstly by his father, Vince, on the Raw after WrestleMania, then for the following three weeks after "popular demand on social media". This led to Stephanie confronting Shane, telling him that their father will decide who will control Raw at Payback on May 1, where Vince announced that both Shane and Stephanie would be Co-general managers and have joint control of WWE.

In July, after the announcement of the return of the brand extension with SmackDown moving to Tuesday, Vince appointed Shane as the storyline commissioner of the SmackDown brand and Stephanie as the commissioner of Raw before tasking them to name a general manager for their respective shows. Shane appointed Daniel Bryan as the general manager of SmackDown. At SummerSlam on August 21, Brock Lesnar won his match against Randy Orton by technical knockout and continued to assault Orton as he was being tended to. Shane confronted Lesnar, which resulted in Shane being attacked by Lesnar with an F-5. On the November 8 episode of SmackDown Live, Shane agreed to replace an injured Baron Corbin in the traditional Survivor Series tag team elimination match between the two brands. At Survivor Series on November 20, Team SmackDown defeated Team Raw. McMahon suffered a legitimate concussion following a spear from Roman Reigns, resulting in his elimination. In December, McMahon would take over host duties for Talking Smack with Daniel Bryan taking time off for family reasons.

On the February 21, 2017 episode of SmackDown Live, after AJ Styles and Luke Harper simultaneously eliminated each other in a number one contender's battle royal as the final two entrants, McMahon made singles match between the two for the February 28 episode of SmackDown Live with the winner going on to face Bray Wyatt for the WWE Championship at WrestleMania 33 on April 2. Styles would originally go on to win the match before McMahon would restart the contest due to Harper having his foot on the rope during the pinfall. After McMahon accidentally distracted Harper, Styles would capitalize and pin Harper once again. That same week, after Randy Orton turned on Wyatt and cashed in his Royal Rumble winning opportunity, McMahon would go on to book a number one contender's match and the now even more infuriated Styles lost to Orton on the March 7 episode of SmackDown Live. After losing the match, Styles would confront McMahon in the Gorilla position with things getting physical between the pair. The following week, Styles attacked McMahon inside the parking lot, which caused McMahon to be busted open and suffer a storyline concussion. Due to this, Styles was (kayfabe) "fired" from SmackDown. However, as McMahon was about to leave, he went back to the arena and announced that he will face Styles at WrestleMania 33. On April 2, at WrestleMania 33, McMahon lost to AJ Styles in a singles match. On April 4, the first episode of SmackDown Live after WrestleMania, McMahon and Styles shook hands, ending the feud.

==== Feud with Kevin Owens and Sami Zayn (2017–2018) ====
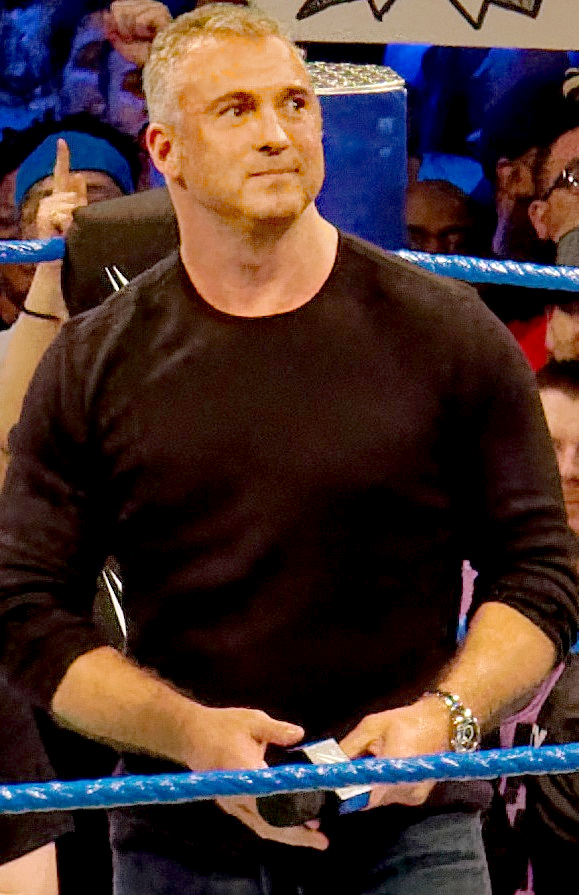
McMahon in April 2018

On the August 1 episode of SmackDown, McMahon had a serious argument with Kevin Owens due to losing to AJ Styles for the United States Championship. Owens demanded a competent referee, so Daniel Bryan chose McMahon to become the special guest referee. The following week on SmackDown, McMahon was accidentally attacked by Styles during a brawl between Styles and Owens. Following the incident, on the August 15 episode of SmackDown, McMahon warned Styles that if he puts his hands on him, he will put his hands on Styles. The warning later came to Owens after he accidentally attacked McMahon. At SummerSlam, McMahon was about to count the pin and declare Owens the winner, however after seeing Styles' foot on the bottom rope, McMahon continued the match. A frustrated Owens pushed McMahon, causing McMahon to push Owens back. This caused a distraction for Styles to win back the United States Championship. On the August 22 episode of SmackDown, McMahon allowed a rematch between Styles and Owens. During the match, McMahon made himself referee after seeing the poor officiating from guest referee Baron Corbin, which caused a confrontation from Owens. This allowed Styles to take advantage and pin Owens to retain the championship. On the September 5 episode of SmackDown, after a brief confrontation with Owens, McMahon proceeded to beat down Owens after warning him not to talk about his family. Soon after, Daniel Bryan came out to announce that Shane had been "suspended indefinitely" by Vince McMahon, who would be returning to SmackDown next week. On the September 12 episode of SmackDown, CEO and Chairman of WWE, Vince announced that Shane would be facing Owens at Hell in a Cell, in a Hell in a Cell match. At Hell in a Cell, Owens won after being saved by Sami Zayn from McMahon's Leap of Faith from the top of the cell to the announcer's table, was dragged by Zayn to pin McMahon.

On the October 23 episode of Raw, McMahon fired the first shot in the build of the SmackDown-Raw feud for Survivor Series when he appeared with most of the SmackDown roster to attack the Raw roster, after initially being friendly with Kurt Angle earlier on in the same night. They proceeded to beat up wrestlers part of the Raw roster and bring Angle back to the ring. McMahon told Angle to bring his gold medal and the remains of the roster to Survivor Series and that at Survivor Series, they would finish what they started. However, several weeks later, on the November 14 edition of SmackDown, during the main event between The New Day vs Kevin Owens and Sami Zayn, The Shield announced their presence and came down to the ring to face The New Day in payback for The New Day's distraction on the November 6 episode of Raw costing Seth Rollins and Dean Ambrose the WWE Raw Tag Team Championship. Worse was to come, as when The Usos tried to help, they were attacked by Cesaro and Sheamus, the Raw women's locker room attacked the SmackDown women's locker room, and when the rest of the SmackDown male roster came down with McMahon to the ring to help, they were attacked in turn by the rest of the Raw male roster, including Angle and Braun Strowman. Shane was given two triple powerbombs by The Shield, and an Angle Slam by Angle, as retribution for the trouble the SmackDown roster pulled on Raw the last couple of weeks, and to prove that come to the pay-per-view, Team Raw would be victorious over Team SmackDown. At Survivor Series, Shane was the last man to be eliminated by Triple H, meaning Team SmackDown lost.

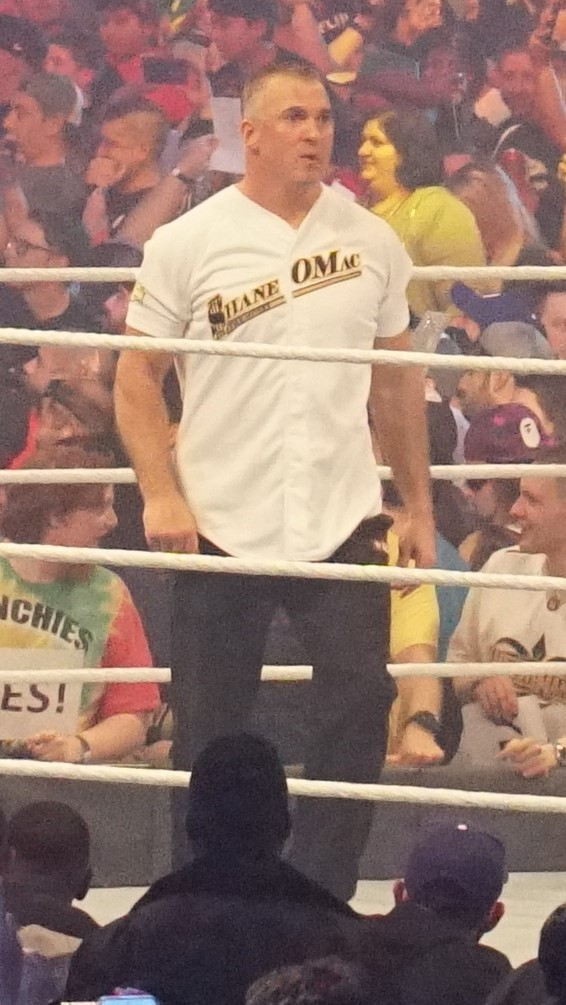
McMahon at WrestleMania 34

On March 11, 2018, at Fastlane, Shane McMahon pulled the referee out of the ring when Kevin Owens covered Dolph Ziggler and pulled Sami Zayn out of the ring when he covered Kevin Owens. On the March 13 episode of SmackDown, Shane McMahon announced his indefinite leave of absence as SmackDown's commissioner. Kevin Owens and Sami Zayn proceeded to attack Shane McMahon in the ring and behind the entrance. Shane (kayfabe) suffered a laryngeal contusion, trapezius, and rhomboid strains. He was taken to a local medical facility. On March 26, 2018, WWE.com reported that Shane legitimately had acute diverticulitis while resting with his family in the Caribbean on March 14, and was hospitalized in Antigua for a few days before he was moved to a hospital in New York where doctors also found that Shane has an umbilical hernia that required surgery once the infection was eradicated. McMahon posted the below message to his Instagram account: "Thank you, everyone, for the get well wishes. It truly helps. I'm healing up, and I have the best medicine in the world with me." It was announced that Shane would team up with Daniel Bryan against Owens and Zayn at WrestleMania 34. McMahon returned on the April 3 episode of SmackDown, to address his WrestleMania match, saying that Owens and Zayn would never be seen in a SmackDown arena again. At WrestleMania, Bryan and McMahon defeated Zayn and Owens to end their feud.

He competed at the Greatest Royal Rumble, where he entered the namesake match at No. 47 before being eliminated after getting choke slammed off the top rope through a table by Braun Strowman. He took time off to heal from the injuries he suffered two months prior, returning on the 1000th edition of SmackDown on October 16 alongside Stephanie McMahon and Vince McMahon on the Truth TV segment hosted by R-Truth and Carmella. Following TLC: Tables, Ladders, & Chairs in December, The McMahon Family (Vince, Stephanie, Shane, and Triple H) appeared on Raw and announced that they would be running both Raw and SmackDown as a group with no general managers.

==== Best in the World (2018–2019) ====
At the Crown Jewel event in November, he replaced The Miz after the latter suffered a (kayfabe) injury in the finals of the WWE World Cup, and won by defeating Dolph Ziggler in under three minutes, winning the tournament. The Miz began a pursuit to form a tag team with McMahon, who finally agreed, and the duo faced SmackDown Tag Team Champions The Bar (Cesaro and Sheamus) at the Royal Rumble pay-per-view, winning the titles. At Elimination Chamber the following month, however, they lost the titles to The Usos (Jey Uso and Jimmy Uso), and failed to regain them at Fastlane, after which, McMahon attacked The Miz and taunted The Miz's father, turning heel in the process. McMahon began proclaiming himself as the "Best in the World" and scheduled a match between himself and The Miz at WrestleMania 35, which The Miz requested to be a Falls Count Anywhere match, and McMahon agreed. At WrestleMania, McMahon narrowly defeated The Miz after being superplexed off a 15-foot platform and landing on top of The Miz for the 3 counts although both men were unconscious. On the April 29 episode of Raw, McMahon helped Bobby Lashley defeat The Miz, who was drafted to Raw, and McMahon attacked The Miz. Later that night, The Miz challenged McMahon to a Steel Cage Match at Money in the Bank, which McMahon accepted.

While simultaneously feuding with The Miz on Raw, over on SmackDown, Elias and Roman Reigns were drafted to the brand. Shane's father Vince introduced Elias as SmackDown's biggest acquisition on the April 16 episode of SmackDown Live. The two were confronted by Reigns, who attacked Elias and attacked Vince with the Superman Punch. The following week, Shane called out Reigns for a fight for attacking his father, but Reigns was attacked from behind by Elias, who was assisted by Shane, allying Elias and Shane. Shane forced Reigns to face The B-Team (Bo Dallas and Curtis Axel) in a handicap match with Elias as the special referee enforcer that Reigns won. The following week on SmackDown Live, Shane teamed with Elias, Daniel Bryan, and Rowan in a seven-man handicap match and defeated the team of Reigns and The Usos. At Money in the Bank, Shane once again defeated The Miz this time by escaping the cage ending their feud. The following night on Raw, Shane confronted Roman Reigns with Reigns challenging Shane to a match at Super ShowDown which Shane accepted. At Super ShowDown, Shane defeated Roman Reigns after interference from Drew McIntyre. Shane and McIntyre lost to Reigns and The Undertaker in a No Holds Barred tag team match at Extreme Rules.

Following this, McMahon re-ignited his feud with Kevin Owens, after Owens stated his distaste in McMahon's constant dominance on television and began to hit him with the Stunner on countless occasions. McMahon lost to Owens at SummerSlam where had Owens lost he would have quit WWE. McMahon later replaced an injured Elias in a semi-final match against Chad Gable for the 2019 King of the Ring tournament, and Owens was made the referee, and despite McMahon's promise to consider dropping a fine for Owens damaging expensive equipment, Owens allowed Gable to win, and Owens was hereby fired. However, Owens continued to appear on television to issue legal threats, until October 4's WWE SmackDown's 20th Anniversary episode, where McMahon was fired after losing a ladder match against Owens, ending their feud.

==== Part-time appearances (2020–2024) ====
After a ten-month hiatus from television, McMahon returned, as a babyface, on the August 3, 2020, episode of Raw as the host of Raw Underground, a segment presented as an unsanctioned fight club. It was canceled after the September 21 episode. On November 22, 2020, he made an in-ring appearance at Survivor Series during The Undertaker's retirement ceremony.

In February, incensed at being left out of Raw's Elimination Chamber match, Braun Strowman started to take issue with McMahon. After a failed attempt to rectify things with Strowman, McMahon began to insult Strowman's intelligence, thus turning heel in the process. Strowman challenged McMahon to a match on the March 15 episode of Raw, in which McMahon won. Strowman challenged McMahon to a Steel Cage match at WrestleMania 37 and McMahon accepted. At the event, McMahon was defeated by Strowman.

McMahon returned at the 2022 Royal Rumble event in the namesake match at number 28, as a face, lasting until the final three, but was eliminated by the eventual winner Brock Lesnar. McMahon received intense criticism by fans, critics, and employees for his role in and the booking of the rumble match for trying to make himself look stronger than the full time wrestlers. Amidst the controversy and backstage heat on February 2, McMahon had been quietly "let go" by the company.

McMahon returned over a year later in April 2023 at WrestleMania 39 alongside Snoop Dogg, in an impromptu match against The Miz; however, he tore his quad muscle early in the match and was unable to continue. Snoop Dogg replaced him and won the match in his place.

In June 2024, it was reported that McMahon was no longer contracted to WWE, ending his second tenure with the company.

== Professional wrestling style and persona ==
McMahon uses a move named "Coast to Coast", where he jumps from the top rope and across the ring, delivering a dropkick to an opponent, usually with a trash can situated in between the opponent's face. Though with the WWE's concerns over concussions he does not use a trash can, instead dropkicking the opponent with no weapon in place. He started using the move after Paul Heyman showed him a video of Rob Van Dam performing the move. He also styles his punches and footwork after Muhammad Ali, and often (in high-risk spots) uses a diving elbow drop named the "Leap of Faith."

== Business career ==
=== WWE ===
Shane McMahon began working in WWE at age 15, starting in their warehouse, where he filled merchandise orders. McMahon was a referee, producer, announcer, and eventually a wrestler on-screen, while becoming WWE's Executive Vice President of Global Media behind the scenes. In 1992, McMahon was already backstage official and working behind the scenes for the company. In 1997, McMahon helped launch WWE's official website. By the year 2000, McMahon was very much a part of the decision process in WWE, and that included creative.

On October 21, 2006, McMahon attended Pride 32 at the Thomas & Mack Center in Paradise, Nevada resulting in speculation that WWE were considering promoting MMA events. On November 17, 2006, WWE and Dream Stage Entertainment officials, the parent company of Pride Fighting Championships, held a meeting at WWE global headquarters in Stamford, Connecticut. The meeting focused on the possibility of the two groups doing some form of business together in the future. Yet on March 27, 2007, Nobuyuki Sakakibara, president of DSE, announced that Station Casinos, Inc. magnate Lorenzo Fertitta, also one of the co-owners of Zuffa, the parent company of the Ultimate Fighting Championship, had made a deal to acquire all the assets of Pride FC from DSE after Pride 34 in a deal worth about US$70 million, thereby ceasing any prospective business between Pride and WWE.

Later in November 2006, McMahon and WWE Canada President Carl De Marco traveled to South America to finalize a major TV deal in Brazil, which allowed their television station to air Raw and SmackDown.

In October 2007, McMahon and De Marco attempted to purchase the Argentine wrestling promotion 100% Lucha to expand WWE's product in South America. The deal fell through due to disagreements between the two parties.

In September 2008, McMahon finalized another major TV deal, this time in Mexico, which allowed WWE programming to air on Mexico's two biggest television networks, Raw on Televisa and SmackDown on TV Azteca.

On October 16, 2009, WWE published a statement from Shane McMahon announcing his resignation from his position as WWE's Executive Vice President of Global Media, and also issued an official press release stating that the resignation was tendered effective January 1, 2010. No specific reason was given for the resignation. McMahon stated in the WWE press release, "Having been associated with this organization for the majority of my life, I feel this is the opportune time in my career to pursue outside ventures", thus ending his 20-year stint with the company on January 1, 2010. McMahon's resignation left only two original members of the McMahon family active within the company: his father, Vince, and his sister, Stephanie.

As of late 2019, McMahon began working as a producer for WWE once again.

In May 2020, it was revealed that the reasons for Shane McMahon's resignation from his role as Executive Vice President of WWE in 2009, was because "he realized that his father Vince, saw his sister Stephanie and her husband Triple H as the heirs to the throne" and "was tired of his father Vince, overlooking his ideas" for what he envisioned for the company. In 2022, however, it was reported that despite having a part time WWE contract and no major production role with his family's company, McMahon had in fact had a history with booking Royal Rumble matches, with Sean Ross Sapp of Fightful even stating following the controversy surrounding the 2022 Royal Rumble that "Though he wasn't listed as a producer internally for the Royal Rumble, he helped put the match together, which he's done before in the past." Ultimately, the McMahons sold the majority ownership of WWE to Endeavor, the parent of UFC, to form TKO Group Holdings in 2023.

=== Other business ventures ===
In 2010, McMahon became the CEO of China Broadband Inc. In 2013, McMahon stepped down as CEO, but remained the Executive Vice Chairman of the Board of Directors until 2021, when he was promoted to Executive Chairman of the board. The company has undergone several name changes including You On Demand Holdings Inc., Wecast Holdings Inc., Seven Stars Cloud Group Inc., and ultimately, Ideanomics Inc. McMahon resigned in 2025 after the company went bankrupt.

McMahon sat on the board of directors for ISM Group Ltd., International Sports Management Ltd., and International Cricket Management Ltd. from 2010 to 2012. He also sat on the board of directors for International Sports Management Inc., Glaucus Ltd., and Dkrm Holding Ltd. He currently sits on the board of directors for International Sports Management (USA) Inc. and Global Power of Literacy, a not-for-profit corporation.

McMahon is a part owner of the Indian Larry Motorcycle Shop in Brooklyn, New York.

== Personal life ==
McMahon is of Irish and Welsh descent. He is married to Marissa Mazzola. They have three sons.

On July 19, 2017, McMahon was involved in a helicopter crash, but was relatively unharmed.

McMahon is an avid fan of mixed martial arts. He trains in Brazilian Jiu-Jitsu under Renzo Gracie, as well as Muay Thai under Phil Nurse.

== Other media ==
In September 2006, he was named one of Details magazine's "50 Most Powerful Men Under 42" in the annual "power issue".

=== Filmography ===
Feature films
Year	Title	Role	Note
1999	Beyond the Mat	Himself	Documentary
2002	Rollerball	American Media Mogul	Cameo appearance

Television
Year	Title	Role	Note
2019	NCIS: Los Angeles	US Army CID Special Agent Steve Evans	2 episodes

=== Video games ===
Year	Title	Notes
1999	WWF Attitude	Voice Only
1999	WWF WrestleMania 2000	
2000	WWF No Mercy	
2000	WWF SmackDown!	
2000	WWF SmackDown! 2: Know Your Role	
2001	WWF SmackDown! Just Bring It	
2002	WWF WrestleMania X8	
2006	WWE SmackDown vs. Raw 2007	
2007	WWE SmackDown vs. Raw 2008	
2008	WWE SmackDown vs. Raw 2009	Non-Playable Character
2009	WWE SmackDown vs. Raw 2010	Non-Playable Character
2012	WWE '13	
2014	WWE SuperCard	Latest card: WM 34
2015	WWE 2K16	
2016	WWE 2K17	
2016	WWE Champions	
2017	WWE 2K18	
2017	WWE Mayhem	
2018	WWE 2K19	
2019	WWE 2K20	
2020	WWE 2K Battlegrounds	
2022	WWE 2K22	
2023	WWE 2K23	
2024	WWE 2K24	

== Championships and accomplishments ==
- The Baltimore Sun
  - WWE Non-Match Moment of the Year (2016) McMahon returns to RAW
- Pro Wrestling Illustrated
  - Feud of the Year (2001) vs. Vince McMahon
  - Rookie of the Year (1999)
  - Ranked No. 245 of the 500 top singles wrestlers in the PWI 500 in 1999
- Wrestling Observer Newsletter
  - Most Disgusting Promotional Tactic (2003) McMahon family all over WWE products
  - Worst Feud of the Year (2003) vs. Kane
  - Worst Feud of the Year (2006) with Vince McMahon vs. D-Generation X (Shawn Michaels and Triple H)
- WWE/World Wrestling Entertainment/Federation
  - WWF European Championship (1 time)
  - WWF Hardcore Championship (1 time)
  - WWE SmackDown Tag Team Championship (1 time) – with The Miz
  - WWE World Cup (2018)

== Sources ==
- Shawn Michaels and Aaron Feigenbaum (November 22, 2005). Heartbreak And Triumph: The Shawn Michaels Story. World Wrestling Entertainment. pp. 352 pages. ISBN 978-0-7434-9380-2.
- Shaun Assael and Mike Mooneyham (2002). Sex, Lies, and Headlocks: The Real Story of Vince McMahon and World Wrestling Entertainment. Crown. pp. 258 pages. ISBN 1-4000-5143-6.
- "2007 Wrestling Almanac & Book of Facts". Wrestling's Historical Cards. Kappa Publishing. 2007.
