= VIA Motors =

American EV company

VIA Motors, Inc.
- Type: Private
- Founded: 2010
- Headquarters: Orem, Utah, USA
- Key people: Bob Lutz
- Parent: Ideanomics
- Website: viamotors.com

VIA Motors was an American electric vehicle manufacturer based in Orem, Utah. It was founded in 2010.

== History ==
VIA Motors was spun off in November 2010 from Raser Technologies, the engineering company that, in 2009, showed a Hummer H3 said to be capable of returning 100 miles per gallon when fitted with Raser's range-extender plug-in powertrain. Bob Lutz, former vice-chairman of GM credited as "Father of the Chevy Volt", featuring an extended-range electric powertrain called Voltec, joined as chairman in 2011.

In 2011, VIA raised $5.3 million from private investors including Carl Berg. Its fleet customers included Rocky Mountain Power.

In August 2021, Ideanomics announced their intent to acquire VIA Motors for US$630 million. Ideanomics filed for bankruptcy on December 4, 2024 in Delaware, with plans to sell all of its assets, including VIA Motors.

== See also ==
- Bob Lutz
