= Kubota =

Japanese multinational corporation based in Osaka

Kubota Corporation

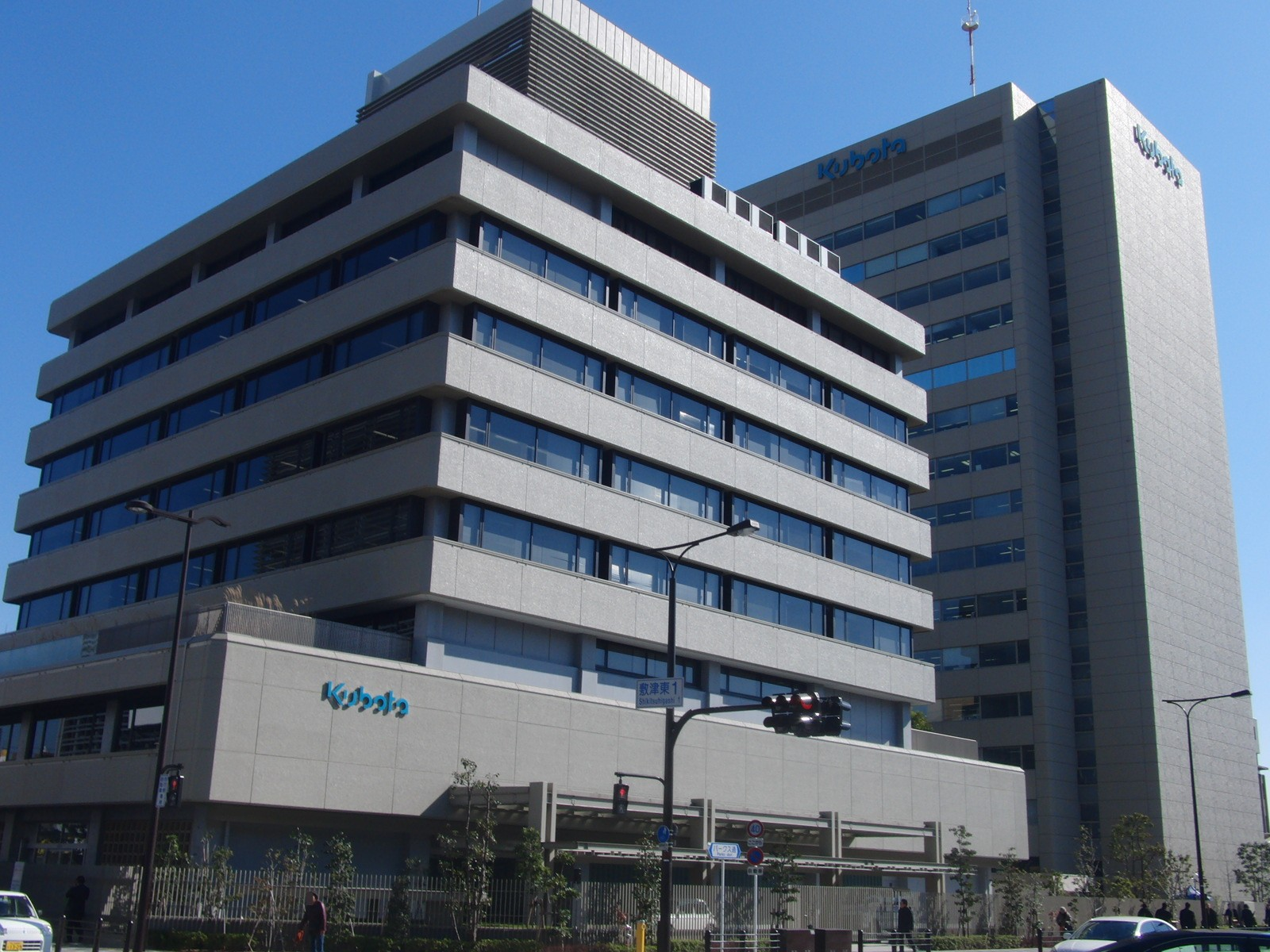
- Kubota headquarters in Naniwa-ku, Osaka, Japan
- Type: Public
- Traded as: TYO: 6326; TOPIX 100 Component; Nikkei 225 Component
- Industry: Agricultural machinery Heavy equipment Machine industry
- Founded: February 1890; 136 years ago, in Osaka, Empire of Japan
- Founder: Gonshiro Kubota
- Headquarters: 2-47, Shikitsuhigashi 1-chome, Naniwa-ku, Osaka 556-8601 Japan
- Key people: Yuichi Kitao (CEO and President)
- Products: Tractors; Combine harvesters; Rice transplanters; Turf care equipment; Construction equipment; Engines; Vending machines; Gearboxes and Axles; Water treatment systems
- Revenue: ▲$ 14.7 billion (FY 2014) (¥ 1,508 billion) (FY 2014)
- Net income: ▲$ 1.28 billion (FY 2014) (¥ 131.66 billion) (FY 2014)
- Number of employees: 38,291 (consolidated as of March 31, 2017)
- Website: www.kubota.com

Kubota Corporation (株式会社クボタ, Kabushiki-kaisha Kubota) is a Japanese multinational corporation based in Osaka. Established in 1890, Kubota manufactures a wide range of products, including tractors and other agricultural machinery, construction equipment, engines, vending machines, pipes, valves, metal castings, pumps, water purification equipment, sewage treatment equipment, and air conditioners.

Kubota produces a variety of diesel and gasoline engines, ranging from single-cylinder naturally aspirated engines for pumps and other small equipment, to high-horsepower straight-six turbocharged tractor engines. Kubota distributes crate engines to other manufacturers, where they are used in agricultural equipment, construction equipment, tractors, and marine propulsion.

Kubota is listed on the first section of Tokyo Stock Exchange and is a constituent of the TOPIX 100 and Nikkei 225.

Kubota is also known for designing 3D graphics chips in the 1990s.

Kubota operates several subsidiaries in North America, including Kubota Tractor in Grapevine, Texas, Kubota Manufacturing of America in Gainesville, Georgia, Kubota Engine America in Lincolnshire, Illinois, and Kubota Canada in Pickering, Ontario. These companies manufacture, market, and distribute Kubota products throughout the region.

== Gallery ==
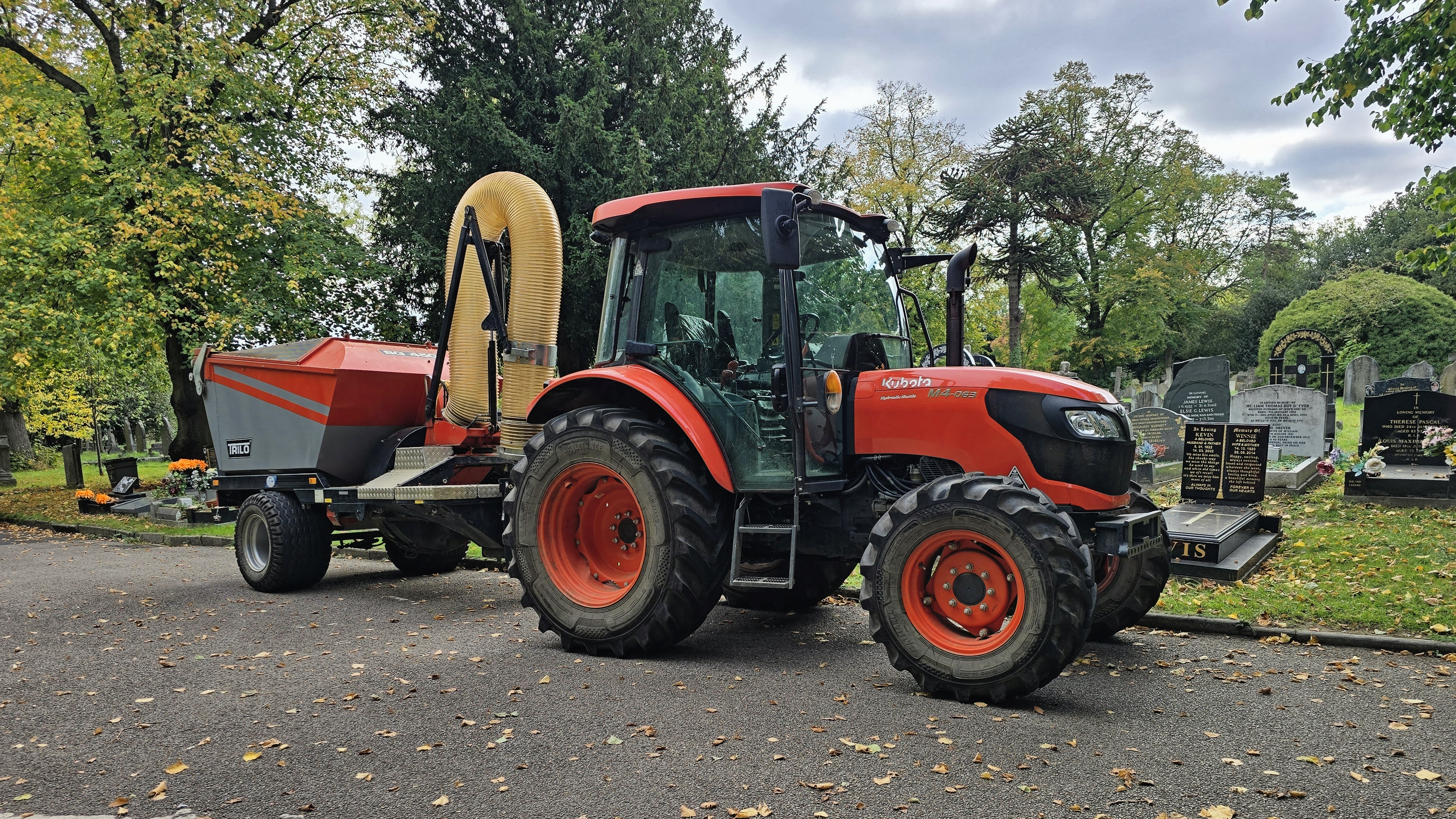
Kubota M4-063 tractor with trailer

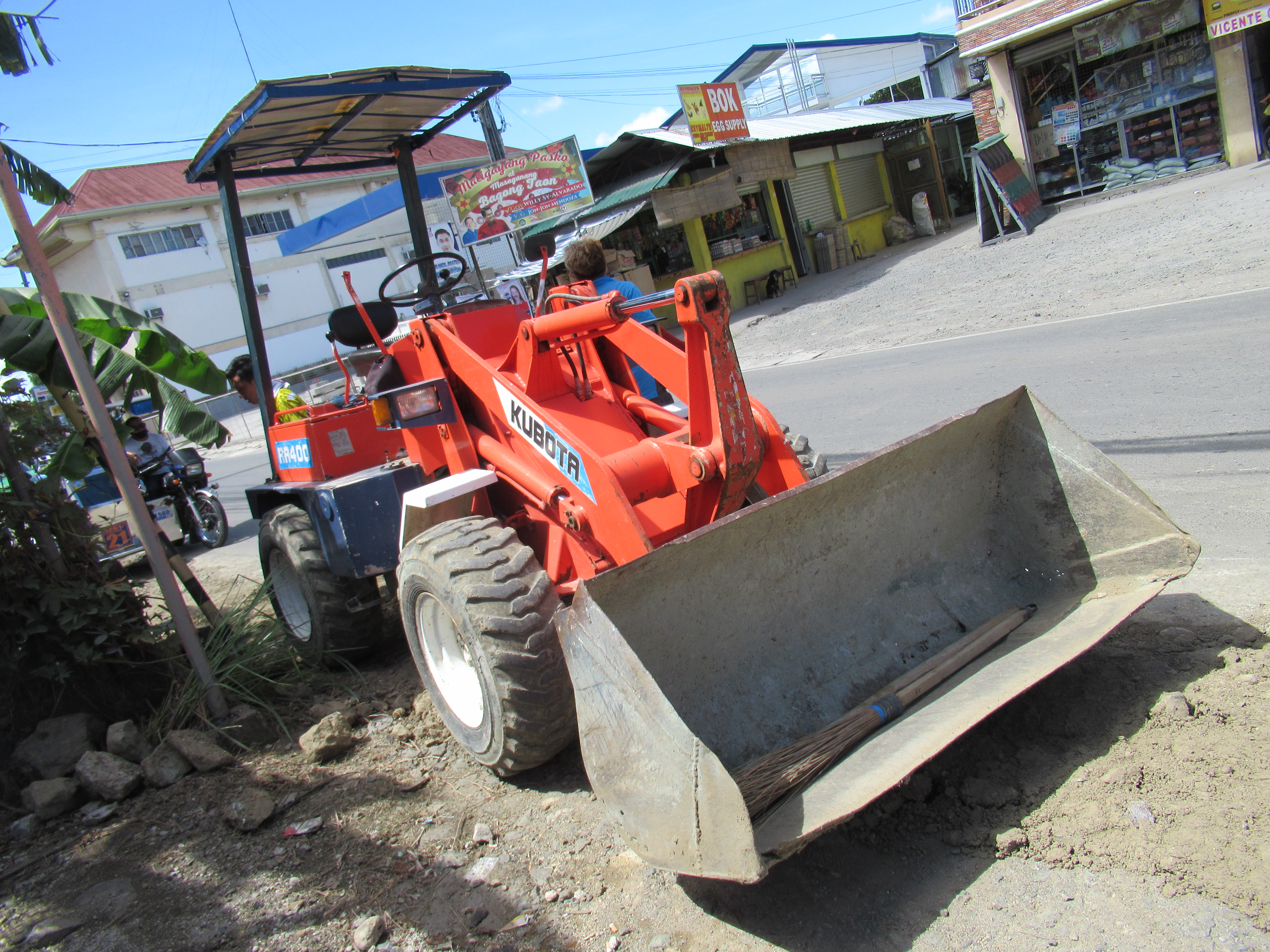
Kubota wheel loader

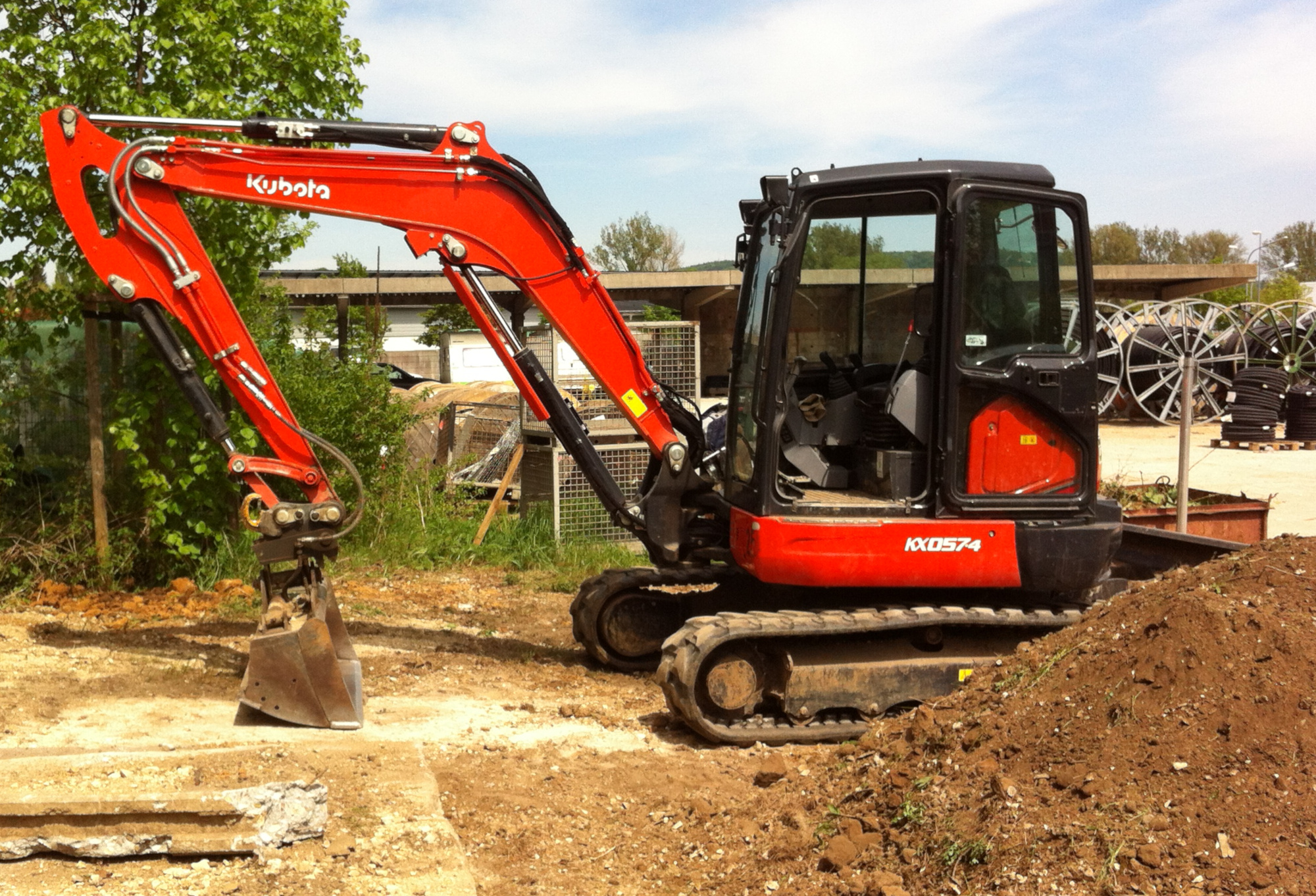
Kubota mini excavator

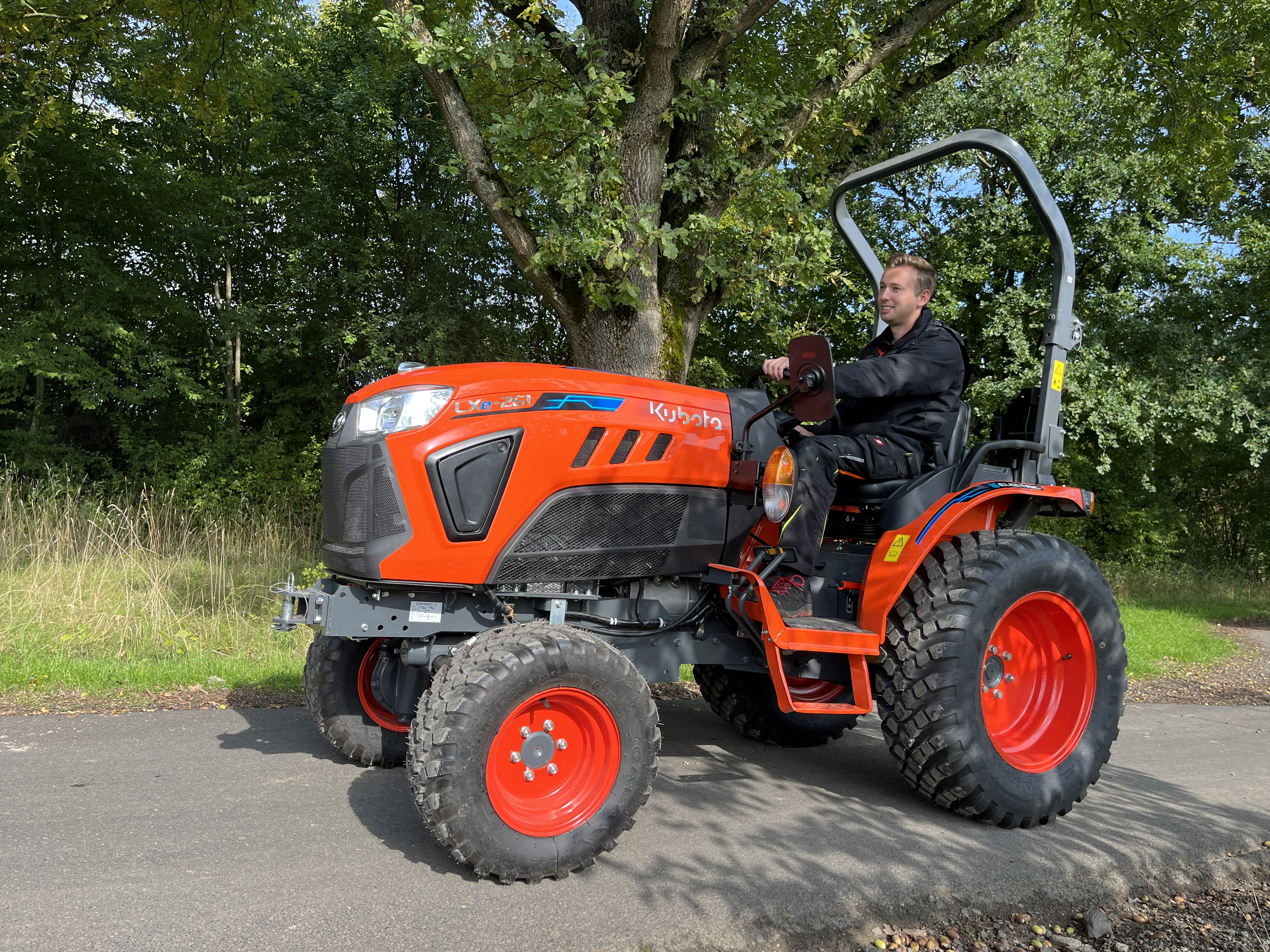
Kubota LXe electric tractor

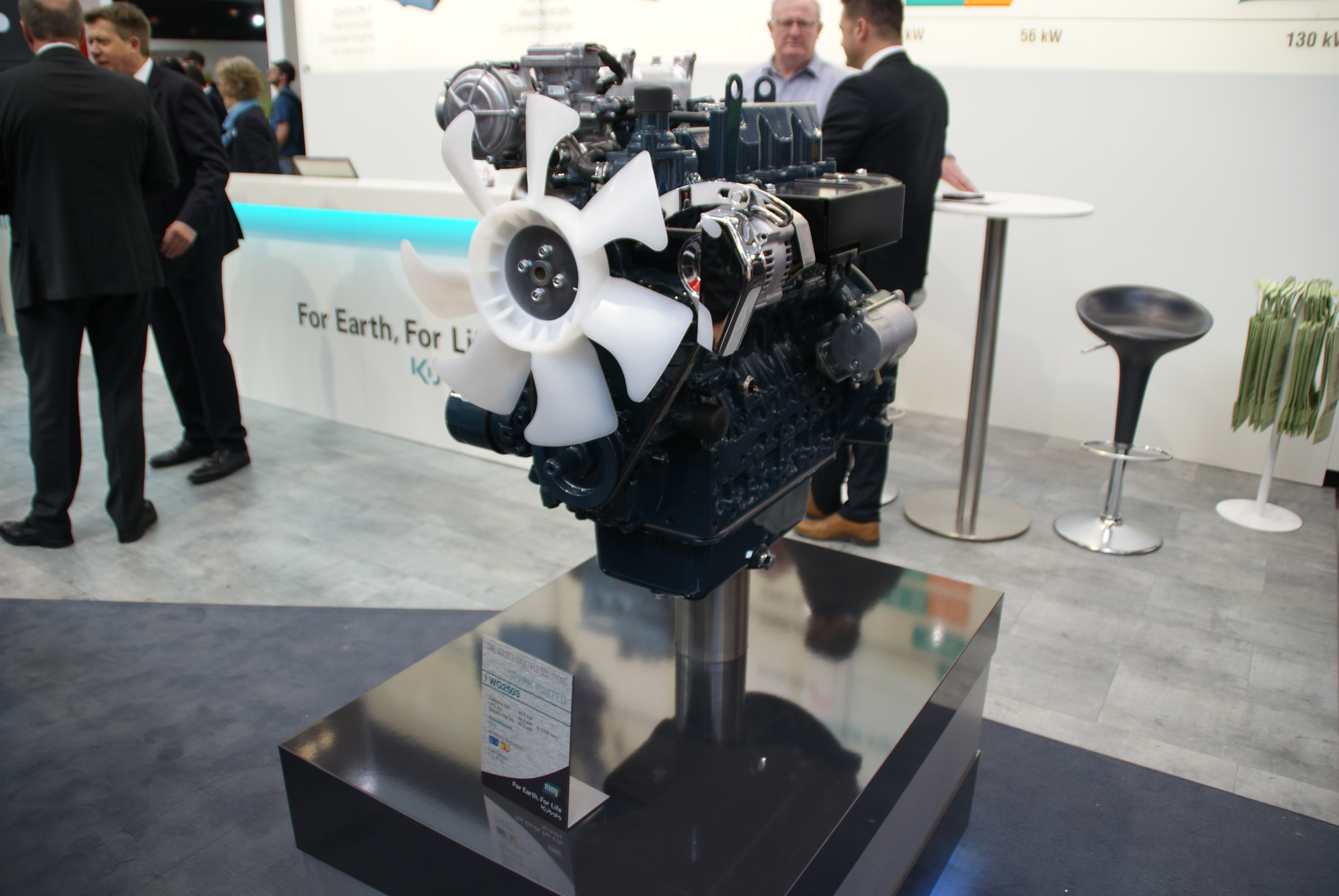
Close up of a Kubota engine

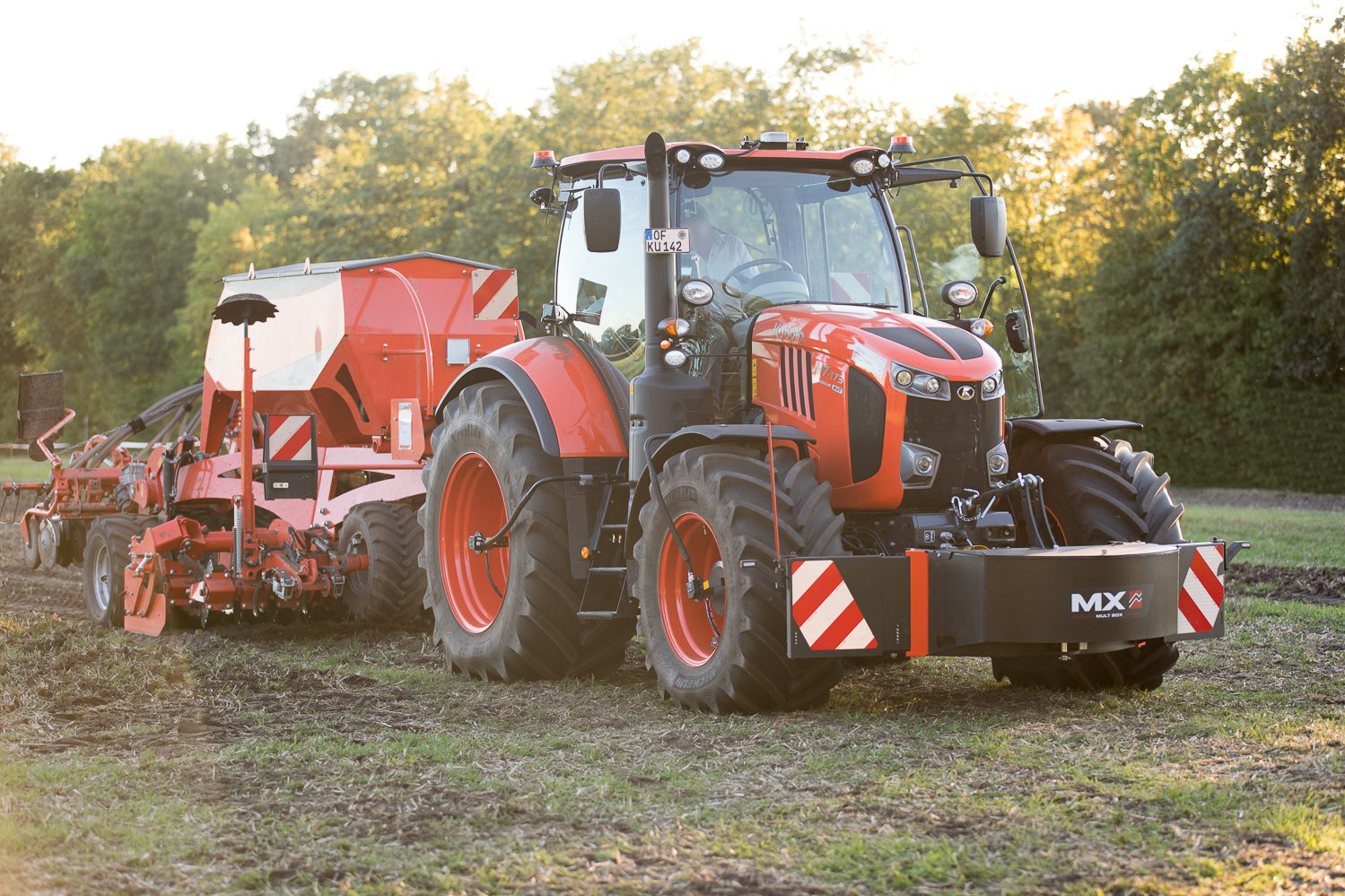
Kubota M7-173 Premium KVT with sower

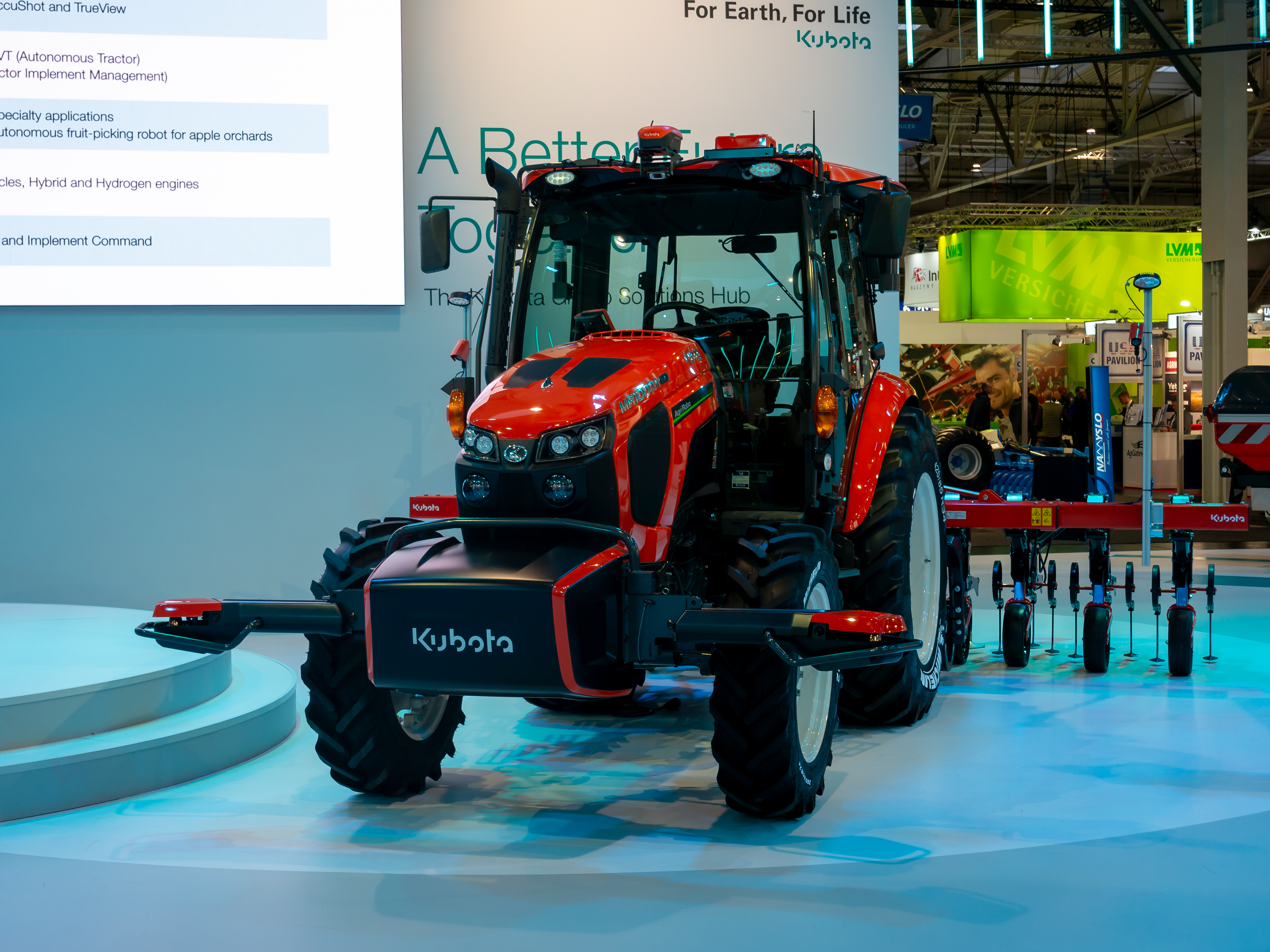
MR100A automated tractor

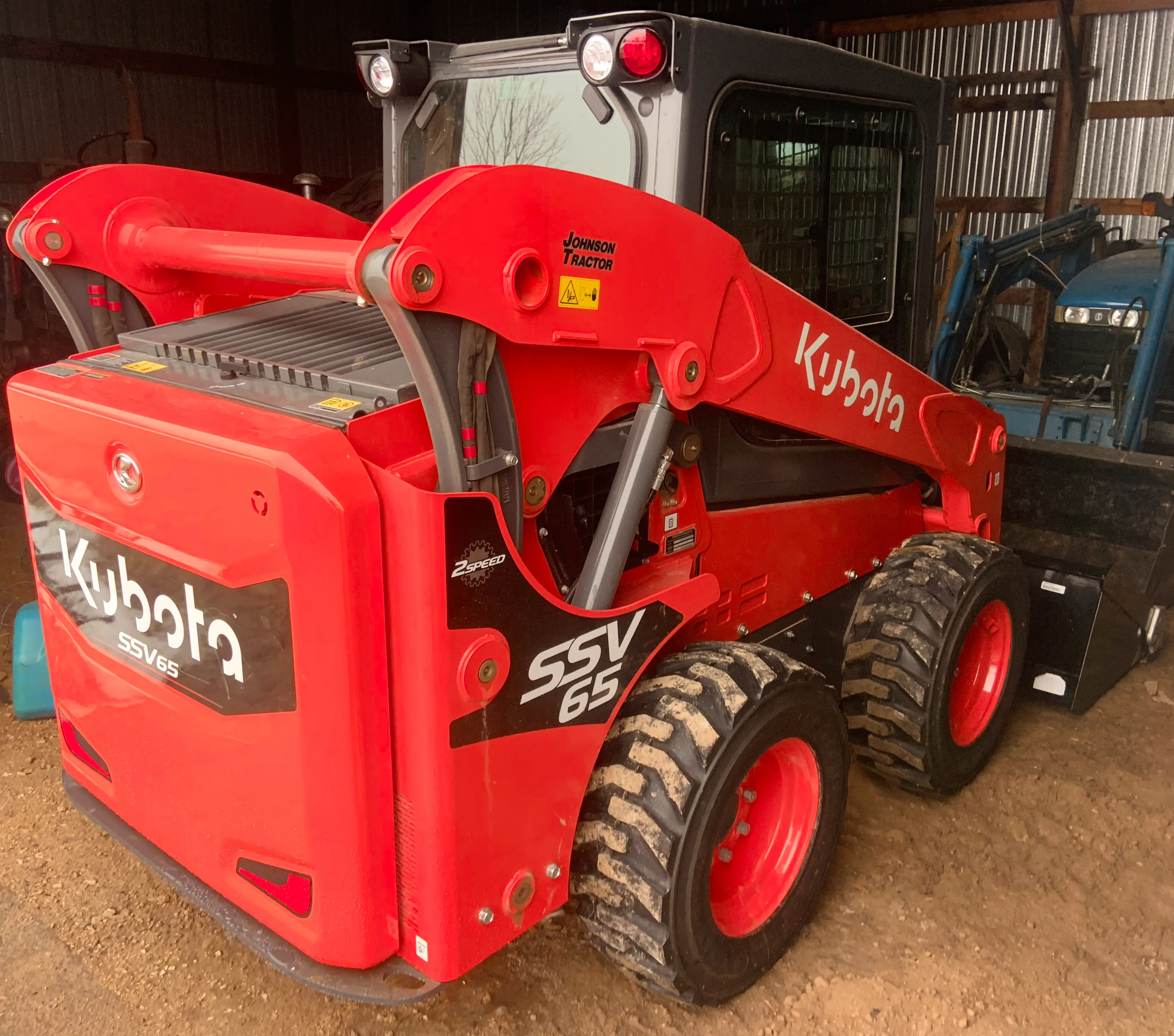
Kubota skid steer

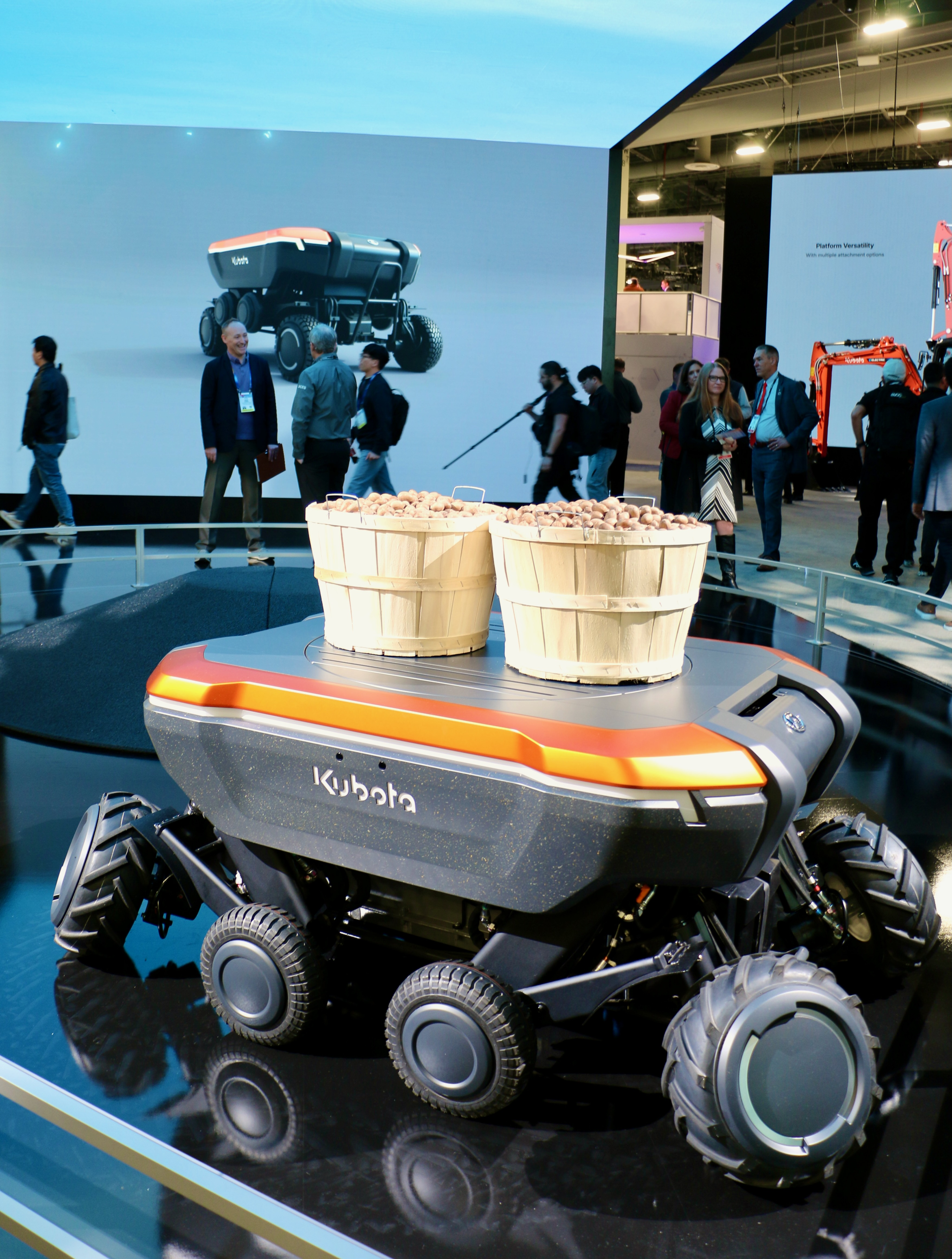
All-terrain KATR, CES 2025
