= Electric tractor =

Tractor powered by electricity

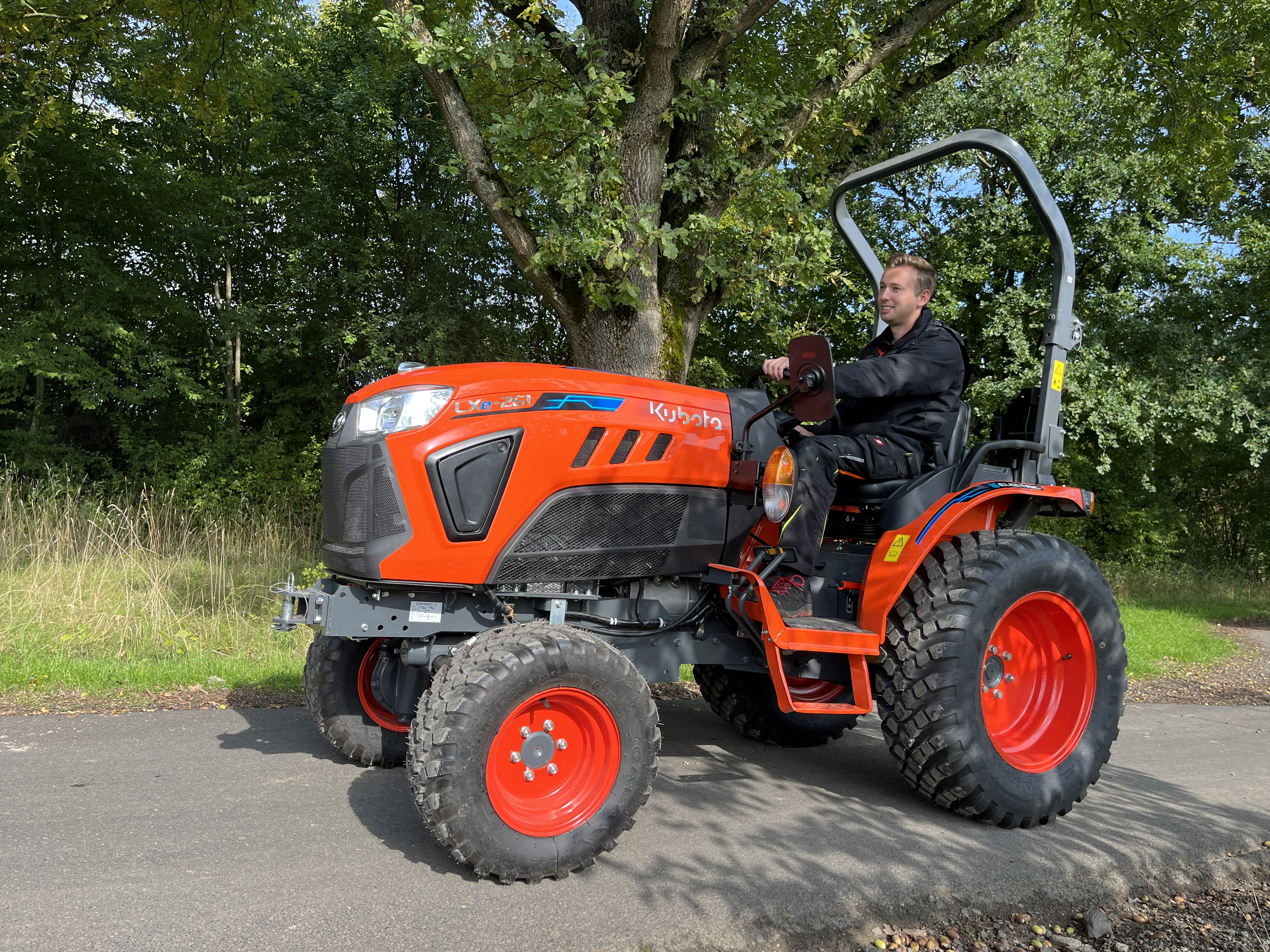
Kubota LXe electric tractor

Electric tractors are tractors powered by electric vehicle batteries (sometimes called Battery Electric Tractors or BET), or in the case of plug-ins, by an electric power cable.

== Advantages ==
Electric tractors offer several advantages over diesel tractors. An electric motor needs less maintenance than a diesel engine, which has hundreds of moving parts. Electric motors produce maximum torque instantaneously, reducing the need for a transmission to match speed with torque. However, many electric tractors still need a transmission to allow variable ground speeds while maintaining a constant speed for power take-off (PTO). They can be powered by household electricity, offering cost savings over diesel fuel. Greenhouse gas emissions, estimated at 53 tons per year for a typical diesel tractor, are drastically reduced. Additionally, electric tractors require less periodic maintenance as they do not contain engine oil. A significant downside to electric tractors is the time it takes to recharge the battery compared to refueling with diesel.

== Manufacturers ==
Electric tractors are manufactured by a German company, Fendt, and by US companies, Solectrac and Monarch Tractor.

John Deere's prototype electric tractor is a plug-in, powered by an electrical cable.

Kubota produces the LXe line of compact electric tractors and is prototyping an autonomous electric tractor.

New Holland launched their T4 Electric Power Tractor, first showcased in 2023.

CaseIH announced their Farmall Utility 75C electric tractor.

== See also ==
- Climate-smart agriculture
- Greenhouse gas emissions from agriculture
