= King of the Ring (1999) =

World Wrestling Federation pay-per-view event

- Promotional poster featuring The Big Show
- Promotion: World Wrestling Federation
- Date: June 27, 1999
- City: Greensboro, North Carolina
- Venue: Greensboro Coliseum
- Attendance: 20,108
- Buy rate: 406,000
- Tagline: Reliving the War

Pay-per-view chronology
← Previous; Over the Edge	Next → Fully Loaded

King of the Ring event chronology
← Previous; 1998	Next → 2000

King of the Ring tournament chronology
← Previous; 1998	Next → 2000

The 1999 King of the Ring was a professional wrestling pay-per-view (PPV) event produced by the World Wrestling Federation (WWF, renamed WWE in 2002). It was the seventh annual King of the Ring event and hosted the finals of the 13th King of the Ring tournament for men. It took place on June 27, 1999, at the Greensboro Coliseum in Greensboro, North Carolina.

The main show included 10 matches in total with several matches preceding the pay-per-view portion of the show, broadcast on live television as part of the WWF's Sunday Night Heat pre-show as well as one dark match. The main event was a Ladder match featuring Shane McMahon and Vince McMahon defeating "Stone Cold" Steve Austin for control of the WWF. The other main match was a WWF Championship match where The Undertaker defeated The Rock to retain the title. Additional featured matches on the undercard included the 1999 King of the Ring tournament final where Billy Gunn defeated X-Pac to become the "King of the Ring". Another prominent match was a tag team match in which The Hardy Boyz (Jeff Hardy and Matt Hardy) defeating The Brood (Edge and Christian).

== Production ==
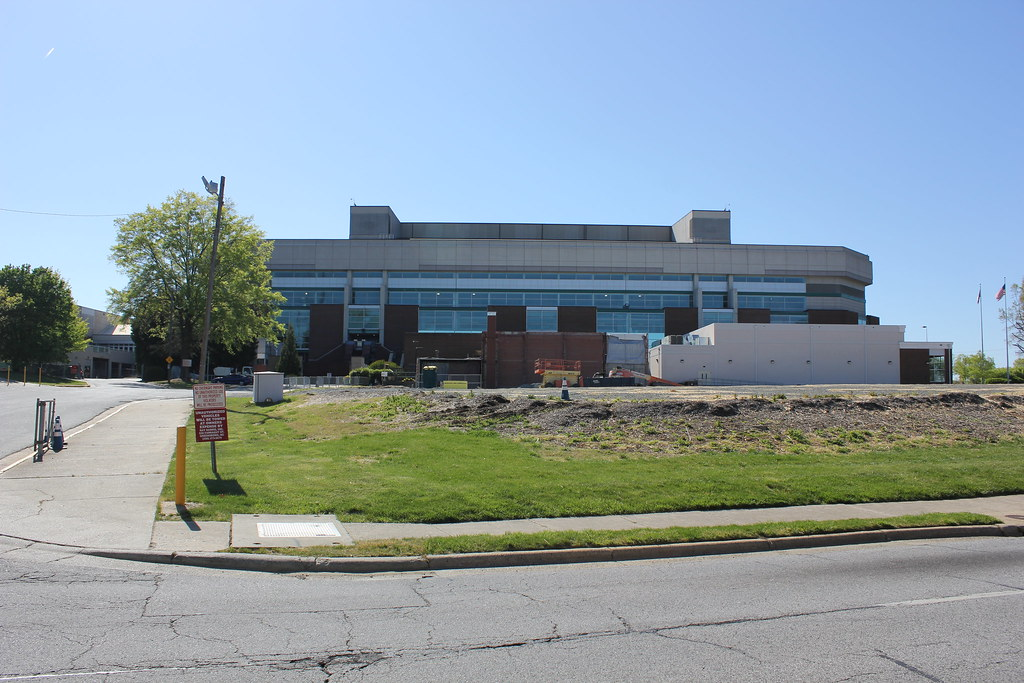
The seventh annual King of the Ring event was held at the Greensboro Coliseum in Greensboro, North Carolina.

=== Background ===
King of the Ring was a professional wrestling pay-per-view (PPV) event held annually in June by the World Wrestling Federation (WWF, renamed WWE in 2002) since 1993. The PPV was named after the King of the Ring tournament, a men's single-elimination tournament that was established in 1985 and held annually until 1991, except for 1990, with the winner crowned the "King of the Ring"; these early tournaments were held as special non-televised house shows. The King of the Ring event became considered as one of the WWF's "Big Five" PPVs, along with the Royal Rumble, WrestleMania, SummerSlam, and Survivor Series, the company's five biggest annual shows of the year. The seventh King of the Ring event was scheduled to be held on June 27, 1999, at the Greensboro Coliseum in Greensboro, North Carolina and it hosted the finals of the 13th tournament.

Unlike the non-televised events, the PPV did not feature all of the tournament's matches. Instead, several of the qualifying matches preceded the event with the final few matches then taking place at the PPV. Other matches took place at the event as it was a traditional three-hour PPV.

=== Storylines ===
Other on-screen personnel
Role:	Name:
English commentators	Jim Ross
English commentators	Jerry Lawler
Spanish commentators	Carlos Cabrera
Spanish commentators	Hugo Savinovich
Interviewer	Michael Cole
Interviewer	Kevin Kelly
Interviewer	Terry Taylor
Ring announcer	Howard Finkel
Referees	Mike Chioda
Referees	Earl Hebner
Referees	Theodore Long
Referees	Tim White
Referees	Jimmy Korderas

The event featured a total of 15 professional wrestling matches, which compromised one dark match, four shown during the Sunday Night Heat pre-show, and the remaining 10 matches broadcast live on the PPV.

The main feud heading into King of the Ring was between "Stone Cold" Steve Austin and The McMahons (Vince McMahon and Shane McMahon) in a handicap ladder match. The storyline began at WrestleMania XV, when Austin won the WWF Championship from The Rock. The following months, Vince and Shane had been feuding with each other when Shane took control of The Corporation and later revealed that he was the mastermind behind his sister Stephanie McMahon's abduction at the hands of The Undertaker and his Ministry of Darkness. At the time, Shane and Undertaker joined forces to form the Corporate Ministry. The previous month at Over the Edge, Austin lost the WWF Championship to Undertaker after Shane, who served as a special guest referee, made a quick three count to ensure Undertaker the victory.

Three weeks later, it was revealed that the Corporate Ministry served a "greater power" whom they were taking orders from behind the scenes. After Undertaker and Austin's title match ended in a no contest, the Ministry dropped to their knees in the ring and the greater power emerged from the back and revealed himself to Austin, who was tied up in the ring ropes. The following week, the greater power was revealed as Vince McMahon, who explained that his face turn was a plot to screw Austin out of the WWF Championship. Linda and Stephanie appeared on the stage and Stephanie berated Vince and Shane for using her to get to Austin. Linda then announced that she had stepped down as the chief executive officer of the WWF and had hand-picked her successor, which was revealed to be Austin, who announced that he would be facing the McMahons in a handicap match at King of the Ring. A week later, after Austin dumped cow manure into Vince's office at the WWF headquarters, Vince announced the match would be a ladder match with 100% ownership of the WWF in a briefcase hanging high above the ring. The following week, Austin defeated Big Boss Man in a singles match to ensure there would be no interference from the Corporate Ministry.

The secondary feud heading into King of the Ring was between The Undertaker and The Rock over the WWF Championship. The feud started on the June 7th episode of Raw is War, when Rock faced Triple H in a cast match. As Rock was preparing to drop the People's Elbow on Triple H, Undertaker interfered and dropped Rock with a Tombstone Piledriver on a steel chair. The Big Show made the save chasing away Undertaker. The following week, Rock came out and challenged Undertaker to a title match at King of the Ring. Undertaker accepted the challenge but the McMahons came out and told Rock that he must defeat Undertaker in a non-title match to earn his title shot. Later that night, Shane was about to announce the stipulation for the match between Undertaker and Rock, but was attacked by Ken Shamrock. When the match got underway though, Triple H came out and announced that the stipulation was that Rock would have to take on both him and Undertaker in a Triple Threat match which Rock won after Chyna accidentally tripped Undertaker during the match. The following week, Rock defeated Edge in singles action. After the match, Undertaker came out and once again dropped Rock with a Tombstone Piledriver. Later that night, Undertaker defended his WWF Championship against Triple H. The match ended in a disqualification when Rock interfered and dropped Undertaker with a Rock Bottom. When a large Brahma Bull symbol (similar to the Undertaker symbol) descended from the rafters, Rock attempted to tie Undertaker to the symbol but Undertaker was saved by his allies in the Corporate Ministry. Paul Bearer was tied to the symbol instead.

Triple H was originally supposed to compete in the King of the Ring tournament, but he wanted to compete for the WWF Championship instead, so he gave his spot to Chyna, making her the first and only woman to ever compete in the tournament.

== King of the Ring tournament bracket ==
The tournament took place between May 30 and June 27, 1999. The tournament brackets were:

First round (TV)
Billy Gunn	Pin
Viscera	2:05
Ken Shamrock	Sub
Jeff Jarrett	2:55
Droz	Pin
Big Show	0:59
Test	Pin
Kane	3:05
Road Dogg	Pin
The Godfather	1:02
Chyna	Pin
Val Venis	2:14
Al Snow	Pin
Hardcore Holly	1:24
Big Boss Man	Pin
X-Pac	2:37

Quarterfinals (PPV)
Billy Gunn	Ref Stop
Ken Shamrock	3:37
Big Show	Pin
Kane	6:36
Road Dogg	Pin
Chyna	13:19
Hardcore Holly	DQ
X-Pac	3:02

Semifinals (PPV)
Billy Gunn	Pin
Kane	5:25
Road Dogg	Pin
X-Pac	3:08

Final (PPV)
Billy Gunn	Pin
X-Pac	5:33

== Reception ==
In 2018, Kevin Pantoja of 411Mania gave the event a rating of 1.5 [Extremely Horrendous], stating, "Because of how bad the 1995 King of the Ring was, people seem to overlook [how] bad this show was. Only three matches cracked two stars and they barely did so. The tournament itself felt like a major afterthought and not one of those matches was any good at all. Add in the questionable booking and the fact that nothing on this show ended up mattering, and you’ve got a recipe for one of the worst Pay-Per-Views in history. Terrible."

== Aftermath ==
With Austin defeated and the McMahons back in control of the WWF, Shane fired Austin as CEO on Raw the night after King of the Ring. Vince announced that Austin would be placed at the “bottom of the ladder”, where he would stay far away from contendership for any title. He even went as far as demoting Austin to ring crew duties, declaring he would be assisting in the disassembly of the wrestling ring after the show.

Austin then came out and revealed he had a surprise for the Corporate Ministry. First, while he was still CEO, Austin told the McMahons that he drew up a new contract for himself that not only gave him a raise but enabled him to assault McMahon whenever and wherever he so desired. Then, Austin said that before he took to the ring for the ladder match, he booked a WWF Championship match with Undertaker defending against him in the main event, and any outside interference by anyone at all would result in Austin winning the title. Austin would go on to defeat Undertaker after hitting him with a Stone Cold Stunner and regained the championship he had lost at Over the Edge.

After Triple H interfered in Undertaker and The Rock's WWF Championship match and cost Rock the title, another feud developed between them. On Raw the next night, Triple H and Chyna came to the ring during Billy Gunn's interview about his victory in the King of the Ring Tournament. Triple H stated to Gunn that since he is focused on a WWF Championship title shot, he was offering to lend Chyna to Gunn so they would challenge the two remaining members of D-Generation X (Road Dogg and X-Pac) to a match so they would take it over and have all the royalties to the group. When Gunn accepted the offer, Rock ran to the ring and attacked Gunn and Triple H. While Rock and Triple H brawled, WWF officials separated the two. This led to a Strap Match at Fully Loaded between Rock and Triple H with the winner facing the WWF Champion at SummerSlam in August.

== Results ==
No.	Results	Stipulations	Times
1^{D}	Meat (with Jacqueline and Terri Runnels) defeated Kurt Angle	Singles match	—
2^{H}	The Brood (Christian and Edge) (with Gangrel) vs. The Hardy Boyz (Jeff Hardy and Matt Hardy) (with Michael Hayes) ended in a no contest	Tag team match to determine #1 contenders to the WWF Tag Team Championship	1:28
3^{H}	The Corporate Ministry (Mideon and Viscera) defeated Big Boss Man	2-on-1 Handicap match	1:47
4^{H}	Prince Albert (with Droz) defeated Val Venis	Singles match	1:57
5^{H}	Ken Shamrock defeated Shane McMahon by disqualification	Singles match	0:47
6	X-Pac defeated Hardcore Holly by disqualification	King of the Ring quarter-final match	3:02
7	Kane defeated Big Show	King of the Ring quarter-final match	6:36
8	Billy Gunn defeated Ken Shamrock by referee stoppage	King of the Ring quarter-final match	3:37
9	Road Dogg defeated Chyna (with Triple H)	King of the Ring quarter-final match	13:21
10	The Hardy Boyz (Jeff Hardy and Matt Hardy) (with Michael Hayes) defeated The Brood (Christian and Edge) (with Gangrel)	Tag team match to determine #1 contenders to the WWF Tag Team Championship	4:49
11	Billy Gunn defeated Kane	King of the Ring semi-final match	5:25
12	X-Pac defeated Road Dogg	King of the Ring semi-final match	3:08
13	The Undertaker (c) (with Paul Bearer) defeated The Rock	Singles match for the WWF Championship	19:11
14	Billy Gunn defeated X-Pac	King of the Ring final match	5:33
15	Vince McMahon and Shane McMahon defeated "Stone Cold" Steve Austin	2-on-1 Handicap ladder match for full control of the World Wrestling Federation	17:13
(c) / – the champion(s) heading into the match; D / – this was a dark match; H / – the match was broadcast prior to the pay-per-view on Sunday Night Heat
