= Ideanomics =

Bankrupt mobility technology company

Ideanomics, Inc.
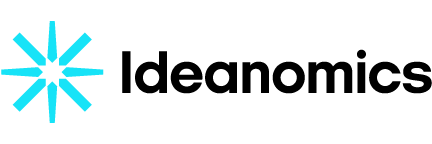
- Formerly: China Broadband, Inc. (2004–2011); You On Demand Holdings, Inc. (2011–2017); Wecast Network, Inc. (2017); Seven Stars Cloud Group, Inc. (2017–2018)
- Type: Public
- Traded as: OTC Pink: IDEXQ
- Industry: Electric vehicles Financial technology
- Founded: October 19, 2004; 21 years ago in Nevada, United States
- Fate: Chapter 11 filed December 4, 2024; Assets sold in March 2025; Liquidation plan effective February 13, 2026
- Headquarters: New York City, United States
- Key people: Alf Poor (former CEO)
- Products: Electric commercial vehicles Electric tractors Wireless EV charging systems Electric motorcycles
- Services: Fleet electrification Vehicle procurement and financing Charging infrastructure Energy management
- Subsidiaries: VIA Motors; Solectrac; Wireless Advanced Vehicle Electrification (WAVE); US Hybrid; Energica
- Website: ideanomics.com

Ideanomics, Inc. was an American electric vehicle and clean mobility technology company based in New York City. Its subsidiaries included VIA Motors, Solectrac, Wireless Advanced Vehicle Electrification (WAVE), US Hybrid, and Energica.

On December 4, 2024, Ideanomics and eight of its affiliates filed for Chapter 11 protection in the United States Bankruptcy Court for the District of Delaware, with plans to sell substantially all of its assets. The sale to Tillou Management and Consulting LLC, an entity controlled by the family of former WWE executive Vince McMahon, was completed in March 2025. The company's Chapter 11 plan of liquidation, filed under the successor name IDEX Wind Down, Inc., became effective on February 13, 2026.

== History ==
=== Early history (2004–2020) ===
Ideanomics was incorporated in the U.S. state of Nevada on October 19, 2004, as China Broadband, Inc., initially providing broadband internet access services in the People's Republic of China. In August 2010, Shane McMahon, the son of WWE co-founder Vince McMahon, was appointed CEO of China Broadband. In 2011, it was renamed as You On Demand Holdings, Inc. and changed its business focus on premium content video on demand (VOD) services in China under the "You-on-Demand" brand.

In 2017, You On Demand was renamed as Wecast Network, Inc. and then, later that year, to Seven Stars Cloud Group, Inc., to focus on a financial technology business model that included trading of petroleum products and electronic components. Zheng Wu became chairman of the board in January 2016 and served as CEO from October 2017 to November 2018.

In October 2018, Ideanomics acquired the former University of Connecticut West Hartford campus for US$5.2 million, announcing plans to relocate certain operations to the site.

=== Pivot to electric vehicles and acquisitions (2020–2023) ===
In 2020, Ideanomics moved its headquarters to Midtown Manhattan and shifted its focus toward the commercial electric vehicle. In October 2020, Ideanomics acquired a 15% stake in California-based Solectrac, a manufacturer of all-electric tractors, for US$1.3 million, and later acquired full ownership by June 2021 for a total of approximately US$25 million.

In January 2021, Ideanomics acquired Salt Lake City-based Wireless Advanced Vehicle Electrification (WAVE). In June 2021, Ideanomics completed its acquisition of Torrance, California-based US Hybrid, a manufacturer of electric powertrain components and fuel cell engines for medium- and heavy-duty commercial fleet applications, for an aggregate purchase price of US$50 million. In August 2021, Ideanomics acquired VIA Motors, a Orem, Utah-based commercial electric vehicle manufacturer, for US$630 million.

In March 2022, Ideanomics finalized the acquisition of a 70% stake in Italian high-performance electric motorcycle manufacturer Energica Motor Company through a tender offer at €3.20 per share, following the securing of 93.63% of Energica's public float on March 7, 2022.

=== SEC settlement, Nasdaq delisting, and bankruptcy (2023–2026) ===
Amid its financial deterioration, Ideanomics conducted a 1-for-125 reverse stock split in August 2023 in an attempt to comply with Nasdaq's minimum bid price requirement. On April 19, 2024, and again on May 21 and June 26, 2024, Nasdaq issued additional delisting determinations against the company for failure to meet listing rules, including timely filing of periodic reports and minimum stockholders' equity requirements. Trading of the company's securities was suspended on July 11, 2024, and formally delisted effective September 16, 2024.

On August 9, 2024, the U.S. Securities and Exchange Commission announced settled fraud charges against Ideanomics, its former chairman and CEO Bruno Wu, current CEO Alfred Poor, and former CFO Federico Tovar for misleading investors about the company's financial performance between 2017 and 2019. The SEC found that in November 2017, Ideanomics and Wu had reported revenue guidance of US$300 million despite known indications that it would fall short by a wide margin, the company later reported only US$144 million in 2017 revenues. The SEC also alleged that Wu had misled the company's auditor with a fraudulent letter of intent to avoid a US$17 million asset writedown, hidden his personal interests in two entities that received millions from Ideanomics, and improperly accounted for a cryptocurrency transaction that overstated 2019 revenues by more than US$40 million. Ideanomics agreed to a US$1.4 million penalty, Wu paid US$3.3 million in disgorgement and a US$200,000 penalty and agreed to a 10-year officer and director bar, and Poor and Tovar each paid US$75,000 penalties.

In July 2024, WiTricity filed a patent-infringement suit against Ideanomics subsidiary WAVE Charging over wireless-charging technology. Separately, WAVE brought claims against WiTricity alleging trade-secret misappropriation. After the initial Delaware suit was dismissed in September 2024, WiTricity refiled in the District of Utah; the case ultimately concluded with a joint stipulated dismissal on April 11, 2025.

On December 4, 2024, Ideanomics and eight of its affiliates filed for Chapter 11 protection in the United States Bankruptcy Court for the District of Delaware, listing assets of between US$50 million and US$100 million and liabilities of between US$100 million and US$500 million. According to court filings, the company had lost more than US$800 million over the preceding five years and entered bankruptcy with just US$189,000 in cash on hand. Ideanomics secured a US$30.4 million debtor-in-possession loan from Tillou Management and Consulting LLC, an entity controlled by the family office of former WWE executive Vince McMahon. Tillou served as the stalking horse bidder and, in the absence of higher qualifying bids, acquired substantially all of the remaining assets, principally the WAVE Charging business. In January 2025, Bloomberg News reported that Morgan Stanley asserted a $10 million transaction fee claim in the bankruptcy case.

The sale closed on March 7, 2025, following which Shane McMahon resigned as director and executive chairman and CFO Ryan Jenkins was terminated. A Delaware bankruptcy judge approved the company's amended Chapter 11 plan of liquidation in January 2026, and the plan became effective on February 13, 2026, under the successor name IDEX Wind Down, Inc.

== See also ==
- Electric vehicle industry
- Wireless power transfer
