= Acquisition of WWE by Endeavor =

2023 merger between WWE and UFC

- Initiator: Endeavor
- Target: WWE
- Type: Full acquisition
- Cost: US$9.3 billion
- Initiated: April 3, 2023
- Completed: September 12, 2023

The acquisition of WWE by Endeavor began on April 3, 2023, when Endeavor Group Holdings, owner of Zuffa, the parent company of the Ultimate Fighting Championship (UFC) mixed martial arts promotion, announced it would acquire WWE, the world's largest professional wrestling promotion. The deal, estimated to be worth US$9.3 billion, will merge the two promotions into a new company. However, both WWE and the UFC will continue to operate as separate divisions of the new company. The merger closed on September 12, 2023, with the formation of the new TKO Group Holdings (TKO) company. After the close of the merger, all Zuffa and WWE assets were transferred to a TKO subsidiary named TKO Operating Company, LLC (TKO OpCo).

== Background ==
=== Ultimate Fighting Championship ===
The Ultimate Fighting Championship (UFC) is a mixed martial arts promotion founded by businessman Art Davie and martial artist Rorion Gracie in 1993. In 2001, the UFC—then deemed a failing company—was acquired by Station Casinos executives Frank and Lorenzo Fertitta from Semaphore Entertainment Group for US$2 million. Around this period, Shane McMahon, son of WWE owner Vince McMahon, had attempted to purchase the UFC multiple times, but Vince talked him out of doing so. Following the purchase, the Fertittas created the company Zuffa to manage the business, and installed Dana White as president. In May 2016, ESPN reported that several companies, including WME-IMG, were in talks to acquire the UFC. White refuted these claims, telling the Las Vegas Review-Journal that "the UFC is not for sale". ESPN estimated that the UFC was valued between US$3.5 billion to US$4 billion at the time.

In July 2016, WME-IMG gained a controlling share of the UFC for US$4 billion. Backed by investment firms Silver Lake Partners, Kohlberg Kravis Roberts, and MSD Capital, it was the largest-ever acquisition in sports at that point. The Abu Dhabi government retained its 10% stake in the company. In October 2017, WME-IMG announced it had formed a new company known as Endeavor and moved its assets to the nascent company. CEO Ari Emanuel and chairman Patrick Whitesell retained their positions.

In April 2021, Endeavor launched an initial public offering and became a publicly traded company on the New York Stock Exchange. Endeavor subsequently acquired the UFC as a whole.

=== WWE ===
WWE is a professional wrestling promotion, originating from the Capitol Wrestling Corporation (CWC) of the 1950s, run by Vincent J. McMahon, son of boxing promoter Jess McMahon. CWC's successor, the World Wide Wrestling Federation (WWWF), was formed by Vincent J. McMahon in 1963 after he pulled CWC out of the National Wrestling Alliance (NWA) in protest of Buddy Rogers losing the NWA World Heavyweight Championship to Lou Thesz. McMahon assumed full control of the company in 1971 following the departure of business partner and wrestler Toots Mondt. In March 1979, the WWWF was renamed to World Wrestling Federation (WWF), and in May 2002, it was renamed to World Wrestling Entertainment (WWE); since April 2011, the company has branded itself solely under the trade name of WWE. Following the acquisition of CWC, the holding company for the WWF, in 1982 by Vince McMahon, Vincent's son, Vince and other members of the McMahon family have held significant interest within WWE.

On June 17, 2022, amid allegations that he paid hush money to a former employee, McMahon stepped down as the chairman and CEO of WWE, leaving the company to his daughter, Stephanie McMahon, and Nick Khan. McMahon returned to the board in January 2023 ahead of media negotiation rights with Fox Broadcasting Company and USA Network. Reports later emerged that McMahon returned to seek a potential buyer for the WWE, hiring financial services firm JPMorgan Chase. Among the suitors involved in a potential acquisition included Endeavor.

== Acquisition and aftermath ==
On April 2, 2023, on the final day of WrestleMania 39, CNBC reported that Endeavor (who were among many bidders to buy WWE) and WWE were in talks for the former to acquire the latter. Endeavor CEO Ari Emanuel confirmed the deal the following day on April 3, announcing that the UFC and WWE would be merging into one company.

As part of the acquisition, Endeavor will hold a 51% stake in the new company—tentatively referred to as "NewCo." and tentatively planned to trade under the symbol "TKO"—with WWE's shareholders having a 49% stake. This will mark the first time that WWE has not been majority-controlled by a member of the McMahon family.

McMahon will serve as executive chairman of the new entity, Endeavor CEO Ari Emanuel becoming CEO, with Mark Shapiro as president and chief operating officer. Emanuel will not take on any creative roles, with Nick Khan becoming president of WWE post-merger (not unlike Dana White's role as president of UFC). In an interview with CNBC, McMahon stated that he would be involved in creative "on a higher level", but would not be "in the weeds" as he was in the past.

Emanuel stated that this merger would "bring together two leading pureplay sports and entertainment companies" and provide "significant operating synergies". McMahon stated that "family businesses have to evolve for all the right reasons", and that "given the incredible work that Ari and Endeavor have done to grow the UFC brand — nearly doubling its revenue over the past seven years — and the immense success we've already had in partnering with their team on a number of ventures, I believe that this is without a doubt the best outcome for our shareholders and other stakeholders." The merger is expected to be completed in the second half of 2023.

Despite the merger, the two promotions, WWE and the UFC, will continue to run as separate divisions of the newly merged company as per statements made by WWE CEO Nick Khan. The merger closed on September 12, 2023, with the formation of the new TKO Group Holdings (TKO) company. The first television show produced under the TKO banner was the September 12 episode of WWE NXT.

In January 2024, five months after the formation of TKO, a lawsuit was filed by Janel Grant, a former employee at WWE headquarters between 2019 and 2022 against WWE as well as TKO (by proxy of ownership). Grant alleged that the then WWE head Vince McMahon, had coerced her into a sexual relationship, and, along with WWE executive John Laurinaitis and an unnamed WWE wrestler who was also a former UFC fighter (later identified as Brock Lesnar), sexually trafficked her and repeatedly sexually assaulted her between 2020–2021. Grant alleged that she was subjected to "extreme cruelty and degradation" by McMahon, including being defecated upon during a sexual encounter. Grant stated that McMahon had agreed to pay her $3 million in 2022 in return for a NDA but stopped paying after only $1 million had been paid following the initial public emergence of the sexual misconduct allegations the same year. On January 26, 2024, Vince McMahon resigned from TKO. In a statement, McMahon said the decision was made "out of respect for the WWE Universe, the extraordinary TKO business and its board members and shareholders, partners and constituents, and all of the employees".

== Criticism ==
Hours after the sale, law firm Ademi LLP launched an investigation into the sale, looking for "possible breaches of fiduciary duty and other violations of law". WWE's stock price additionally decreased following the announcement of the sale.
