= WrestleMania 39 =

2023 WWE premium live event

- Promotional poster featuring Roman Reigns, Cody Rhodes, various WWE wrestlers, and Snoop Dogg
- Promotion: WWE
- Brands: Raw; SmackDown
- Date: April 1–2, 2023 (Note: This event was originally set to be held as a one-night event on April 2, 2023, before changing into a two-night event.)
- City: Inglewood, California
- Venue: SoFi Stadium
- Attendance: Night 1: 67,303; Night 2: 67,553; Combined: 134,856
- Tagline: "WrestleMania Goes Hollywood"

WWE event chronology
← Previous; NXT Stand & Deliver	Next → Backlash

WrestleMania chronology
← Previous; 38	Next → XL

WrestleMania 39, also promoted as WrestleMania Goes Hollywood, was a 2023 two-part professional wrestling premium live event (PLE) produced by WWE, held for wrestlers from the promotion's main roster brands, Raw and SmackDown. It was the 39th annual WrestleMania and took place as a two-night event on Saturday, April 1 and Sunday, April 2, 2023, at SoFi Stadium in the Greater Los Angeles city of Inglewood, California. WWE wrestler The Miz and rapper Snoop Dogg served as the hosts for the event.

This was the sixth WrestleMania to be held in Greater Los Angeles, after 2, VII, XII, 2000, and 21, and the seventh in the U.S. state of California overall, including 31, which was held in the San Francisco Bay Area. The event was held at the originally planned location and venue for WrestleMania 37 before the COVID-19 pandemic forced it to be relocated to Tampa, Florida; WrestleMania 39 in turn adopted the Hollywood theme originally intended for that event. This was also the first WrestleMania to livestream on Disney+ in the Philippines and Binge in Australia. This would subsequently be the final WrestleMania in which WWE was owned and controlled by the McMahon family as on April 3, the day after the event, it was confirmed that the company had been sold to Endeavor. The sale was finalized on September 12, with WWE merging with Ultimate Fighting Championship to become divisions of TKO Group Holdings.

The card comprised a total of 15 matches, with eight on Night 1 and seven on Night 2. In the main event for Night 1, Kevin Owens and Sami Zayn defeated The Usos (Jey Uso and Jimmy Uso) to win the Undisputed WWE Tag Team Championship, ending the latter's record-setting male tag team title reign at 622 days. (Note: Specifically, The Usos's (Jey Uso and Jimmy Uso) record was with the SmackDown Tag Team Championship.) This was also the first time a tag team championship match was the main event of a WrestleMania, and only the second time a tag team match in general was the main event, after WrestleMania I in March 1985. In other prominent matches, Seth Rollins defeated Logan Paul, Rey Mysterio defeated his son Dominik Mysterio, Rhea Ripley defeated Charlotte Flair to win the SmackDown Women's Championship, and in the opening bout, Austin Theory defeated John Cena to retain Raw's United States Championship. The event also included the in-ring return of Pat McAfee, who wrestled his first match since the 2022 SummerSlam, as well as the in-ring WWE debut of Snoop Dogg, who both defeated The Miz in impromptu matches, with the latter occurring on Night 2.

In the main event for Night 2, Roman Reigns defeated Cody Rhodes to retain the Undisputed WWE Universal Championship. This subsequently made Reigns the second wrestler after Hulk Hogan to enter three consecutive WrestleManias as world champion during the same reign but it made him the only wrestler to defend a world championship at each. (Note: Specifically, Roman Reigns's three consecutive defenses were with SmackDown's Universal Championship.) In other prominent matches, Edge defeated "The Demon" Finn Bálor in a Hell in a Cell match, Gunther defeated Sheamus and Drew McIntyre in a triple threat match to retain SmackDown's Intercontinental Championship, Bianca Belair defeated Asuka to retain the Raw Women's Championship, and in the opening bout, Brock Lesnar defeated Omos. Night 2 was also notable for the return of Shane McMahon, who last appeared at the 2022 Royal Rumble.

The event received generally positive reviews from critics; the Undisputed WWE Tag Team Championship, the Intercontinental Championship, and the SmackDown Women's Championship matches were singled out as highlights throughout the entire event, with the former two rated five stars by Dave Meltzer. Although noting the event's repetitiveness, critics also praised the Men's WrestleMania Showcase fatal four-way tag team match, Logan Paul vs. Seth Rollins, Rey vs. Dominik Mysterio, and the Hell in a Cell match. WWE's use of Auschwitz footage in a staged video promoting the Mysterio match drew criticism for exploiting genuine historic footage, leading WWE to apologize and state its inclusion was due to an editing error. At the time, the decision to have Reigns defeat Rhodes was met with severe, widespread criticism from fans and wrestling analysts, though it was received more positively in retrospect after WrestleMania XL.

== Production ==
=== Background ===
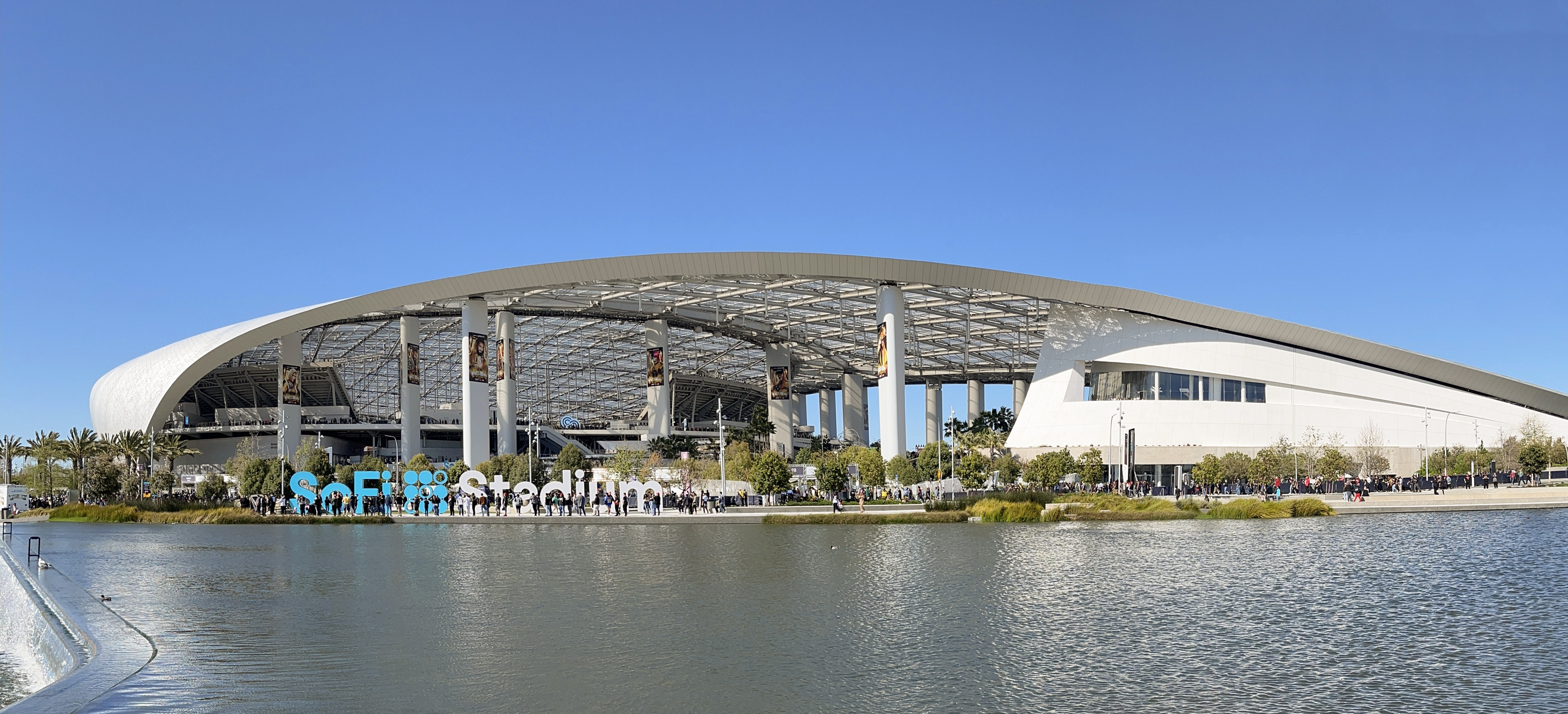
The 39th annual WrestleMania was held at SoFi Stadium in Inglewood, California.

WrestleMania is WWE's flagship professional wrestling premium live event (PLE), having first been held in 1985. It was the company's first pay-per-view (PPV) produced and was also WWE's first major event available via livestreaming when the company launched the WWE Network in February 2014. It is the longest-running professional wrestling event in history and is held annually between mid-March to mid-April. It was the first of WWE's original four PPVs, including Royal Rumble, SummerSlam, and Survivor Series, referred to as the "Big Four", and as of August 2021, it is considered one of the "Big Five", along with Money in the Bank. WrestleMania was ranked the sixth most valuable sports brand in the world by Forbes in 2019, and has been described as the Super Bowl of sports entertainment. Much like the Super Bowl, cities bid for the right to host the year's edition of WrestleMania.

On February 10, 2020, WWE announced that SoFi Stadium in Inglewood, California would host WrestleMania 37 on Sunday, March 28, 2021, with the event being promoted as "WrestleMania Hollywood". Wrestling journalist Dave Meltzer reported that WWE had originally pushed for SoFi Stadium to host WrestleMania in 2022, so it could promote the event as having a larger overall attendance than Super Bowl LVI, which was held at the same venue in February of that year. However, Inglewood city officials preferred that WrestleMania be held in 2021 to prepare for Super Bowl LVI.

In the midst of the COVID-19 pandemic in October 2020, however, the Wrestling Observer Newsletter reported that WWE was considering relocating WrestleMania 37, as the state of the pandemic in California made it increasingly unlikely that the event could be held with in-person spectators on the scheduled date. WWE had reportedly planned to relocate the event to Raymond James Stadium in Tampa, Florida, which was originally scheduled to host WrestleMania 36 before the onset of the pandemic forced it to be scaled back and instead be held at the WWE Performance Center in Orlando, Florida. In late-September 2020, Florida governor Ron DeSantis lifted all mandatory capacity restrictions in the state, although sports teams continued to voluntarily impose capacity restrictions based on federal guidance. California allowed outdoor stadiums to re-open to in-state visitors only beginning April 1, 2021, with capacity restricted based on case positivity in individual regions.

On January 16, 2021, WWE officially announced that WrestleMania 37 had been relocated to Tampa, and that Inglewood would instead host WrestleMania 39 in 2023, with the aforementioned "Hollywood"-themed branding being carried over. In turn, WrestleMania 39 was the first since WrestleMania 21 to be held in Greater Los Angeles, and the seventh held in the U.S. state of California, after 2, VII, XII, 2000, 21, and 31. The event was originally announced to be held solely on Sunday, April 2, 2023, but during WrestleMania 38, it was revealed that like the previous three WrestleMania events, WrestleMania 39 was expanded to a two-night event, scheduled for Saturday, April 1, and Sunday, April 2, and it featured wrestlers from the Raw and SmackDown brand divisions. WrestleMania 39 was also the first to be held in an official Olympic Stadium as Sofi Stadium is one of the two main venues for the 2028 Summer Olympics in Los Angeles, and the third since the Pontiac Silverdome (WrestleMania III) and the AT&T Stadium (32 and 38) to be hosted in a FIFA World Cup venue as it is also one the stadiums to host matches for the 2026 edition of the tournament.

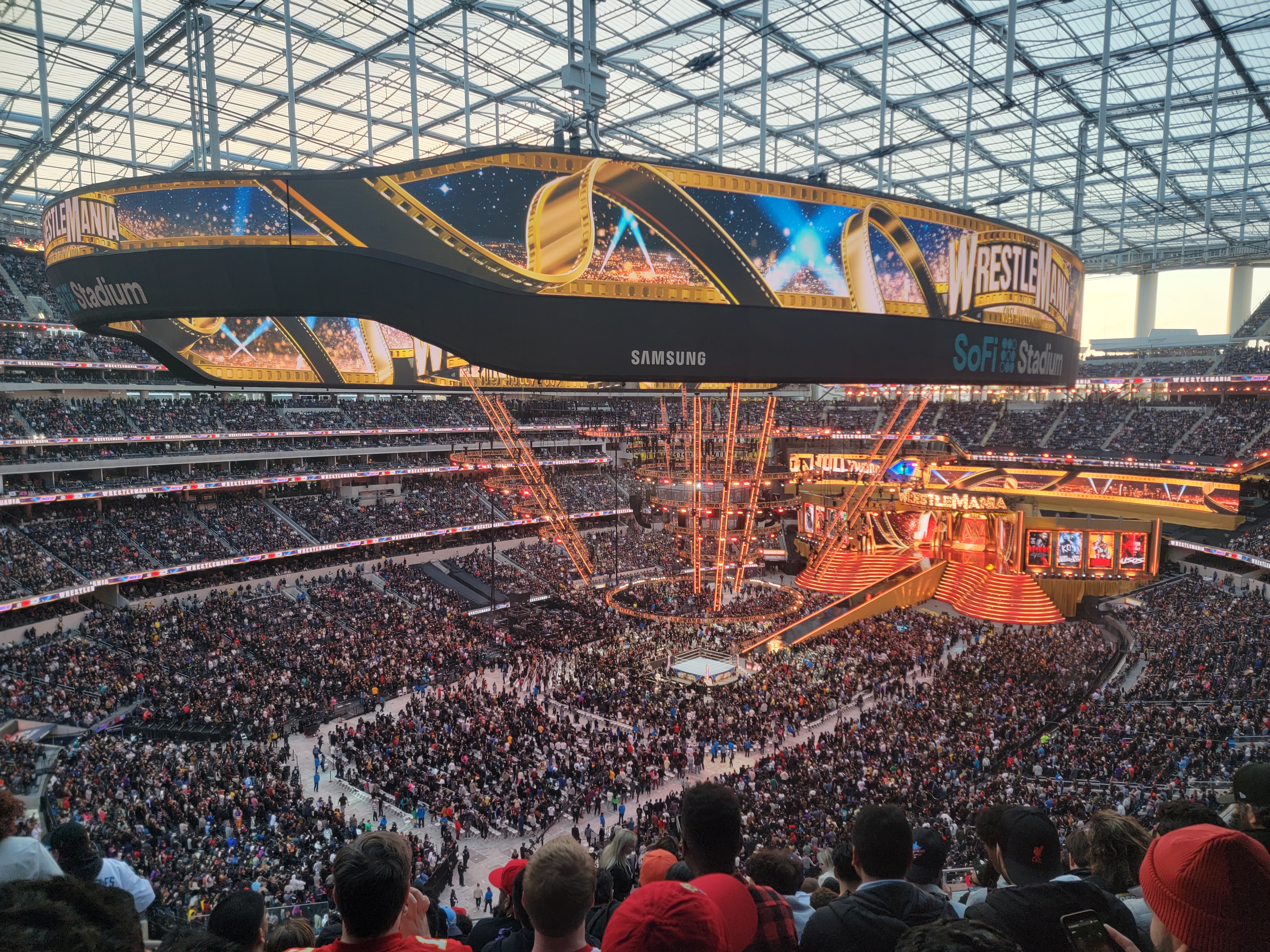
A reported 67,553 fans at SoFi Stadium for Night 2 of WrestleMania 39

Tickets for the event went on sale on August 12, 2022. WWE also announced that WrestleMania Priority Passes would be available beginning July 22. These passes included premier seating, a dedicated stadium entrance, premium hospitality offerings, and meet-and-greets with current WWE wrestlers and legends. Ticket sales for WrestleMania 39 set a company record, with over 90,000 tickets sold within the first 24 hours, more than any other WWE event in history at the time. On February 27, 2023, it was revealed that WWE wrestler The Miz would serve as the host of the event. The official theme songs for WrestleMania 39 were "Less than Zero" by The Weeknd and "Hollywood Swinging" by Kool & the Gang.

WrestleMania was created by WWE owner Vince McMahon. In July 2022, McMahon announced his retirement, after having served as chairman and chief executive officer (CEO) of the company since 1982. His daughter, Stephanie McMahon, along with WWE president Nick Khan, took over as co-CEOs, and the former also took over as Chairwoman of WWE. Vince's son-in-law, Stephanie's husband, Paul "Triple H" Levesque took over creative control. Stephanie would resign as co-CEO and chairwoman in January 2023, and Vince would return as Executive Chairman while Khan became the sole CEO. Although Vince returned in an executive role, Triple H maintained complete creative control of booking WWE's storylines.

=== Broadcast outlets ===
Both nights of WrestleMania 39 were available through traditional PPV outlets worldwide. They were also available to livestream on Peacock in the United States, SonyLIV in India, Disney+ Hotstar in Indonesia, Disney+ in the Philippines, Binge in Australia, and the WWE Network everywhere else. It was the first WrestleMania to livestream on Disney+ in the Philippines, following the shutdown of its version of the WWE Network in November 2022, and it was also the first WrestleMania to livestream on Binge in Australia after the Australian version of the WWE Network merged under Foxtel's channel Binge in January.

=== Celebrity involvement ===
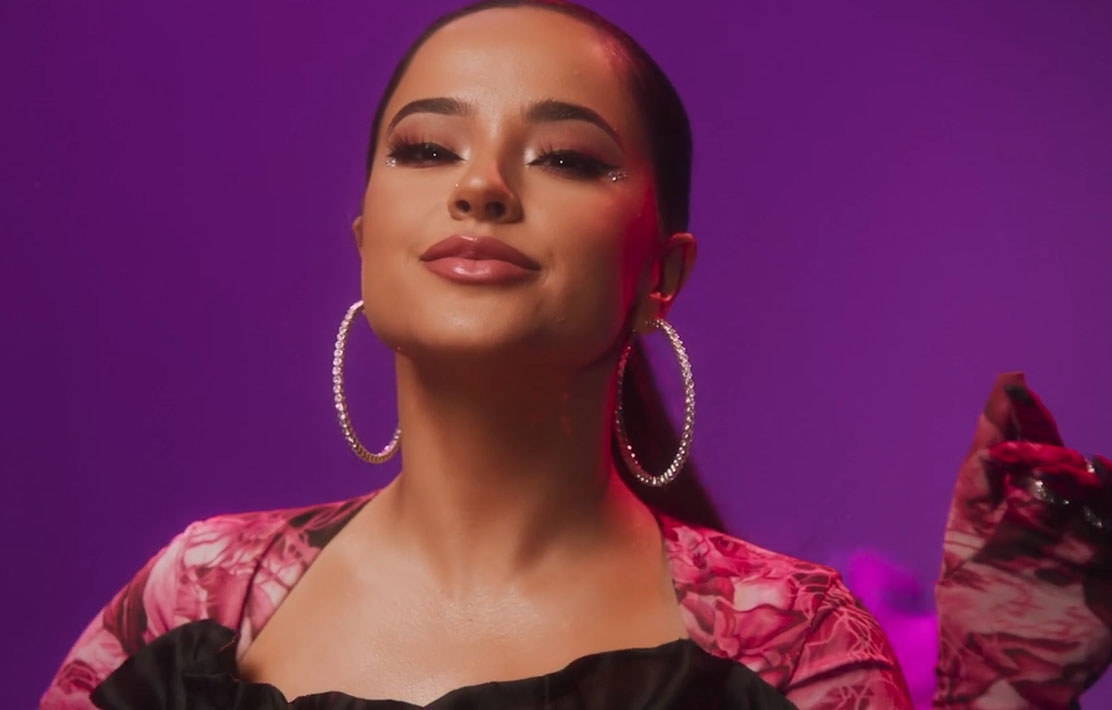
Becky G sang "America the Beautiful" to open Night 1.

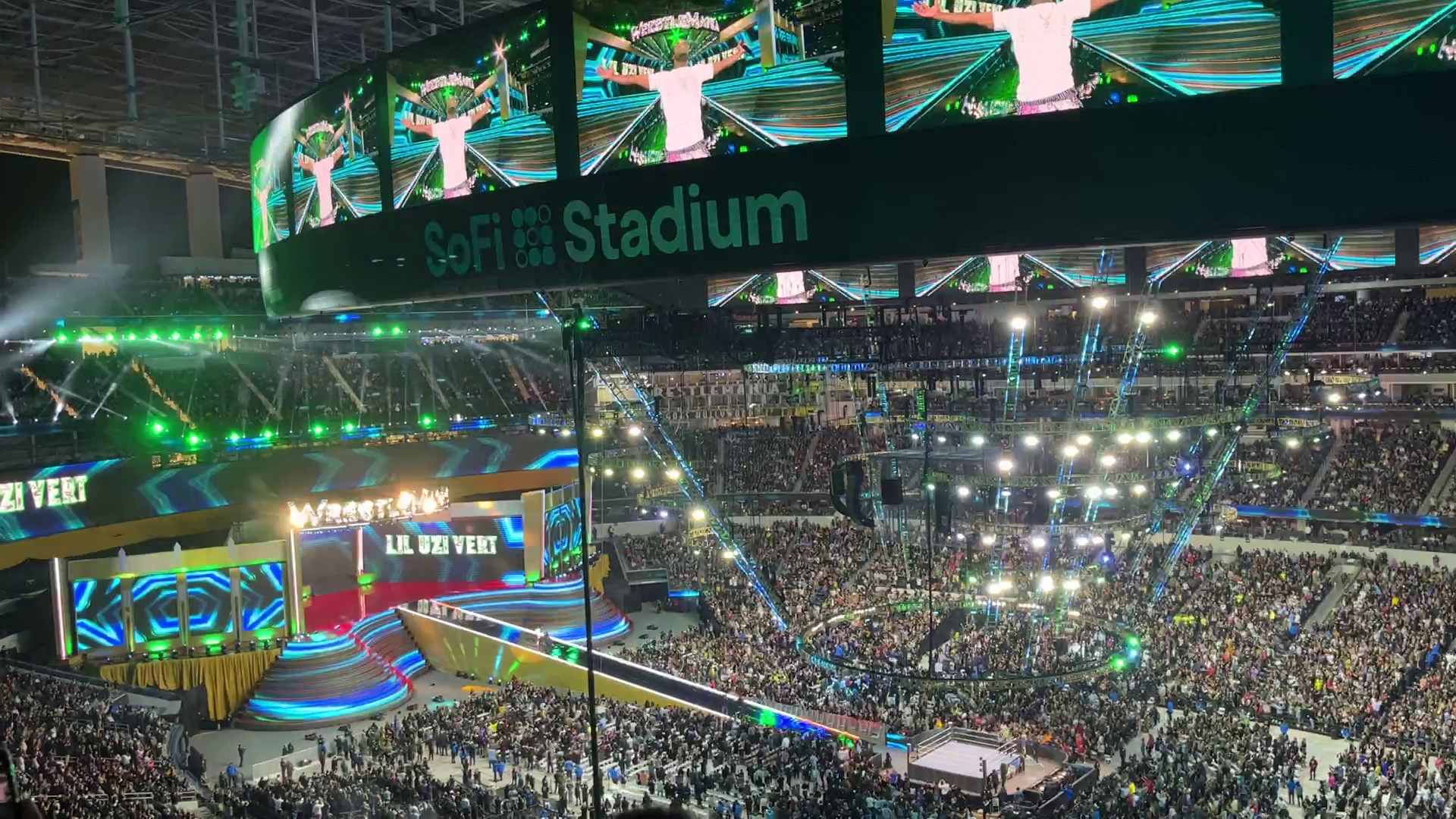
Rapper Lil Uzi Vert performed a portion of their song "Just Wanna Rock" prior to the main event of Night 1.

Celebrities from outside of WWE were involved in various roles. Pop/reggaeton singer Becky G performed "America the Beautiful" for Night 1, while country singer Jimmie Allen did the same for Night 2. Actor and comedian Kevin Hart did the cold open for both nights of the event. Rapper and WWE Hall of Famer Snoop Dogg co-hosted the event alongside The Miz, drove Rey Mysterio out for his entrance on Night 1 in a tribute to Eddie Guerrero, and wrestled an impromptu improvised match during Night 2. Rapper Bad Bunny was also a guest commentator on the Spanish commentary team for Mysterio's match. YouTuber, rapper, and boxer KSI was involved in Logan Paul's match on Night 1, disguised as the Prime energy drink mascot, a brand he co-owns with Paul. San Francisco 49ers tight end George Kittle was in attendance and assisted Pat McAfee in his match against The Miz on Night 1. Rapper Lil Uzi Vert performed a portion of his song "Just Wanna Rock" prior to the main event of Night 1.

=== Other WrestleMania Week events ===
As part of the WrestleMania festivities, WWE held a number of events throughout the week. The week kicked off with a special "WrestleMania Edition" of Monday Night Raw on March 27, held at the Footprint Center in Phoenix, Arizona. The night before WrestleMania 39 on March 31, WWE kicked off WrestleMania Weekend itself with a special "WrestleMania Edition" of Friday Night SmackDown, which hosted the André the Giant Memorial Battle Royal, won by Bobby Lashley. Immediately after SmackDown, the 2023 WWE Hall of Fame induction ceremony commenced. The day of WrestleMania Saturday, WWE's developmental brand NXT held its annual WrestleMania Week event, Stand & Deliver. WrestleMania Week concluded with the Raw after WrestleMania on April 3. All of the weekend events were held live at the Crypto.com Arena in Downtown Los Angeles.

On February 1, 12 WWE wrestlers participated in the filming of an episode of Wheel of Fortune for a WWE-themed week that aired during WrestleMania week. It featured the 1996–98 format of 12 players with the three highest scoring participants advancing to the Friday Finals, with the winning civilian earning a trip to WrestleMania. WWE Hall of Famer The Undertaker also brought his 1 deadMAN Show to Los Angeles during WrestleMania Weekend, which is a one-man touring show in which he tells stories from his 30-year career. It was held at The Novo at L.A. Live on March 31 at 11 p.m. Eastern Time.

=== Promotional movie parodies ===
Similar to WrestleMania 21, which also had a Hollywood theme, WrestleMania 39 was promoted on television with a series of parody movie and television trailers with WWE talent playing the starring roles from famous movies and shows.

These included:

- Joker featuring Seth Rollins portraying The Joker in the scene of him dancing down the steps before being confronted by Becky Lynch, portraying Batman.
- Top Gun with The Miz and Maryse walking out on an aircraft carrier dressed in full aviator suits.
- Stranger Things with Rhea Ripley portraying Eleven with a voice over from John Cena portraying Martin Brenner trying to draw out her psychic powers.
- Titanic with Bianca Belair and Montez Ford reenacting the scene of Jack and Rose on the front of the ship.
- The 40-Year-Old Virgin with Drew McIntyre and The Brawling Brutes (Sheamus, Ridge Holland, and Butch) reenacting the chest waxing scene with Holland getting his chest waxed.
- Goodfellas with The Bloodline (Roman Reigns, Jey Uso, Jimmy Uso, Solo Sikoa, and Paul Heyman) reenacting the bar scene.

=== Storylines ===
The event included matches that each resulted from scripted storylines. Results were predetermined by WWE's writers on the Raw and SmackDown brands, while storylines were produced on WWE's weekly television shows, Monday Night Raw and Friday Night SmackDown.

==== Main event matches ====
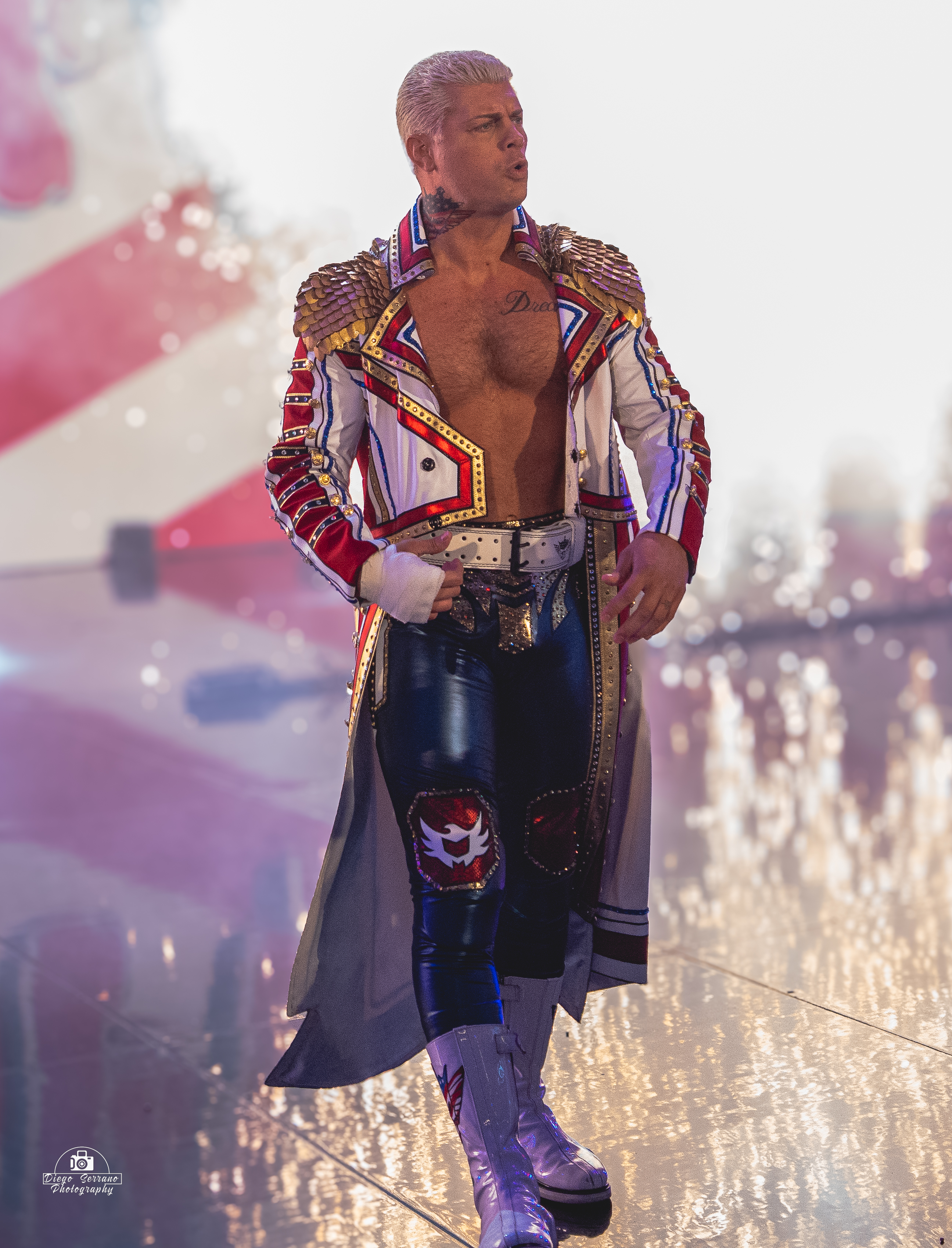
Cody Rhodes, who returned to WWE at the previous year's WrestleMania, competed for the Undisputed WWE Universal Championship at WrestleMania 39 in the main event of Night 2.

At WrestleMania 38, Cody Rhodes made a surprise return to WWE after having been away from the company for six years—during this time, he reestablished himself by wrestling in various other promotions and helped found All Elite Wrestling (AEW) in January 2019. At the same event, Roman Reigns became the Undisputed WWE Universal Champion by retaining SmackDown's Universal Championship and winning Raw's WWE Championship. On the Raw after WrestleMania, Rhodes stated that he returned to win the WWE Championship, not only for himself, but also for his late father, Dusty, who never won the title. In June, Rhodes suffered a pectoral injury, which sidelined him for several months. At the 2023 Royal Rumble, Rhodes returned and won the men's Royal Rumble match to earn a match against Reigns for the Undisputed WWE Universal Championship at WrestleMania 39 in the main event of Night 2.

While Rhodes simply wanted to win the championship to bring honor to his family, Reigns, by way of his special counsel Paul Heyman, made it personal, with Heyman stating that Dusty's last words to him were that although Cody was his favorite son, Reigns, who Dusty trained, was the son he always wanted. On the March 3 episode of SmackDown, Rhodes confronted Reigns face-to-face for the first time. Rhodes claimed that throughout his career, he had always overcome the odds and would do it again at WrestleMania. Reigns reinforced what Heyman had said, and then told Rhodes that at WrestleMania, if there was anything that Dusty did not teach his own son, Reigns would. This match also made Reigns the first wrestler to defend a world championship at three consecutive WrestleMania's during the same reign.

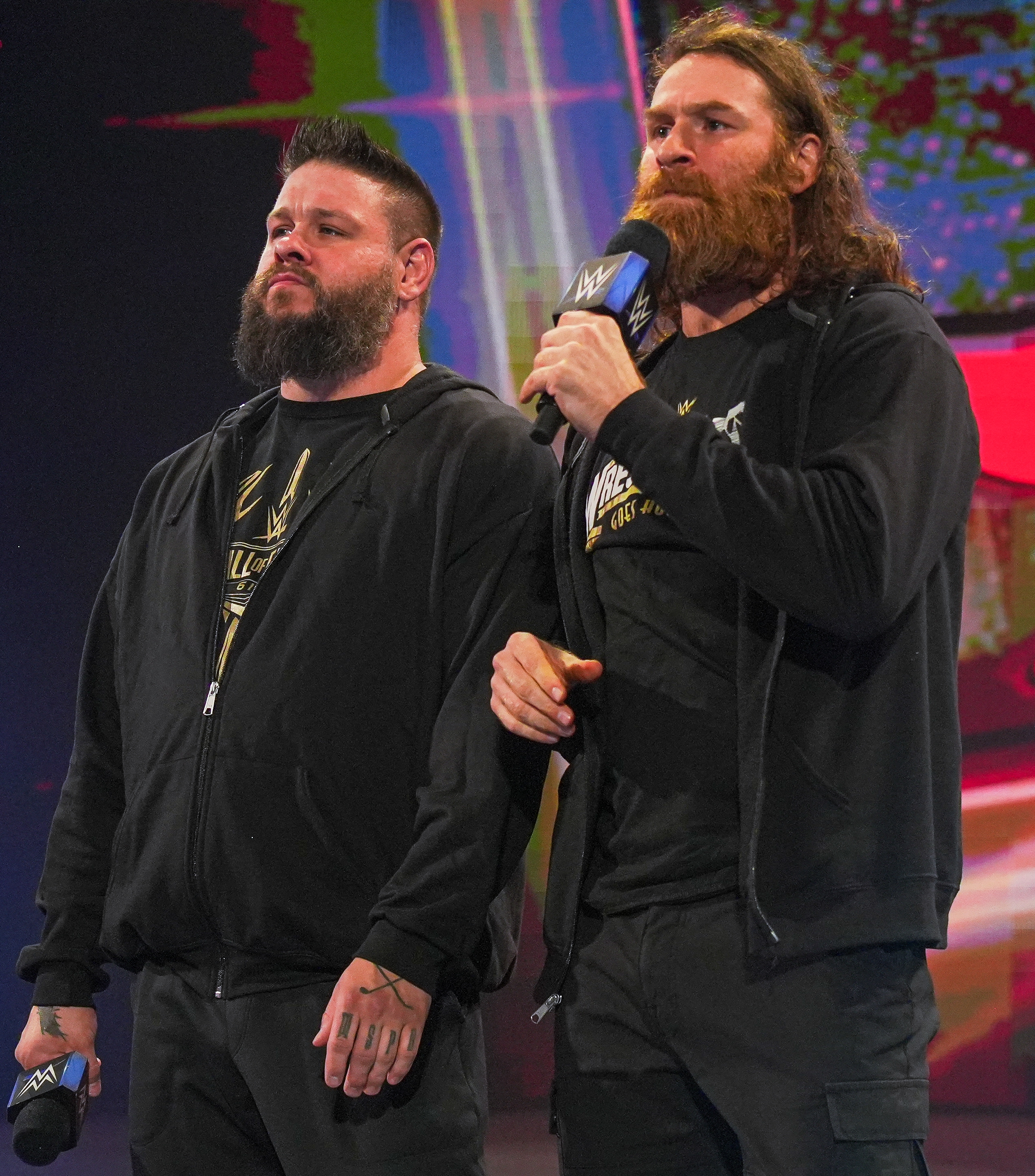
The team of Kevin Owens and Sami Zayn challenged for the Undisputed WWE Tag Team Championship at WrestleMania 39 in the main event of Night 1.

Since late 2020, Kevin Owens had an on and off feud with The Bloodline. At Survivor Series: WarGames in November 2022, Owens was on the opposing team in a WarGames match against The Bloodline, which included Owens's long time frenemy Sami Zayn, who joined The Bloodline as an honorary member in mid-2022. The Bloodline was victorious at Survivor Series thanks to Zayn betraying Owens. After Bloodline leader Roman Reigns defeated Owens at the 2023 Royal Rumble, Bloodline members The Usos (Jey Uso and Jimmy Uso) and Solo Sikoa attacked Owens, while Zayn watched on in uncertainty. Zayn then intervened when Reigns was about to hit Owens in the head with a steel chair, at which point, Reigns ordered Zayn to attack Owens with the chair, but Zayn turned on Reigns and hit him with the chair. Zayn apologized to Jey, who he had become close with, only for Jimmy, Sikoa, and Reigns to attack Zayn as an emotionally distraught Jey left the ring as the rest of The Bloodline continued the assault. This led to an Undisputed WWE Universal Championship match between Reigns and Zayn at Elimination Chamber where Reigns won, but after the match, Owens prevented The Bloodline (except an absent Jey) from further attacking Zayn.

On the following Raw, Zayn said that despite their rough history, he and Owens should work together to take down The Bloodline. Owens said that he only assisted Zayn so that Zayn's family would not have to see him get destroyed like Owens did in front of his own family at the Royal Rumble and he told Zayn he would continue fighting alone. Over the next weeks, Zayn tried to convince The Usos that Reigns was manipulating them. Jimmy maintained his loyalty to his family, while Jey's uncertainty continued until the March 6 episode of Raw where he seemingly sided with Zayn, but then turned on him because Zayn was not family. The following week, Reigns's WrestleMania opponent Cody Rhodes attempted to help resolve issues between Owens and Zayn, but Owens refused; however, later that night, Owens came to Zayn's aid, who got ambushed by The Usos, and Owens and Zayn embraced. On the March 20 episode of Raw, The Usos accepted Owens and Zayn's challenge for a match at WrestleMania 39 for the Undisputed WWE Tag Team Championship. The match was scheduled for Night 1 in what would become the main event, marking the second WrestleMania in which a tag team match was the main event, after the very first WrestleMania in March 1985, but the first time for a tag team championship match to main event WrestleMania.

==== Undercard matches ====
At the Royal Rumble, Raw's Rhea Ripley won the women's Royal Rumble match to earn a women's championship match of her choice at WrestleMania 39. On the following episode of Raw, she chose to challenge Charlotte Flair for the SmackDown Women's Championship, setting up a WrestleMania rematch between the two from WrestleMania 36 in 2020, where Flair had won that year's Royal Rumble and had chosen and defeated Ripley for the NXT Women's Championship. This subsequently marked the first women's WrestleMania rematch to happen at a WrestleMania, which was scheduled for Night 1 of the event.

Due to the aforementioned women's Royal Rumble match winner choosing the SmackDown Women's Championship, an Elimination Chamber match was scheduled for the eponymous event to determine Bianca Belair's challenger for the Raw Women's Championship at WrestleMania 39. The match was won by Asuka, and the title match was scheduled for Night 2.

On the February 20 episode of Raw, Omos and his manager MVP addressed the match between Brock Lesnar and Bobby Lashley from Elimination Chamber. MVP called Lesnar a coward and claimed that Lesnar intentionally disqualified himself because Lesnar knew he could not break Lashley's Hurt Lock submission. MVP then invited Lesnar to Raw the following week to accept Omos's challenge for a match at WrestleMania 39. The following week, after MVP sold him on the match, Lesnar accepted, and the match was scheduled for Night 2.

On the March 10 episode of SmackDown, a fatal five-way match was contested where the winner would face Gunther for the Intercontinental Championship at WrestleMania 39. The match ended in a double pinfall, with Drew McIntyre and Sheamus named co-winners. It was then announced that the two would face each other the following week to determine the definitive number one contender, however, that match ended in a no-contest after Imperium (Gunther, Ludwig Kaiser, and Giovanni Vinci) attacked both participants. WWE official Adam Pearce then decided that Gunther would defend the championship against both McIntyre and Sheamus in a triple threat match at WrestleMania 39 on Night 2.

Since April 2022, Austin Theory and John Cena had been teasing a match against each other over social media. The two briefly came face-to-face during Cena's 20-year anniversary celebration on the June 27, 2022, episode of Raw, where Theory mocked Cena and called him out of touch. In February 2023, during the Elimination Chamber post-event press conference after Theory had retained the United States Championship at the event, Theory was annoyed that everyone was asking about Cena instead of his own accomplishments. After it was announced that Cena would be making his return on the March 6 episode of Raw, Theory stated that he would be giving him a warm welcome back. Theory confronted Cena on that episode and claimed that Cena was an inspiration to him and then challenged Cena to face him at WrestleMania 39 for the United States Championship, however, Cena declined as he felt Theory was not ready. After some coaxing from Theory, Cena allowed his hometown of Boston to decide, and they cheered to see the match, which prompted Cena to accept the challenge. On March 24, it was confirmed that the match would open Night 1.

At the Royal Rumble, Logan Paul, who had been out with an injury since Crown Jewel in November 2022, made a surprise return as an entrant in the men's Royal Rumble match and eliminated Seth Rollins. Following this, Rollins began bad mouthing Paul in interviews, stating that he did not want Paul to be in WWE. At Elimination Chamber during the titular match, Paul snuck into the Chamber and attacked Rollins, costing him the United States Championship. Paul accepted Rollins's invitation to appear on the March 6 episode of Raw, where Rollins wanted to fight only for Paul to decline and state that he would not fight for free and hinted that they could fight at WrestleMania 39. WrestleMania host The Miz then claimed that he could make the match official, and it was later confirmed. On his Impaulsive podcast, Paul stated that the match would be happening on Night 1.

At SummerSlam in July 2022, Bayley made her return from injury alongside Dakota Kai and Iyo Sky after Becky Lynch's match. Lynch would take time off due to an attack from Bayley, Kai, and Sky and the three dubbed themselves as Damage CTRL. Lynch made her return in November, and led her team in defeating Damage CTRL's team in a WarGames match at Survivor Series: WarGames. Over the next few weeks, Damage CTRL continued targeting Lynch and on the February 6, 2023, episode of Raw, during a Steel Cage match between Lynch and Bayley, WWE Hall of Famer Lita returned and prevented Kai and Sky from interfering in the match, allowing Lynch to defeat Bayley. Lynch and Lita then defeated Kai and Sky on the February 27 episode to win the WWE Women's Tag Team Championship, thanks to returning fellow Hall of Famer, Trish Stratus, who prevented Bayley from interfering. The following week, Stratus, who had retired at SummerSlam in 2019, stated that she was coming out of retirement so that she, Lynch, and Lita could challenge Damage CTRL to a six-woman tag team match at WrestleMania 39 and Damage CTRL accepted. On The Tommy Tiernan Show, Lynch confirmed the match would be on Night 1.

At WrestleMania 38, Edge won his match thanks to a distraction from Damian Priest. The two then formed a faction named The Judgment Day. Over the next couple of months, Rhea Ripley and Finn Bálor would also be added to the group. In June, however, Bálor, Priest, and Ripley turned on Edge, kicking him out of the group. In September, The Judgment Day recruited Dominik Mysterio. Edge continued his feud with The Judgment Day over the next few months, and he and his wife Beth Phoenix teamed up to defeat Bálor and Ripley at Elimination Chamber. On the following episode of Raw, Edge, who felt his feud with The Judgment Day was over, lost his United States Championship match after interference from Bálor. The following week, Bálor said their feud was not done and challenged Edge to a match at WrestleMania 39. On the following week's episode, Edge interfered in Bálor's match, causing him to lose, and Edge challenged Bálor to meet him alone on the next episode. There, the two agreed to a Hell in a Cell match at WrestleMania 39 with Edge wanting to face Bálor's "Demon" persona and Bálor agreed. The match was scheduled for Night 2.

Rey Mysterio would also have his own issues with The Judgment Day, which only heightened when his own son Dominik turned on him to join Judgment Day at Clash at the Castle in September 2022. Rey refused to fight his own son and was about to quit WWE, but he was convinced to stay, and he was traded to the SmackDown brand to avoid Judgment Day on Raw. However, their paths would cross again at the Royal Rumble. Rey was supposed to compete in the men's Royal Rumble match, but he never came out when his entrance music played. Dominik then entered, carrying Rey's mask, implying that he attacked his dad to prevent him from entering. With Judgment Day's Rhea Ripley winning the women's Royal Rumble and choosing to challenge for the SmackDown Women's Championship, the group began appearing on SmackDown, thus Dominik began tormenting his dad again. On the March 10 episode, after it was announced that Rey would be the first inductee into the WWE Hall of Fame Class of 2023, The Judgment Day interrupted and Dominik said his dad did not deserve the recognition. The following week, an emotional Rey said he wanted Dominik by his side for his Hall of Fame induction, but Dominik instead tried goading Rey into a match at WrestleMania 39. Rey, however, affirmed his position that he would not fight his son. On the March 24 episode, the Mysterio family were in attendance for Rey's match, which he lost thanks to interference from Dominik. Afterwards, Dominik disrespected his mother and sister, forcing Rey to intervene and hit Dominik. Rey then accepted the challenge for a match at WrestleMania 39, which was scheduled for Night 1. During this time, Legado Del Fantasma (Santos Escobar, Joaquin Wilde, Cruz Del Toro, and Zelina Vega) assisted Rey against The Judgment Day. On the March 31 episode of SmackDown, they said they would have Rey's back if Judgment Day tried interfering at WrestleMania and Rey revived the Latino World Order (LWO), a faction Rey was a member of in World Championship Wrestling.

On the March 17 episode of SmackDown, it was announced that at WrestleMania 39, there would be two WrestleMania Showcase matches, which would be fatal four-way tag team matches, with one each for the men and women. Qualifying matches for the women's Showcase began that night. Liv Morgan and Raquel Rodriguez qualified first by defeating Tegan Nox and Emma. The following week, Natalya and Shotzi qualified by defeating Xia Li and Lacey Evans, and after the match, Ronda Rousey and Shayna Baszler were added, bypassing a qualifier match. The final qualifying match took place on the March 27 episode of Raw, with Chelsea Green and Sonya Deville qualifying by defeating "Michin" Mia Yim and Candice LeRae. No qualifying matches were held for the men's Showcase as all four teams were announced on March 20: Braun Strowman and Ricochet, The Viking Raiders (Erik and Ivar), The Street Profits (Angelo Dawkins and Montez Ford), and Alpha Academy (Chad Gable and Otis). The men's Showcase was scheduled for Night 1 with the women's on Night 2.

==== Canceled match ====
On the SmackDown before Elimination Chamber, Bray Wyatt stated that at WrestleMania, he would be challenging the winner of the Brock Lesnar vs. Bobby Lashley match occurring at Elimination Chamber. Lashley would win the match by disqualification and on the following Raw, he said that no one, including Wyatt, could break his Hurt Lock submission and stated that everyone needed to show him respect or else he would put them down. Wyatt then began playing head games with Lashley on subsequent episodes of Raw and SmackDown, which further enraged him. Lashley then appeared on the March 3 episode of SmackDown to confront Wyatt, but was instead confronted by Wyatt's accomplice Uncle Howdy, who Lashley fended off. However, later that month, with Wyatt absent, the angle was dropped. It was then reported that Wyatt was dealing with an undisclosed illness. On August 19, it was revealed that the illness was life-threatening, but he was making positive progress towards a return. However, just five days later on August 24, Wyatt unexpectedly died of a heart attack. It was also revealed that the illness was COVID-19, which had exacerbated an existing heart issue.

== Event ==
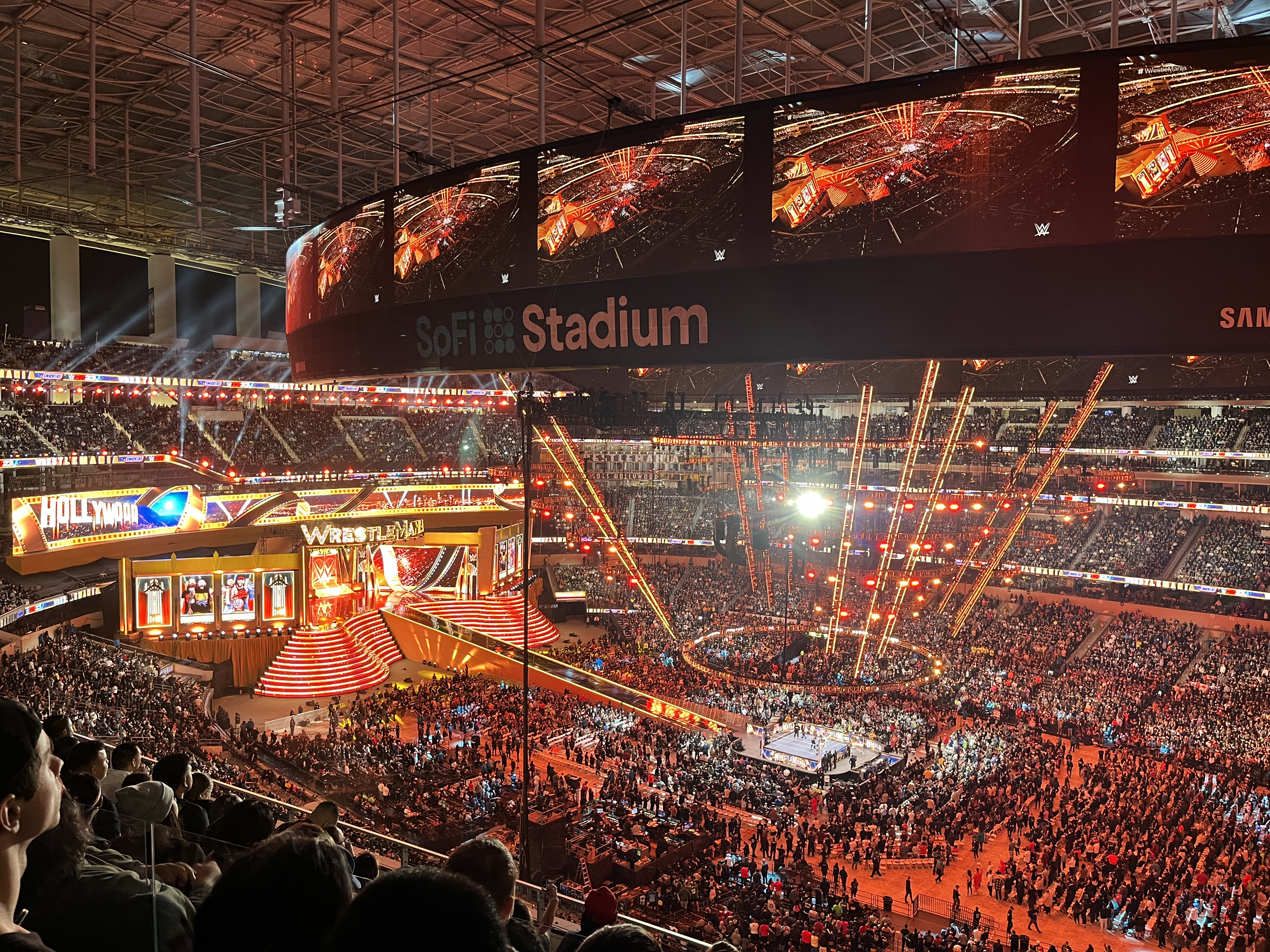
SoFi Stadium during WrestleMania 39

=== Night 1 ===
Other on-screen personnel – Saturday
Role	Name
Host	The Miz
Host	Snoop Dogg
English commentators	Michael Cole
English commentators	Corey Graves
English commentators	Titus O'Neil (Men's WrestleMania Showcase)
Spanish commentators	Marcelo Rodriguez
Spanish commentators	Jerry Soto
Spanish commentators	Bad Bunny (Rey vs. Dominik)
Ring announcers	Mike Rome (Raw)
Ring announcers	Samantha Irvin (SmackDown)
Referees	Danilo Anfibio
Referees	Shawn Bennett
Referees	Jessika Carr
Referees	Daphanie LaShaunn
Referees	Eddie Orengo
Referees	Chad Patton
Referees	Ryan Tran
Referees	Rod Zapata
Interviewers	Byron Saxton
Interviewers	Cathy Kelley
Pre-show panel	Kayla Braxton
Pre-show panel	Peter Rosenberg
Pre-show panel	Booker T
Pre-show panel	Wade Barrett

==== Preliminary matches ====
WrestleMania Saturday began with WrestleMania hosts, The Miz and Snoop Dogg, hyping up the crowd for the event.

In the first match for Night 1, Austin Theory defended Raw's United States Championship against John Cena. During the match, Cena applied the STF on Theory, who bit the hand of Cena to void the submission. After performing the Five Knuckle Shuffle on Theory, Cena attempted an Attitude Adjustment on Theory, however, Theory inadvertently incapacitated the referee before escaping. In the climax, Cena applied the STF submission on Theory, who eventually submitted, however, the referee was still incapacitated. As Cena attempted to revive the referee, Theory performed a low blow and an A-Town Down on Cena to retain the title.

Next, Braun Strowman and Ricochet, The Street Profits (Angelo Dawkins and Montez Ford), Alpha Academy (Chad Gable and Otis), and The Viking Raiders (Erik and Ivar, accompanied by Valhalla) competed in the fatal four-way Men's WrestleMania Showcase match. During the match, a standoff ensued between all four teams with Viking Raiders dominating the other three teams. In the end, as Ricochet attempted a Shooting Star Press on Dawkins, Dawkins' raised his knees to block the impact. Dawkins then placed Ricochet on his knees and Ford then performed the From the Heavens splash on Ricochet. Dawkins then pinned Ricochet to win the match.

After that, Seth Rollins faced Logan Paul (accompanied by the Prime energy drink mascot, one of Paul's associated brands). During the match, Rollins performed the Stomp on Paul's right hand, which was on the steel steps. Paul, however, managed to still perform the right hand punch on Rollins for a nearfall. Rollins performed a sit-out Powerbomb on Paul for a nearfall. As Rollins attempted the Stomp, the Prime Energy mascot pulled Paul out of the ring and revealed himself as KSI. Rollins confronted KSI, only for Paul to throw Rollins into the ringpost. After KSI and Paul cleared the announce table, Paul then placed Rollins on the announce table. As Paul attempted a frog splash to Rollins on the table, Rollins pulled KSI onto the table, and Paul inadvertently performed the frog splash on KSI. Back in the ring, Rollins performed the Pedigree on Paul for a nearfall. Paul performed a frog splash on Rollins from the top turnbuckle for a nearfall. In the closing moments, as Paul attempted a Coast-To-Coast on Rollins, Rollins countered into a superkick and performed the Stomp on Paul to win the match.

In the fourth match, Damage CTRL (Bayley, Dakota Kai, and Iyo Sky) faced off against Lita, Trish Stratus, and Becky Lynch. Before the match began, a brawl ensued between all six women. In the end, Lita performed a Twist of Fate on Sky and Stratus performed a Chick Kick on Kai. Lita then performed a Moonsault on Kai and Sky. Bayley attempted a Bayley-to-Bayley on Lynch from the middle rope, however, Lynch countered and performed the Manhandle Slam on Bayley to win the match.

Next, Rey Mysterio faced his son Dominik Mysterio in only the second-ever father-son match at WrestleMania (after Vince McMahon vs. Shane McMahon at WrestleMania X-Seven in April 2001), which was sponsored by Cinnamon Toast Crunch. During the match, Rey sent Dominik into the ring post and attacked him with a belt. Dominik then taunted his mother and sister, who were seated in the front row. Judgement Day teammates, Finn Bálor and Damian Priest, then appeared at ringside. Rey performed the 619 on Dominik and attempted the frog splash, however, Priest shoved Rey off the turnbuckle. After Rey performed a headscissors takedown on Dominik out of the ring, Legado del Fantasma (Santos Escobar, Joaquin Wilde, and Cruz Del Toro) came down and attacked both Bálor and Priest. Dominik performed a 619 and a frog splash on Rey for a nearfall. Following this, Dominik exposed a turnbuckle and while the referee was dealing with that, Dominik obtained a chain from Priest's blazer. As Dominik attempted to strike Rey with the chain, Bad Bunny, who was serving as a guest Spanish commentator, snatched the chain from Dominik. Rey then performed the 619 and the Frog Splash on Dominik to win the match. Following the match, Rey embraced his family in the ring.

Following that, Charlotte Flair defended the SmackDown Women's Championship against Rhea Ripley. As Ripley attempted her Riptide finisher, Flair reversed it into a DDT for a nearfall. Ripley then performed a top-rope inverted German suplex on Flair for a nearfall. Flair performed a Natural Selection on Ripley for a nearfall. Ripley performed a suplex on Flair, who landed on her face. Flair then performed a moonsault on Ripley onto the floor. As Flair attempted a Spear, Ripley moved out of the way and Flair almost collided with the referee. Ripley performed a headbutt and the Riptide on Flair for a nearfall. Flair performed a Spear on Ripley for a nearfall. Flair then applied the figure four leglock, however, Ripley reached the ropes to void the submission. Flair then climbed to the top rope, attempting for a fallway slam on Ripley, however, Ripley slammed Flair's head into the top of the ring post and performed an avalanche Riptide on Flair to win the title, making Ripley the first woman to defeat Flair in a singles match at WrestleMania. Ripley subsequently became the first woman to win the Raw, SmackDown, NXT, NXT UK, and WWE Women's Tag Team championships.

WrestleMania hosts The Miz and Snoop Dogg then came out to announce the attendance for Night 1 of 80,497. Snoop Dogg then claimed that the only thing better than an attendance record is for Miz to compete in a match, just as Pat McAfee made his return in his first appearance since Royal Rumble 2023. Snoop Dogg, as the co-host, made the match official. During the match, McAfee dominated The Miz. In the closing moments of the impromptu penultimate match, The Miz shoved San Francisco 49ers player George Kittle, who was a seated at ringside. Kittle then jumped the barricade and struck The Miz, unbeknownst to the referee. McAfee then delivered a Swanton off the top turnbuckle to the Miz. McAfee then performed the Punt to The Miz to win the match. Following the match, McAfee celebrated with Kittle.

==== Main event ====
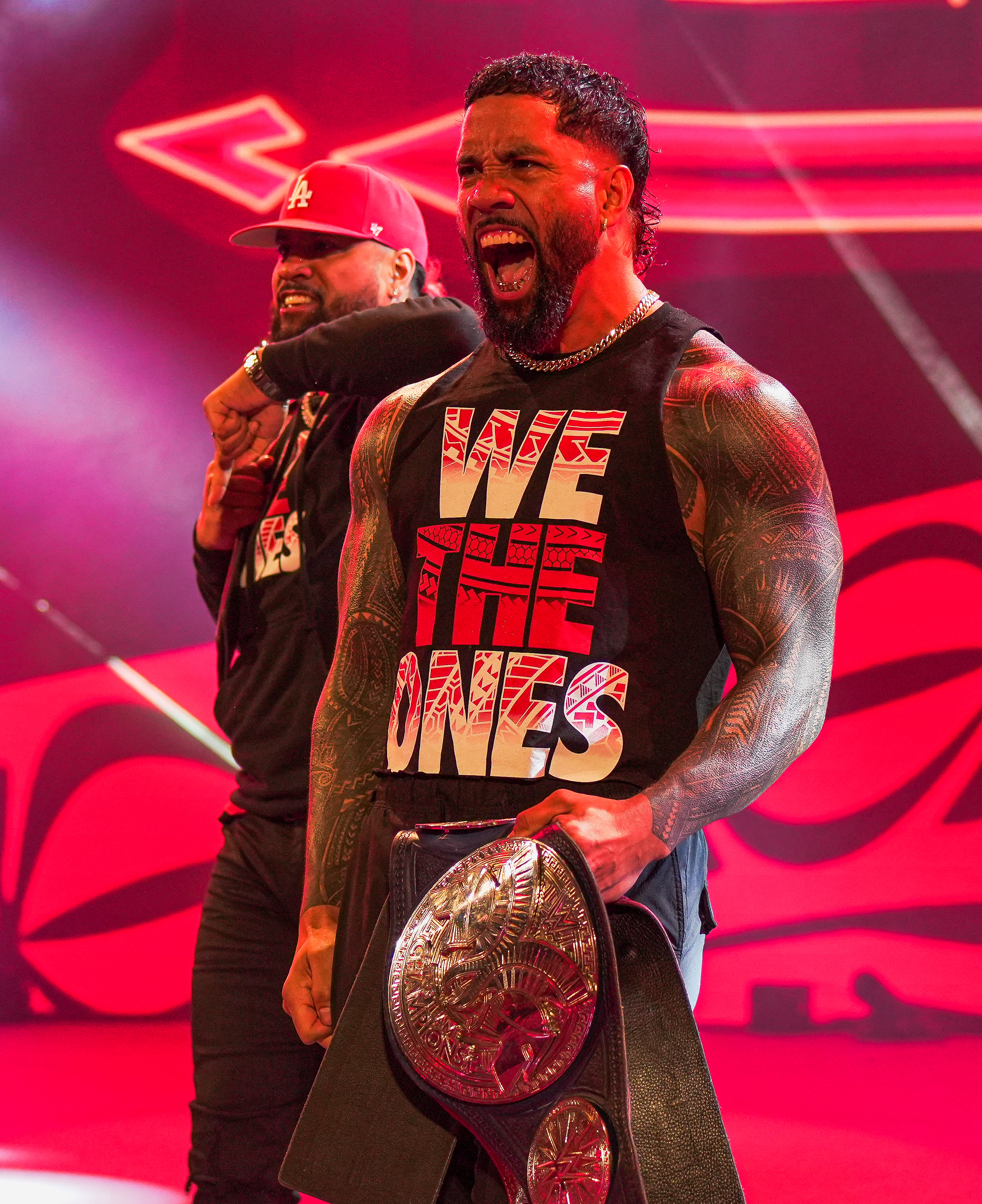
The Usos (Jey Uso and Jimmy Uso) defended the SmackDown Tag Team Championship simultaneously with the Raw Tag Team Championship as the Undisputed WWE Tag Team Championship in the main event of Night 1, which was the first tag team championship match to main event a WrestleMania. The Usos lost to Kevin Owens and Sami Zayn, ending their record-setting SmackDown Tag Team Championship reign at 622 days, which is the longest male tag team championship reign in WWE history.

In the main event for Night 1, The Usos (Jey Uso and Jimmy Uso) defended the Undisputed WWE Tag Team Championship against Kevin Owens and Sami Zayn, marking the first tag team championship match to main event a WrestleMania, and only the second tag team match in general to main event, after WrestleMania I in March 1985. After dominating both Usos, Owens performed a Frog Splash on Jey for a nearfall. Jimmy performed an Uso Splash on Owens for a nearfall. Zayn performed a brainbuster on Jey on ring apron, allowing Owens to deliver a Swanton Bomb for a nearfall. Zayn performed the Uso Splash on Jey for a nearfall. Both Usos then performed multiple superkicks on Zayn, however, Owens broke up the pin attempt. Both Usos then continued attacking Zayn with superkicks. As Owens was looking for a powerbomb to Jimmy on top of an announce table, Jey broke it up and both Usos delivered double chokeslams to Owens through the announce table. The Usos continued performing superkicks on Zayn and performed the 1-D for a nearfall, marking the first time a wrestler kicked out of the 1-D. Jey then attacked Zayn with Zayn's own finisher, the Helluva Kick. Zayn then performed an Exploder Suplex on Jey in the corner.

Owens performed pop-up powerbombs on both Usos, allowing Zayn to perform the Helluva Kick on Jimmy and Owens performed the Stunner on Jey for a nearfall. In the closing moments, Owens performed a top rope Fisherman's Buster on Jey and Zayn, who then tagged in, followed up with two Helluva Kicks on Jey. Owens performed the Stunner on Jimmy, and Zayn delivered one more Helluva Kick to Jey to win the titles and end The Usos' 622 day reign as SmackDown Tag Team Champions. As a result of this win, Owens became a Grand Slam Champion, as well as the first Quebec-born Grand Slam Champion in history; as for both Zayn and Owens, they became the first Quebec-born wrestlers to win a tag team championship since The Quebecers (Jacques Rougeau and Pierre Carl Ouellet) accomplished the feat 30 years prior to this event.

=== Night 2 ===
Other on-screen personnel – Sunday
Role	Name
Host	The Miz
Host	Snoop Dogg
English commentators	Michael Cole
English commentators	Corey Graves
English commentators	Titus O'Neil (Intercontinental Championship match)
Spanish commentators	Marcelo Rodriguez
Spanish commentators	Jerry Soto
Ring announcers	Mike Rome (Raw)
Ring announcers	Samantha Irvin (SmackDown)
Referees	Danilo Anfibio
Referees	Jason Ayers
Referees	Shawn Bennett
Referees	Jessika Carr
Referees	Dan Engler
Referees	Daphne Lashaunn
Referees	Eddie Orengo
Referees	Chad Patton
Interviewer	Cathy Kelley
Pre-show panel	Kayla Braxton
Pre-show panel	Kevin Patrick
Pre-show panel	Peter Rosenberg
Pre-show panel	Booker T
Pre-show panel	Wade Barrett

==== Preliminary matches ====
WrestleMania Sunday began with The Miz and Snoop Dogg hyping up the crowd for the event for Night 2.

In the first match, Brock Lesnar fought Omos (accompanied by MVP). During the match, Omos dominated Lesnar and applied the bear hug on Lesnar. Omos performed a chokeslam on Lesnar for a nearfall. In the climax, as Lesnar attempted an F-5, Omos escaped, however, Lesnar responded by performing three German suplexes and an F-5 on Omos to win the match.

Next was the Women's WrestleMania Showcase match contested between Ronda Rousey and Shayna Baszler, Natalya and Shotzi, Chelsea Green and Sonya Deville, and Liv Morgan and Raquel Rodriguez. In the end, Rousey applied the armbar on Shotzi, who submitted, thus Baszler and Rousey won the match.

In a short segment that followed, Bobby Lashley, who had won the André the Giant Memorial Battle Royal on Friday, was introduced to the crowd.

After that, Gunther defended SmackDown's Intercontinental Championship against Drew McIntyre and Sheamus. During the match, Sheamus performed 28 Beats of the Bodhrán on McIntyre. Gunther performed a Powerbomb on McIntyre for a nearfall. Sheamus performed a White Noise off the top turnbuckle on Gunther followed by a Celtic Cross on Gunther for a nearfall. As Sheamus performed the Brogue Kick on Gunther, McIntyre pulled Sheamus out of the ring. Sheamus performed a Brogue Kick on McIntyre for a nearfall. McIntyre then performed a Claymore Kick on Sheamus for a nearfall. In the climax, Sheamus performed the Brogue Kick on McIntyre, however, Gunther voided the pin attempt with a diving splash. Gunther then performed a powerbomb on Sheamus onto McIntyre and another powerbomb on McIntyre to retain the title.

In the next match, Bianca Belair defended the Raw Women's Championship against Asuka. During the match, Belair performed a Powerbomb on Asuka outside the ring. In the closing moments, as Asuka attempted to spray the Asian Mist on Belair, Belair avoided the mist and hoisted Asuka into a Kiss of Death, however, Asuka countered into the armbar submission. Belair then hoisted Asuka while still in the submission and performed the Kiss of Death on Asuka to retain the title.

Next, The Miz and Snoop Dogg came out to announce the attendance for Night 2 of 81,395 and the combined attendance of both nights of 161,892. Miz then stated that he was not ready to compete in a match the previous night, and Snoop Dogg caught him off guard. Miz then boasted about competing in a suit which prompted a returning Shane McMahon, in his first appearance since the 2022 Royal Rumble, to come out and challenge Miz to a match. McMahon would legitimately tear his quadriceps during the match, thus the match was stopped. In an improvised moment, Snoop Dogg then came into the ring, replacing McMahon, punching Miz twice and performing a People's Elbow to win the impromptu match. This made The Miz the first wrestler to lose matches on both nights of WrestleMania since the event switched to a two-night format in 2020.

In the penultimate match, Edge battled "The Demon" Finn Bálor in a Hell in a Cell match. At the start of the match, Edge attacked Bálor with chairs, however, Bálor responded by attacking Edge with a kendo stick. Edge trapped Bálor in the corner of the cell with a kendo stick and performed a dropkick on Bálor. Bálor threw Edge into the steel steps. Bálor performed a dropkick on Edge through a table set up in the corner. After performing the Killswitch on Bálor, Edge threw a ladder onto Bálor, which busted him open. As Bálor attempted a Coup De Grâce on Edge, Edge avoided Bálor and attempted to spear Bálor. Bálor performed a Coup De Grâce on Edge for a nearfall. Edge performed an Edgecution on Bálor off a ladder for a nearfall. Bálor then attacked Edge with a kendo stick and placed him on a table. Bálor then climbed to the wall of the cell and attempted an elevated Coup de Grâce, only for Edge to move out of the way and Bálor crashed through the table. Edge performed a Spear on Bálor for a nearfall. Afterwards, Edge attacked Bálor with kendo sticks and chair shots and then performed a con-chair-to on Bálor to win the match.

==== Main event ====
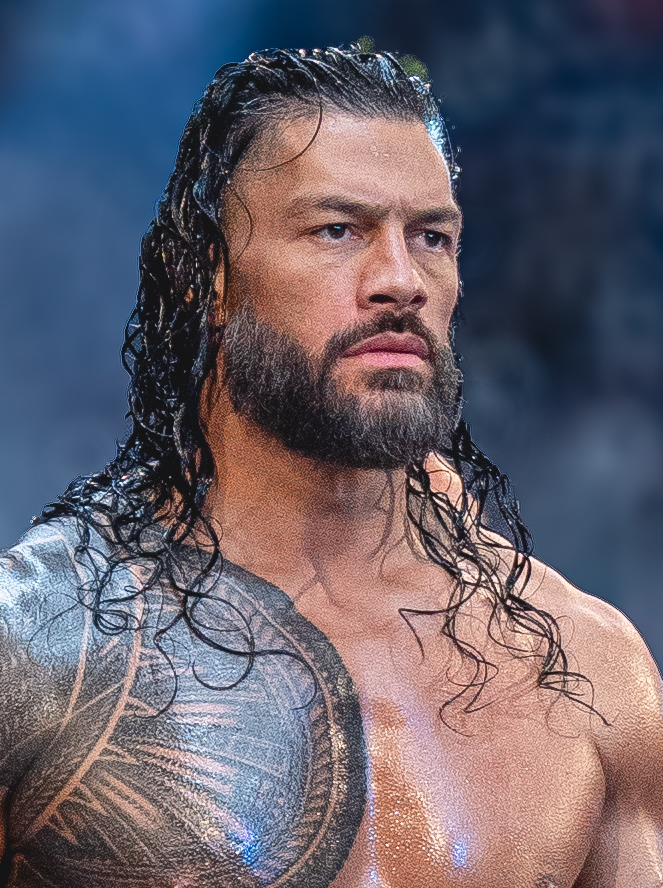
In the main event of Night 2 of WrestleMania 39, Roman Reigns defended the Undisputed WWE Universal Championship (consisting of Raw's WWE Championship and SmackDown's Universal Championship), becoming the first wrestler to defend a world championship at three consecutive WrestleMania's during the same reign, as his Universal Championship reign began in August 2020.

In the main event for Night 2, Roman Reigns (accompanied by Paul Heyman and Solo Sikoa) defended the Undisputed WWE Universal Championship against Cody Rhodes, marking the first time a wrestler defended a world championship at three consecutive WrestleManias during the same reign. After a few minutes of sizing each other up, Rhodes performed a dropkick on Reigns for a one count. While the referee was distracted, Sikoa attacked Rhodes outside the ring, and Reigns covered him for a nearfall. Outside the ring, Rhodes performed a backdrop on Reigns through an announce table. Back inside the ring, Rhodes followed up with a Cody Cutter for a nearfall. Sikoa then attacked Rhodes with Rhodes' weight belt, leading to his ejection from ringside. Rhodes then performed Cross Rhodes on Reigns for a nearfall. Rhodes countered a Superman Punch attempt into a Pedigree for a nearfall. After a sunset flip attempt resulted in a nearfall, Rhodes applied the figure-four leglock on Reigns. Reigns was able to reverse the pressure, but Rhodes reached the ropes to void the submission. As Rhodes leapt off the top rope, Reigns moved out of the way and performed a Spear on Rhodes for a nearfall. Reigns followed up with forearm strikes and applied the Guillotine Choke, but Rhodes was able to escape. Rhodes went to kick Reigns, who dodged and Rhodes accidentally kicked the referee, incapacitating him. Reigns and Rhodes then knocked themselves out with simultaneous clotheslines. Rhodes made it to his feet first and as he attempted a DDT, The Usos (Jey Uso and Jimmy Uso) ran in and attacked Rhodes, performing a 1D on him, only for Kevin Owens and Sami Zayn to make the save, with the two teams brawling into the crowd. Before that, Owens performed a Stunner on Reigns, followed by a Helluva Kick by Zayn on Reigns. With the referee back, Rhodes then covered Reigns for another nearfall. In the closing moments, Reigns and Rhodes exchanged more strikes. Rhodes countered a Superman Punch attempt, performed a Bionic Elbow, and followed up with two more Cross Rhodes. As Rhodes was preparing for a third Cross Rhodes, Heyman distracted the referee, allowing Sikoa to sneak in and perform the Samoan Spike on Rhodes. Reigns then performed a final spear on Rhodes to retain the Undisputed WWE Universal Championship. This marked the seventh time a heel won the main event of WrestleMania, including three in a row for Reigns.

== Reception ==
WrestleMania 39 was the highest-grossing WWE event in history, generating a gate of $21.6 million. Although WWE claimed attendance numbers of 80,497 on Night 1 and 81,395 on Night 2 (161,892 total), wrestling journalist and historian Dave Meltzer contested these figures, saying they sold 67,303 and 67,553 tickets respectively, with maximum capacities of 67,530 and 67,603. Over the two days, more than 500 million views and 11 million hours of video content was streamed via social media. The event also received generally positive reviews from critics, who praised the Undisputed WWE Tag Team Championship match, the Men's WrestleMania Showcase match, Logan Paul vs. Seth Rollins, Rey vs. Dominik Mysterio, and the Hell in a Cell match. The SmackDown Women's Championship match was also lauded by critics, with professional wrestling journalist Dave Meltzer calling it "among the best women's matches in WWE history". However, while the Undisputed WWE Universal Championship match was also praised, its ending was criticized for its repetitiveness. Meltzer gave five-star ratings to both the Undisputed WWE Tag Team Championship match on Night 1 and the Intercontinental Championship match on Night 2; these were the first WrestleMania matches to be awarded five stars by Meltzer since Bret Hart vs. "Stone Cold" Steve Austin at WrestleMania 13 in 1997. In 2025, Drew McIntyre said that the Intercontinental Championship triple threat match was "probably my favorite match ever", adding that he was "so proud of it" and praised both Gunther and Sheamus.

WrestleMania 39 generated $215 million in economic impact for the Los Angeles region, breaking the previous year's record of $206.5 million in economic impact for the Dallas/Arlington region.

Wade Keller of Pro Wrestling Torch gave the Night 2 main event match 4.5 stars, stating, "What a story they told, and they had the crowd every step of the way". There may have been "too many shenanigans with ref bumps and interference", but Keller "wouldn't have been against WWE betting on Cody and going with him here". He also said that "they could think it wasn't time for Cody, but that's not necessarily a vote of no confidence since they could also see money in a rematch or two as "the chase" continues". He concluded by stating that WWE accomplished "fans reacting to near falls and the back and forth the way they did and care deeply about the finish". Shakiel Mahjouri of CBS Sports gave the match an A+ grade, calling it "a truly fantastic outing that had the crowd in the palm of the superstars' hands". He stated that "the outcome subverted expectations and it will be interesting to see where WWE takes things from here".

As part of their year-end professional wrestling awards, ESPN named WrestleMania 39 as the Best PPV Event of the Year for 2023. Of Bleacher Report's 10 best WWE and AEW matches of 2023, the Undisputed WWE Universal Championship match was ranked No. 8, the SmackDown Women's Championship match #6, the Undisputed WWE Tag Team Championship match #4, and the Intercontinental Championship match #1.

=== Auschwitz imagery controversy ===
During the pre-show, WWE showed footage of the Auschwitz death camp in a video promoting the match between Rey Mysterio and Dominik Mysterio. After the footage was used in reference to a staged video purporting to depict Dominik Mysterio's past jail time, the National Holocaust Museum issued a statement condemning WWE for exploiting holocaust imagery. Despite the apology, Holocaust historians remained concerned, with history professor Natalie Belsky telling the Washington Post "Using imagery associated with the Holocaust for essentially what is kind of entertainment purposes can be seen as minimizing what happened and failing to recognize how horrific it was".

== Aftermath ==
Since January 2023, there had been speculation that WWE had been placed up for sale. Hours before WrestleMania 39 Night 2 began, CNBC reported via multiple sources that a deal between WWE and Endeavor, the parent company of Ultimate Fighting Championship (UFC), was imminent. The deal involved a merger of WWE with the UFC into a new publicly traded company, with Endeavor holding a 51% stake. The sale was confirmed the next day on April 3. WrestleMania 39 subsequently became the final WrestleMania in which WWE was still owned and controlled by the McMahon family. The sale closed on September 12, 2023, with WWE and UFC subsequently becoming divisions of a new entity called TKO Group Holdings.

=== Raw ===
Triple H opened the post-WrestleMania episode of Raw, stating that despite the news about WWE (referencing Endeavor's purchase), nothing would change with the product, after which, he introduced Undisputed WWE Universal Champion Roman Reigns, who was accompanied by Paul Heyman and Solo Sikoa. Cody Rhodes interrupted and said Reigns only won because of Sikoa and then challenged Reigns to a rematch, but Reigns declined. Rhodes then challenged Reigns and Sikoa to a tag team match later that night, and Reigns accepted. Heyman then issued a condition that Rhodes' partner was someone who competed at WrestleMania 39 but also that person could not challenge Reigns for his titles as long as Reigns was champion. Brock Lesnar answered, seemingly as Cody Rhodes' tag team partner. However, the match never occurred due to Lesnar viciously assaulting Rhodes before the match could begin. This eventually led to a match between Lesnar and Rhodes at Backlash, which Rhodes won. They had two more matches; at Night of Champions, Lesnar won when he made Rhodes pass out to the Kimura lock, and at SummerSlam, Rhodes was victorious. Afterwards, he was endorsed by Lesnar. Reigns and Rhodes then went face-to-face for the first time since the Raw after WrestleMania on the October 13 episode of SmackDown.

Rhodes then went on to win the men's Royal Rumble match at the 2024 Royal Rumble to earn a rematch against Reigns for the Undisputed WWE Universal Championship at WrestleMania XL. Despite involvement from The Rock and Seth Rollins, Rhodes defeated Reigns in a rematch in the main event of WrestleMania XL Night 2 to become the new Undisputed WWE Universal Champion.

Also on Raw, Rey Mysterio talked about his win over his son, Dominik, only for United States Champion Austin Theory to interrupt. This led to a non-title match immediately afterwards, where Theory was victorious after interference from Dominik. After the match, Dominik's Judgment Day stablemate Damian Priest attacked Bad Bunny, who was seated at ringside, and chokeslammed him through an announce table. On the April 24 episode, Bad Bunny returned and announced that although he was originally to be the host of Backlash, he would instead be facing Priest in a street fight at the event.

=== SmackDown ===
On the following SmackDown, Sami Zayn still felt as if he could get through to Jey Uso and faced him in the main event of SmackDown. Prior to the match backstage, Kevin Owens was attacked backstage by Solo Sikoa. Jey defeated Zayn after interference from Sikoa. Afterwards, Sikoa continued to attack Zayn until Jey stopped him only to attack Zayn himself. Matt Riddle then made the save due to his past history with The Bloodline, as Sikoa had sidelined Riddle back in December (kayfabe). The following week, Zayn and Owens' promo was interrupted by The Usos (Jey and Jimmy Uso) and Sikoa. Afterwards, a brawl broke out, with Zayn, Owens, and Riddle standing tall. On April 17, a six-man tag team match pitting The Bloodline (The Usos and Sikoa) against Riddle, Zayn, and Owens was scheduled for Backlash. It was also announced that Zayn and Owens would defend the Undisputed WWE Tag Team Championship against The Usos in a rematch on the April 28 episode, where Owens and Zayn retained.

Also on SmackDown, Triple H announced that the WWE Draft would be returning. The dates for the 2023 draft were revealed the following week, beginning on the April 28 episode of SmackDown and concluding with the May 1 episode of Raw. Draft results went into effect with the Raw after Backlash on May 8.

During the draft, Asuka and Raw Women's Champion Bianca Belair were drafted to SmackDown. On the May 12 episode of SmackDown, Asuka spat green mist to Belair. This set up a championship rematch between the two for Night of Champions.

Also on SmackDown, The Brawling Brutes (Sheamus, Ridge Holland, and Butch) defeated Imperium (Intercontinental Champion Gunther, Ludwig Kaiser, and Giovanni Vinci) in a six-man tag team match. Imperium and Drew McIntyre were then drafted to Raw during the 2023 WWE Draft. McIntyre returned at Money in the Bank, where he attacked Gunther after the latter's successful title defense. This led to a title match between McIntyre and Gunther at SummerSlam, where Gunther retained.

== Results ==
Night 1
No.	Results	Stipulations	Times
1	Austin Theory (c) defeated John Cena by pinfall	Singles match for the WWE United States Championship	11:20
2	The Street Profits (Angelo Dawkins and Montez Ford) defeated Braun Strowman and Ricochet, Alpha Academy (Chad Gable and Otis), and The Viking Raiders (Erik and Ivar) (with Valhalla) by pinfall	Men's WrestleMania Showcase fatal four-way tag team match	8:30
3	Seth "Freakin" Rollins defeated Logan Paul (with KSI) (Note: KSI had accompanied Logan Paul to the ring disguised as a Prime bottle; his identity was unveiled midway through the match.) by pinfall	Singles match	16:15
4	Trish Stratus, Lita, and Becky Lynch defeated Damage CTRL (Bayley, Dakota Kai, and Iyo Sky) by pinfall	Six-woman tag team match	14:40
5	Rey Mysterio defeated Dominik Mysterio by pinfall	Singles match	14:55
6	Rhea Ripley defeated Charlotte Flair (c) by pinfall	Singles match for the WWE SmackDown Women's Championship	23:35
7	Pat McAfee defeated The Miz by pinfall	Singles match	3:40
8	Kevin Owens and Sami Zayn defeated The Usos (Jey Uso and Jimmy Uso) (c) by pinfall	Tag team match for the Undisputed WWE Tag Team Championship (Note: The name "Undisputed WWE Tag Team Championship" referred to both the Raw Tag Team Championship and SmackDown Tag Team Championship being held and defended together, although both titles remained independently active.)	24:15
(c) / – the champion(s) heading into the match

Night 2
No.	Results	Stipulations	Times
1	Brock Lesnar defeated Omos (with MVP) by pinfall	Singles match	4:55
2	Ronda Rousey and Shayna Baszler defeated Liv Morgan and Raquel Rodriguez, Natalya and Shotzi, and Chelsea Green and Sonya Deville by submission	Women's WrestleMania Showcase fatal four-way tag team match	8:25
3	Gunther (c) defeated Drew McIntyre and Sheamus by pinfall	Triple threat match for the WWE Intercontinental Championship	16:40
4	Bianca Belair (c) defeated Asuka by pinfall	Singles match for the WWE Raw Women's Championship	16:05
5	Snoop Dogg defeated The Miz by pinfall (Note: The match originally had Shane McMahon facing The Miz, but after McMahon legitimately tore his quadriceps while the match was in progress, Snoop inserted himself as McMahon's replacement.)	Singles match	2:20
6	Edge defeated "The Demon" Finn Bálor by pinfall	Hell in a Cell match	18:10
7	Roman Reigns (c) (with Paul Heyman and Solo Sikoa) defeated Cody Rhodes by pinfall	Singles match for the Undisputed WWE Universal Championship (Note: The name "Undisputed WWE Universal Championship" referred to both the WWE Championship and Universal Championship being held and defended together, although both titles remained independently active.)	34:35
(c) / – the champion(s) heading into the match
