= TKO Group Holdings =

American sports and entertainment promoter

TKO Group Holdings, Inc.

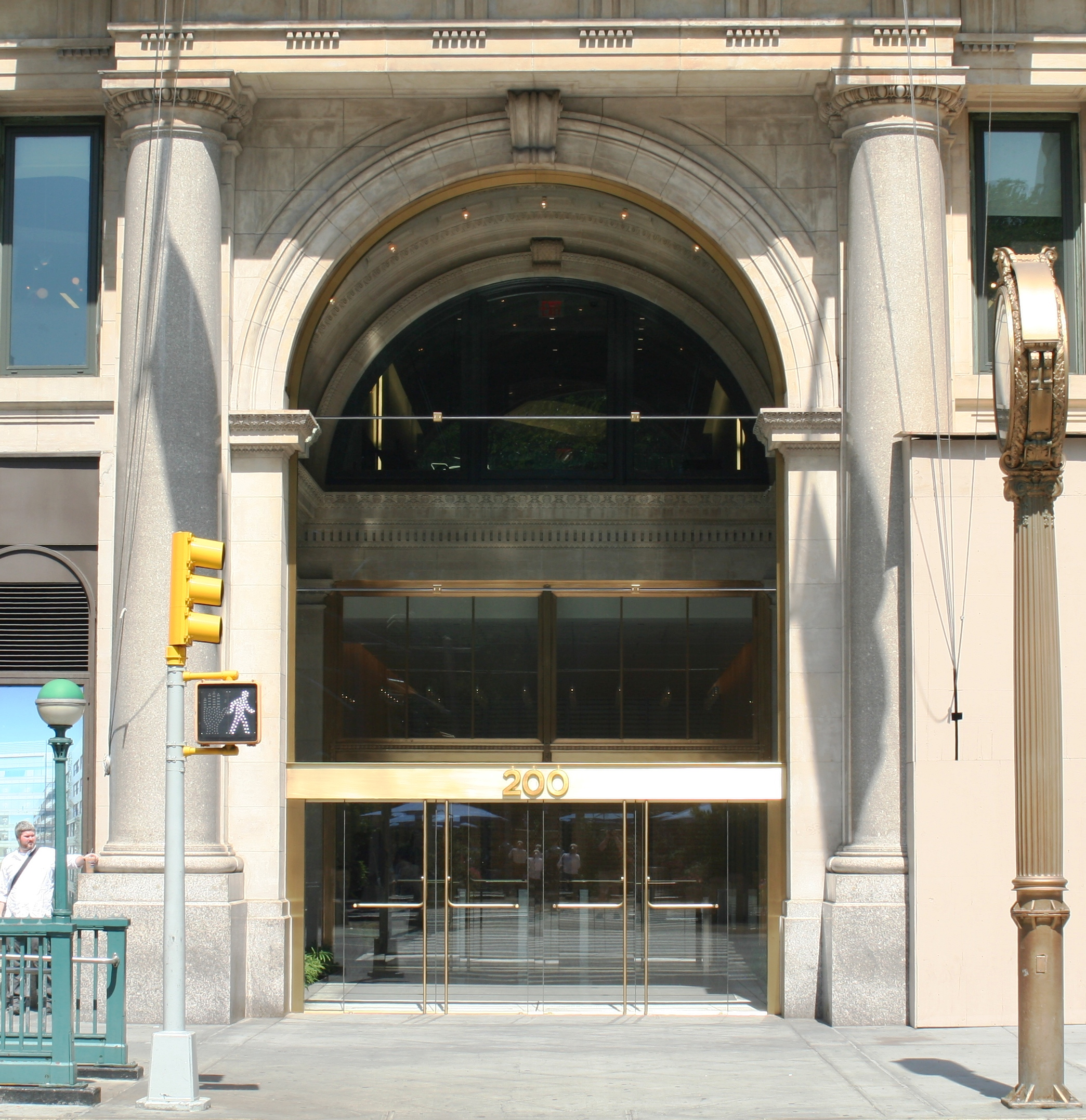
- TKO Group Holdings headquarters at the Toy Center in Manhattan, New York
- Trade name: TKO
- Type: Public
- Traded as: NYSE: TKO (Class A); S&P 500 component
- Industry: Experiential hospitality; Mass media; Sports entertainment; Sport management; Sports marketing; Sports promotion
- Predecessors: World Wrestling Entertainment, Inc.; Zuffa, LLC
- Founded: September 12, 2023; 3 years ago
- Founders: Ari Emanuel; Vince McMahon
- Headquarters: 200 Fifth Avenue, New York City, New York, United States
- Area served: Worldwide
- Key people: Ari Emanuel (Executive Chairman and CEO); Mark Shapiro (President and COO)
- Products: Broadcasting; Films; Finance; Home video; Live events; Merchandise; Music; Publishing; Streaming network service; Television
- Services: Licensing
- Revenue: ▲US$4.735 billion (2025)
- Net income: ▲US$195.4 million (2025)
- Number of employees: c. 4,000 (2025)
- Parent: WME Group (63.9%)
- Subsidiaries: IMG; On Location (Note: Also known as On Location Events and On Location Experiences.); PBR; UFC; WWE; Zuffa Boxing (40%)
- Website: tkogrp.com

TKO Group Holdings, Inc. (TKO) is an American sports and entertainment company. Established on September 12, 2023, the public company was formed by a merger between Endeavor subsidiary Zuffa—the parent company of the Ultimate Fighting Championship (UFC), a mixed martial arts promotion—and the professional wrestling promotion WWE.

TKO's CEO is Ari Emanuel and president Mark Shapiro, both of Endeavor; Dana White and Nick Khan retained their roles as CEOs of UFC and WWE, respectively after the merger. WWE co-founder Vince McMahon served as executive chairman until resigning from the company in January 2024 amid a sex trafficking scandal. The merger marked the first time that WWE has not been solely and primarily majority-controlled by the McMahon family, which founded the company and owned it for over 70 years.

As of 2024, the UFC and WWE were the two most valuable combat sports organizations in the world according to Forbes. UFC was listed as the most valued mixed martial arts (MMA) company with a revenue of $1.406 billion and WWE is the most valued professional wrestling promotion with a revenue of $1.398 billion in 2023.

In 2025, TKO announced plans to form a boxing promotion known as Zuffa Boxing and acquire other sports and entertainment assets from Endeavor as part of Endeavor's sale to Silver Lake Partners, including Professional Bull Riders (PBR), hospitality agency On Location, and assets from IMG.

== Background ==
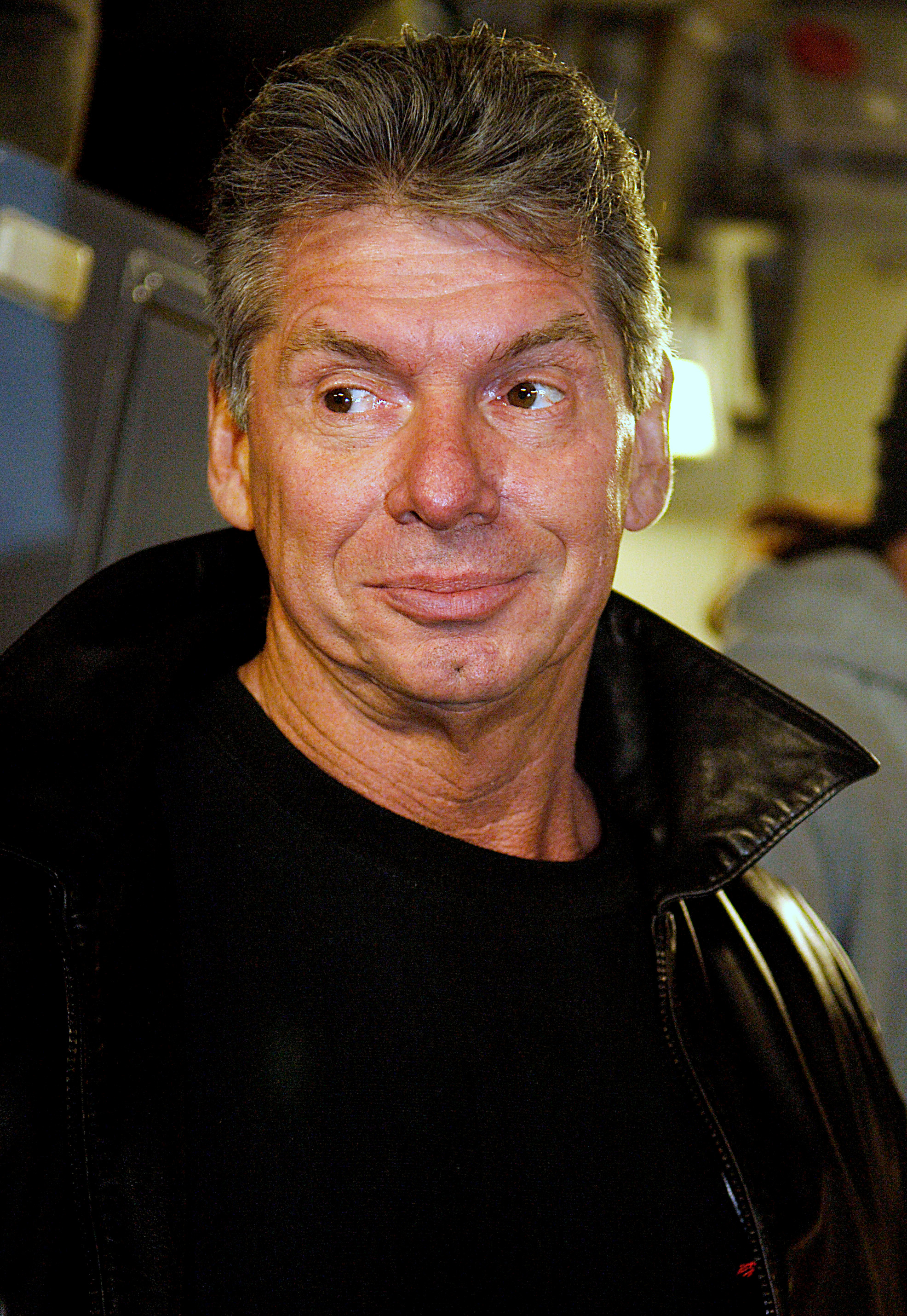
Vince McMahon, a third-generation wrestling promoter and co-founder of Titan Sports, Inc., originally served as Executive Chairman of TKO Group Holdings.

WWE was founded in 1953 as the Capitol Wrestling Corporation (CWC), a Northeastern territory of the National Wrestling Alliance (NWA). The CWC was run by Vincent J. McMahon, son of boxing and wrestling promoter Jess McMahon. Following a booking dispute over CWC wrestler Buddy Rogers and the NWA World Heavyweight Championship, the CWC left the NWA and became the World Wide Wrestling Federation (WWWF) in January 1963, and by April 25, 1963, Rogers was declared the first WWWF World Heavyweight Champion. The WWWF was renamed to the World Wrestling Federation (WWF) in 1979; the WWF made its final departure from the NWA in 1983. The legal entity, which was originally named Titan Sports, Inc., was incorporated on February 21, 1980, in South Yarmouth, Massachusetts; it was reincorporated under Delaware General Corporation Law in 1987. Titan Sports was co-founded by Vincent K. McMahon, Vincent J.'s son, and his wife Linda. It acquired Capitol Wrestling Corporation Ltd., the holding company for the WWF, in 1982. After buying the WWF, Vince McMahon expanded the promotion by overturning the NWA's territory system and holding events around the United States and the world which were televised on a global basis. As part of the 1980s professional wrestling boom, the WWF began to capitalize on the popularity of rising star Hulk Hogan after he defeated The Iron Sheik at Madison Square Garden on January 23, 1984 to capture the WWF World Heavyweight Championship. On March 31, 1985, the WWF held WrestleMania I, the first edition of WrestleMania, which went on to become WWF's flagship event. Initially broadcast on closed-circuit television, WrestleMania became a pay-per-view the following year, as the WWF expanded its pay-per-view offerings and became known as a pioneer for the relatively new distribution format.

In January 1993, the WWF introduced Monday Night Raw as its live weekly episodic television show. The WWF became a publicly traded company in August 1999, launching an initial public offering on the New York Stock Exchange. The company's status as the world's premier professional wrestling organization was cemented by its acquisition of the assets of World Championship Wrestling in 2001 following the Monday Night War. Titan Sports was renamed World Wrestling Federation Entertainment, Inc. in 1999, and then World Wrestling Entertainment, Inc. in 2002 after a legal dispute with the World Wildlife Fund. Since 2011, the company has branded itself solely with the initials WWE, though the legal name did not change at the time.

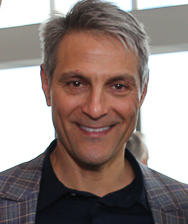
Ari Emanuel, executive chair and CEO of TKO Group Holdings

WWE's majority owner was its executive chairman, third-generation wrestling promoter Vince McMahon, who retained a 38.6% ownership of the company's outstanding stock and 81.1% of the voting power before the merger. The closure of the merger saw McMahon's voting power and stock ownership dramatically decrease after selling the majority of his stocks. The Ultimate Fighting Championship (UFC), initially under the ownership of the Semaphore Entertainment Group, was founded by American businessman Art Davie and Brazilian martial artist Rorion Gracie with their partners in WOW Promotions. UFC 1 was held in November 12, 1993, at the McNichols Sports Arena in Denver. The purpose of the early ultimate fighting competitions was to identify the most effective martial art in a contest with minimal rules and no weight classes between competitors of different fighting disciplines. In subsequent events, more rigorous rules were created and fighters began adopting effective techniques from more than one discipline, which indirectly helped create a separate style of fighting known as present-day mixed martial arts (MMA). In April 1995, after UFC 5, Davie and Gracie sold their remaining interest in the UFC to the Semaphore Entertainment Group and disbanded WOW Promotions.

In 2001, Zuffa, a sports promotion company headed by Frank and Lorenzo Fertitta, purchased the UFC from the Semaphore Entertainment Group. Zuffa's ownership led to a growth period for the company and the sport of MMA in general; the UFC's global leadership in the sport led to Zuffa buying the assets of the Pride Fighting Championships in 2007 and the Strikeforce promotion in 2011 (among other MMA promotions). In July 2016, Zuffa was sold to a group led by Endeavor, then known as William Morris Endeavor (WME–IMG), including Silver Lake Partners, Kohlberg Kravis Roberts, and MSD Capital, for US$4.025 billion. In 2017, WME–IMG changed its holding name to Endeavor. In 2021, Endeavor bought out Zuffa's other owners at a valuation of $1.7 billion.

== History ==
=== WWE's preparations for a sale ===
On June 17, 2022, amid allegations of misconduct, Vince McMahon stepped down as the chairman and CEO of WWE, leaving the company to his daughter, Stephanie McMahon, and Nick Khan. In January 2023, Vince said he planned to return to WWE ahead of media rights negotiations. WWE's media rights with Fox and USA Network were set to expire in 2024. Also in January 2023, J.P. Morgan & Co. was hired to handle a possible sale of the company, with rumored suitors including Comcast and Fox Corporation (owners of WWE's broadcast partners USA Network and Fox), The Walt Disney Company (owners of ESPN), Warner Bros. Discovery (media partners of All Elite Wrestling), Netflix, Amazon, Endeavor (WWE had an existing business relationship with its subsidiary Endeavor Streaming, which took over the technical operations of its streaming service WWE Network in 2019), Liberty Media, Creative Artists Agency, and Saudi Arabia's Public Investment Fund (WWE has a long-term agreement with Saudi Arabia's Ministry of Sport to promote events in the country). On January 10, 2023, Stephanie McMahon resigned as WWE's chairwoman and co-CEO, after which Vince McMahon assumed the role of executive chairman of WWE while Nick Khan became the sole CEO.

=== Formation ===
In September 2023, Endeavor Group Holdings, UFC, and WWE formed a new publicly traded company, TKO Group Holdings, Inc. The new entity went public on September 12, 2023 and is listed on the New York Stock Exchange (NYSE) under the symbol "TKO". At the close of the deal, Endeavor held a 51% stake in TKO Group Holdings, with WWE's shareholders having a 49% stake, valuing WWE at $9.3 billion. This marked the first time that WWE had not been majority-controlled by members of the McMahon family. Endeavor CEO Ari Emanuel became CEO of TKO and Mark Shapiro became president and chief operating officer, with each maintaining their respective roles at Endeavor. UFC and WWE continued to operate as separate divisions under TKO, with Dana White as CEO of the UFC and Nick Khan serving as president of WWE post-merger. WWE's head of creative Paul Levesque remained in his role.

When the merger was first announced in April 2023, Emanuel stated that it would "bring together two leading pureplay sports and entertainment companies" and provide "significant operating synergies". McMahon stated that "family businesses have to evolve for all the right reasons", and that "given the incredible work that Ari and Endeavor have done to grow the UFC brand — nearly doubling its revenue over the past seven years — and the immense success we've already had in partnering with their team on a number of ventures, I believe that this is without a doubt the best outcome for our shareholders and other stakeholders." The merger closed on September 12, 2023; with Vince McMahon personally owning approximately one-third of the Class A Common Stock of TKO Group Holdings, Inc. The first television show produced under the TKO banner was the September 12 episode of WWE NXT. Following the merger, Dana White was made CEO of UFC.

In January 2024, a lawsuit was filed by Janel Grant, a former employee at WWE headquarters between 2019 and 2022 against WWE as well as TKO (by proxy of ownership). Grant alleged that the then current TKO Executive Chairman Vince McMahon, had coerced her into a sexual relationship, and, along with WWE executive John Laurinaitis and a WWE wrestler who was also a former UFC fighter, (Note: The WWE/UFC talent in question was not named in the lawsuit but was believed to be by The Wall Street Journal as Brock Lesnar.) sexually trafficked her and repeatedly sexually assaulted her between 2020–2021. Grant alleged that she was subjected to "extreme cruelty and degradation" by McMahon, including being defecated upon during a sexual encounter. Grant stated that McMahon had agreed to pay her $3 million in 2022 in return for a NDA but stopped paying after only $1 million had been paid following the initial public emergence of the sexual misconduct allegations the same year. Federal prosecutors have subpoenaed McMahon, and have taken up the filing in question. On January 26, 2024, one day after the report, Vince McMahon resigned from TKO. In a statement, McMahon said the decision was made "out of respect for the WWE Universe, the extraordinary TKO business and its board members and shareholders, partners and constituents, and all of the employees".

=== Further investments and acquisitions ===
In July 2024, TKO Group announced an investment in EverPass Media, an NFL-backed distributor of streaming pay television content to commercial establishments. Shapiro joined the company's board of directors. On October 23, 2024, it was announced that TKO Group would acquire several businesses from Endeavor, including sports and event management firm IMG (aside from "businesses associated with the IMG brand in licensing, models, and tennis representation, nor IMG's full events portfolio"), On Location (a luxury hospitality agency focused on major sporting events), and Professional Bull Riders (PBR), for $3.25 billion in an all-stock deal that closed in 2025. Shapiro stated that Silver Lake Partners had requested the divestment of certain Endeavor assets as part of its planned buyout of the company, and that Endeavor had approached TKO Group with an offer. He explained that TKO was interested in league ownership and "businesses that can power our current sports ecosystem", while the company stated that it would "[expand] TKO's operational footprint in the fast-growing premium sports market and enables direct participation in the upside from partner leagues and events." Under the terms of the deal, Endeavor will own 59% of TKO and the remaining shareholders will control the other 41%. The sale was officially completed on February 28, 2025. To promote the acquisition, TKO staged a series of consecutive PBR, UFC, and WWE events billed as "TKO Takeover" on April 24, 26, and 28, at T-Mobile Center in Kansas City, consisting of a PBR team knockout event, a UFC on ESPN card, and WWE Raw respectively.

On March 5, 2025, TKO announced a partnership with Turki Al-Sheikh, the chairman of the Saudi General Entertainment Authority, and Saudi entertainment conglomerate Sela to launch a new boxing promotion in 2026. On April 19, 2025, it was announced that via WWE, TKO would acquire the Mexican professional wrestling promotion Lucha Libre AAA Worldwide in a joint venture with Fillip, a Mexican sports and entertainment company. The sale is expected to close in the third quarter of 2025, with TKO holding a 51% controlling stake. On June 6, 2025, TKO announced the creation of UFC Brazilian Jiu-Jitsu (UFC BJJ), a sister company to the UFC based on submission grappling. UFC BJJ was described by the UFC as "the world’s new premier Brazilian Jiu-Jitsu live event series". On June 23, 2025, Ring Magazine officially announced that TKO's boxing promotion (earlier announced in March 2025 in partnership with Turki Al-Sheikh and Sela) will be known as Zuffa Boxing. Zuffa Boxing's inaugural event, Álvarez vs. Crawford: Once In A Lifetime, took place on September 13, 2025 at the Allegiant Stadium. On September 29, 2025, it was announced that Zuffa Boxing had signed a media rights agreement with Paramount Skydance for their events to air on the Paramount+ streaming platform; the promotion will air 12 events yearly on the streaming platform with the potential of simulcasts on CBS.

== Ownership ==
As of April 2026, the ownership structure of TKO Group Holdings consists of over ten groups and individuals.

- The WME Group (via Silver Lake) – 63.9%
- WWE shareholders – 36.1%
  - Various stockholders – 24.2%
  - McMahon family – 4.6%
    - Vince McMahon – 3.4%
    - Stephanie McMahon – 1.0%
    - Linda McMahon – 0.2%
  - State Street Corporation – 2.6%
  - BlackRock – 2.3%
  - Morgan Stanley – 2.2%
  - All TKO board members – 0.4%

== Corporate governance ==
The board of directors of TKO Group Holdings initially consisted of eleven members. On January 23, 2024, the TKO board of directors would be increased from eleven members to thirteen members. Following this, WWE underwent some changes, which included broadcast deals with different partners (including Netflix) and giving up ownership of Dwayne Johnson's trademarked name "The Rock" to Johnson, who would also join TKO's board of directors. The board of directors shrank to twelve members on January 26, 2024 after board of directors member and Executive Chairman Vince McMahon resigned from TKO following sex trafficking and sexual assault allegations involving a former WWE employee.

Board of Directors
Name	Representative	Role
Ari Emanuel	WME	CEO and Executive Chairman of TKO Group Holdings
Egon Durban	WME	Co-CEO of Silver Lake Management
Nick Khan	WWE	President of WWE
Steve Koonin	WWE	Lead Independent Director; CEO of Atlanta Hawks
Jonathan Kraft	WME	President of the Kraft Group and the New England Patriots
Sonya Medina Williams	WME	President and Executive Director for Reach Resilience
Mark Shapiro	WME	President and COO of TKO Group Holdings
Carrie A. Wheeler	WWE	CEO of Opendoor
Nancy Tellem	WME	Chief Media Officer of Eko
Peter Bynoe	WWE	Senior Advisor of DLA Piper
Dwayne Johnson	WWE	Co-owner of United Football League; Part-time WWE wrestler
Brad Keywell	WME	Executive Chairman of Uptake Technologies

== Assets ==
- World Wrestling Entertainment (WWE) is a professional wrestling and sports entertainment organization, producing weekly programming including Monday Night Raw, Friday Night SmackDown, and NXT as well as the annual WrestleMania signature event. The division is led by Nick Khan and Paul Levesque.
  - WWE Studios is a subsidiary that creates and develops feature film properties, including scripted, non-scripted, family, and animated television and digital content.
  - WWE Music Group is a music label specializing in compilation albums of WWE wrestlers' entrance themes and music performed by WWE talent.
  - WWE Performance Center is WWE's official professional wrestling training facility, located in Orlando, Florida, serving as the home base of WWE's developmental system.
  - Lucha Libre AAA Worldwide (AAA) (51%) is a Mexican professional wrestling promotion acquired by WWE in a joint venture with Fillip in 2025, with TKO, through WWE, holding a 51% controlling stake.
- Ultimate Fighting Championship (UFC) is a mixed martial arts organization, producing more than 40 live events annually worldwide. The division is led by Dana White and Hunter Campbell.
  - UFC Fight Pass is the UFC's digital subscription streaming service, broadcasting live events, original series, and a library of combat sports content.
  - UFC Brazilian Jiu-Jitsu is a Brazilian jiu-jitsu and submission grappling promotion launched in June 2025 as a sister company to the UFC.
  - UFC Gym is a chain of fitness centers and martial arts gyms operating under a franchise model.
  - Ultimate Fighting Productions, LLC produces the UFC's long-running reality television series, The Ultimate Fighter, which is used to discover new MMA talent, as well as other reality television and combat sports shows like The Ultimate Surfer, Power Slap: Road to the Title, and UFC BJJ: Road to the Title.
- Professional Bull Riders (PBR) is a bull riding organization, promoting more than 200 global events annually. The division is led by Sean Gleason.
  - American Bucking Bull is an organization dedicated to the registration of bucking bulls and establishing the American Bucking Bull as a documented breed of cattle. American Bucking Bull is owned by PBR and various stock contractors.
- Zuffa Boxing (40%) is TKO's professional boxing promotion, established as a joint venture with Sela. The division is led by Dana White and Turki Al-Sheikh.
- IMG is a global sports marketing agency servicing more than 200 rights holders including The R&A (The Open Championship), the All England Lawn Tennis Club (Wimbledon), the International Olympic Committee, the National Hockey League, Major League Soccer, and the ATP and WTA Tours across media rights, production, brand partnerships, digital content, and event management. The division is led by Adam Kelly.
- On Location is a premium experiential hospitality firm, offering ticketing, curated guest experiences, live event production, and travel management across sports, entertainment, fashion, and culture. On Location serves as an official partner and/or service provider to over 150 rights holders, including the Olympic Movement (the Milano Cortina 2026 and Los Angeles 2028 Olympic Games), FIFA (FIFA World Cup 26), the NFL (Super Bowl), the NCAA (Final Four), UFC, WWE, and the PGA of America. The division is led by Paul Caine.

== See also ==
- Boxing in the United States
- Mixed martial arts in the United States
- Professional wrestling in the United States
