= McMahon family =

Irish-American business family

McMahon
- Current region: Connecticut and New York, U.S.
- Origin: County Galway, Ireland
- Members: Vincent K. McMahon; Linda McMahon; Shane McMahon; Stephanie McMahon; Paul "Triple H" Levesque (via marriage to Stephanie McMahon)
- Connected members: Jess McMahon; Vincent J. McMahon

The McMahon family (/məkˈmæn/ mək-MAN) is an Irish-American family known for their ownership of WWE, the world's largest professional wrestling promotion. Vince McMahon, a third-generation wrestling promoter, was the chairman and chief executive officer (CEO) of WWE from 1982 until 2023. Shane McMahon is a fourth-generation professional wrestling promoter.

In April 2023, Vince McMahon sold WWE to Endeavor, the parent company of the Ultimate Fighting Championship (UFC). The sale was finalized in September 2023, resulting in the merger of WWE and UFC into TKO Group Holdings. Vince McMahon retired in January 2024 during a sex trafficking scandal. The McMahon family has also branched out into movie production (WWE Studios) and American football through the XFL. As of 2026, the McMahon family maintains its 5.35% ownership stake of TKO Group Holdings with Vince McMahon owning 4.06% of the company.

== History ==
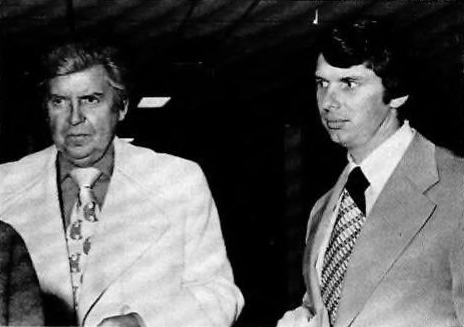
Vincent J. McMahon and Vincent K. McMahon, c. 1970s

The family's wrestling business started in 1915 when Jess McMahon (1882–1954), a descendant of the Thomond McMahon clan in Western Ireland, started promoting wrestling events. In 1953, Jess and his son, Vincent J. McMahon, founded the Capitol Wrestling Corporation, later renamed the World Wide Wrestling Federation, and then the World Wrestling Federation.

Vince J. McMahon Sr. married twice, first to Victoria Askew and then to Juanita Johnston. Upon his retirement in 1982, his son from his first marriage, Vince McMahon Jr., took over the business. Vince McMahon Jr. served as chairman and Chief Executive Officer of the company until July 2022, when he retired during a sex scandal investigation. On January 10, 2023 Vince McMahon Jr. was re-elected chairman. The company was renamed World Wrestling Entertainment, Inc. (WWE) in 2002 and Alpha Entertainment, LLC in 2017.

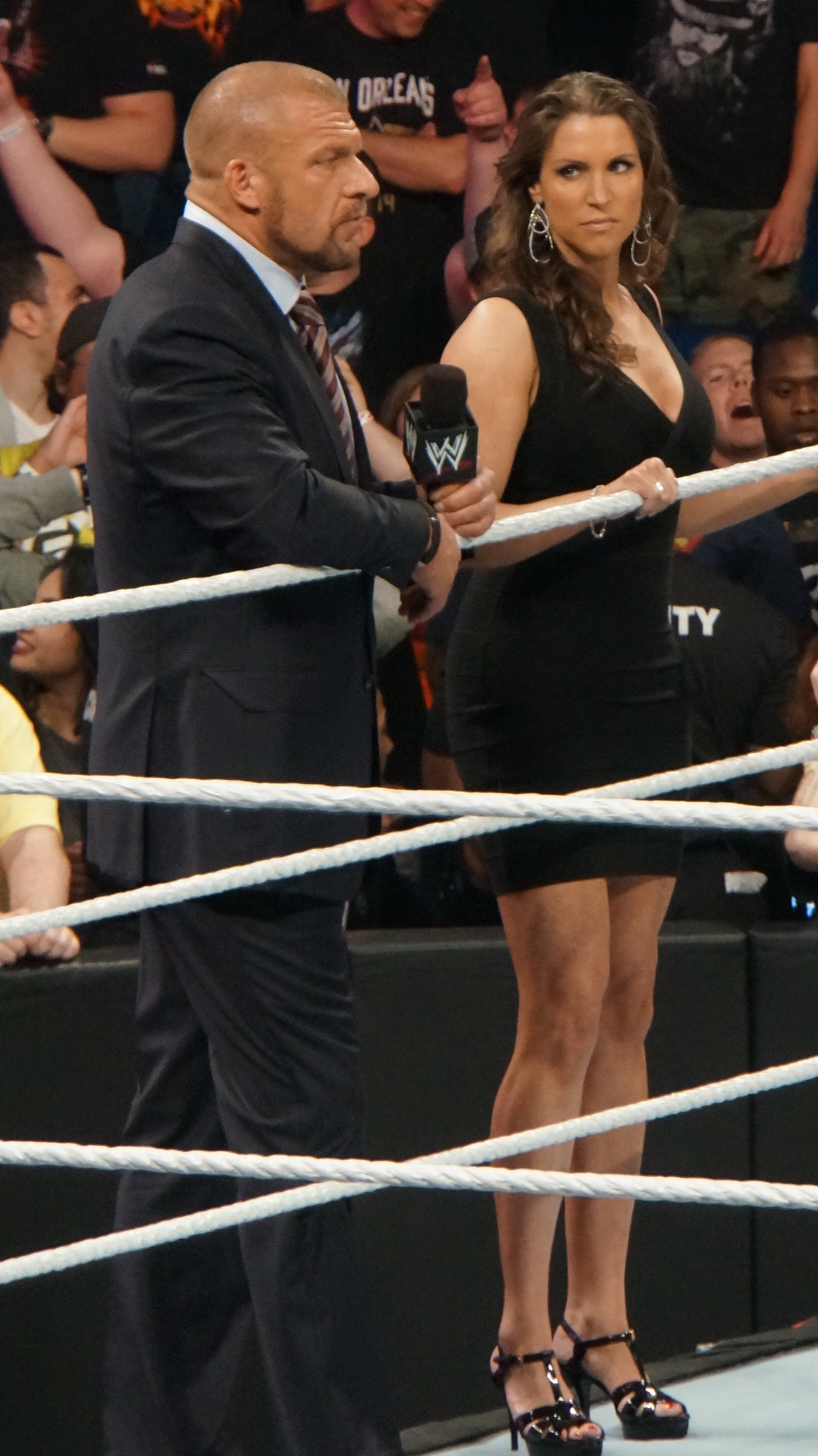
Paul "Triple H" Levesque and Stephanie McMahon in 2014

Vince and Linda McMahon have two children, Shane and Stephanie. Shane is married to Marissa Mazzola, and Stephanie is married to Paul Levesque, known as Triple H. Stephanie and Paul have three daughters: Aurora Rose, Murphy Claire, and Vaughn Evelyn. Shane and Marissa have three sons: Declan James, Kenyon Jesse, and Rogan Henry.

Linda McMahon stepped down as CEO of WWE to run for the United States Senate in Connecticut. Their son, Shane, left WWE in 2010 to become chairman and CEO of YOU On Demand Inc., a New York City-based company operating primarily in China. Shane returned to WWE in 2016 as an on-screen talent. Vince, Stephanie, and Shane were the only three members born into the McMahon family working under the brand as of 2021. As of June 2016, the WWE had a market cap of over $1.38 billion. In December 2016, Linda was nominated to be the Administrator of the Small Business Administration by President Donald Trump, and she held the position from 2017 to 2019.

In January 2023, speculation arose that WWE had been placed for sale. Hours before WrestleMania 39 Night two, CNBC reported via multiple sources that a deal between WWE and Endeavor, the parent company of Ultimate Fighting Championship (UFC), was imminent. The deal involved a merger of WWE with the UFC into a new publicly-traded company, with Endeavor holding a 51% stake. The sale was confirmed the next day, on April 3, 2023. WrestleMania 39 subsequently became the final WrestleMania event under McMahon family ownership, though Vince maintained his position as executive chairman of WWE. The sale was finalized on September 12, with 2023 Payback being the final major event produced by WWE under the McMahon family ownership. WWE and UFC subsequently became divisions under a new entity called TKO Group Holdings. By early 2024, Vince McMahon (no longer the majority stockholder in WWE) was removed due to a sex trafficking scandal involving a former employee.

== Family tree ==
Roderick McMahon (1844–1922)	Elizabeth Dowling (1846–1911)
Roderick James "Jess" McMahon (1882–1954)	Rose E. Davis (1891–1958)
Victoria H. Hanner (1920–2022)	Vincent James McMahon (1914–1984)	Juanita W. Johnston (1916–1998)
Vincent Kennedy McMahon (born 1945)	Linda Marie Edwards (born 1948)
Stephanie Marie McMahon (born 1976)	Paul Michael Levesque (born 1969)	Shane Brandon McMahon (born 1970)	Marissa Mazzola (born 1973)
Aurora Rose Levesque (born 2006)	Murphy Claire Levesque (born 2008)	Vaughn Evelyn Levesque (born 2010)	Declan James McMahon (born 2004)	Kenyon Jesse McMahon (born 2006)	Rogan Henry McMahon (born 2010)

== McMahon job titles ==
- Vince McMahon – former Executive Chairman of TKO Group Holdings; former chairman and CEO of WWE, minority owner of TKO Group Holdings
- Linda McMahon – Chair of America First Policy Institute, former SBA Administrator; former CEO of WWE; current United States Secretary of Education, minority owner of TKO Group Holdings
- Stephanie McMahon – former Chairwoman and former co-CEO of WWE; former Chief Brand Officer of WWE, minority owner of TKO Group Holdings
- Shane McMahon – former executive Vice Chairman of the Board of Directors of Ideanomics; former minority owner of WWE
- Paul "Triple H" Levesque – Chief Content Officer and Head of Creative of WWE

== See also ==
- List of family relations in professional wrestling
