= Nick Khan =

American business executive

- Born: Nick Walkers Willam Khan; 1974 (age 51–52); San Diego, California, U.S.
- Education: University of Nevada, Las Vegas (BA); Whittier Law School (JD)
- Occupations: Business executive, lawyer
- Years active: 1987 - Present
- Title: President of WWE; Former CEO of WWE
- Relatives: Nahnatchka Khan (sister)

Nicholas Khan (born 1974) is an American business executive and former talent agent. He is the President of WWE and is a member of TKO's board of directors, having formerly served as co-CEO of WWE alongside Stephanie McMahon.

== Early life and education ==
Nicholas Khan was born in 1974 to Iranian immigrant parents. He was raised in Las Vegas, Nevada, alongside his sister, Nahnatchka. Growing up, both siblings were fans of professional wrestler The Iron Sheik, and Khan worked as an usher at WrestleMania IX in 1993.

Khan earned a Bachelor of Arts from the University of Nevada, Las Vegas. In 2000, he appeared as a contestant on Wheel of Fortune, winning $16,650. He used his prize money to fund his graduate education, earning a Juris Doctor from Whittier Law School. After passing the bar examination, Khan practiced as an attorney for seven years.

== Career ==
=== ICM and CAA (2006–2020) ===
At the end of 2005, Khan joined Broder Webb Chervin Silbermann, where he launched their sports and news broadcaster division. He remained with them through their merger with ICM. In April 2012, Deadline exclusively announced Khan was looking to move to CAA, where he would bring his clients, including Keith Olbermann, Nancy Grace, Hannah Storm, John Anderson, Jim Lampley, Jalen Rose, Max Kellerman, and Freddie Roach.

In 2012, he joined the Creative Artists Agency, where he served as Co-Head of their TV department. While there, he represented high-profile clients including sports television hosts Colin Cowherd and Mike Greenberg. In 2013, while representing Tim Tebow after his release from the New England Patriots, Khan received an unsolicited call from Paul Levesque (Triple H), inquiring about the possibility of booking Tebow to work a match at the following year's WrestleMania XXX against The Big Show. While the plans never progressed, this marked the first time that the two had spoken, and they remained in contact. In 2019, he negotiated WWE's television rights deal with NBCUniversal.

=== WWE (2020–present) ===
In August 2020, it was announced that Khan would step down from his role as Co-Head of Television at CAA to take on a new role as President and Chief Revenue Officer of WWE, where he would report to Vince McMahon following the departures of Co-presidents George Barrios and Michelle Wilson.

On June 15, 2022, The Wall Street Journal reported that McMahon was the subject of an ongoing investigation into a $3 million hush-money settlement. McMahon announced his retirement one month later on July 20, 2022, which saw Khan and chairwoman Stephanie McMahon both appointed as Co-CEOs. In January 2023, one week after McMahon announced he was returning as chairman, Stephanie resigned from the position, leaving Khan as the sole Chief Executive Officer.

On April 3, 2023, WWE reached a deal with Endeavor Group Holdings, Inc. to merge with UFC's parent company, Zuffa, to create a new media conglomerate known as TKO Group Holdings. The merger was completed on September 12, 2023, when Endeavor, UFC, and WWE staff rang the bell on the NYSE to mark the debut of TKO's shares. In the merger, Khan was re-appointed as WWE President, with a seat on TKO's board of directors.

== Awards and accomplishments ==
- Variety
  - Variety500 Honoree (2021, 2022, 2023)
- Wrestling Observer Newsletter
  - Promoter of the Year (2023, 2024)
