= Vincent J. McMahon =

American professional wrestling promoter (1914–1984)

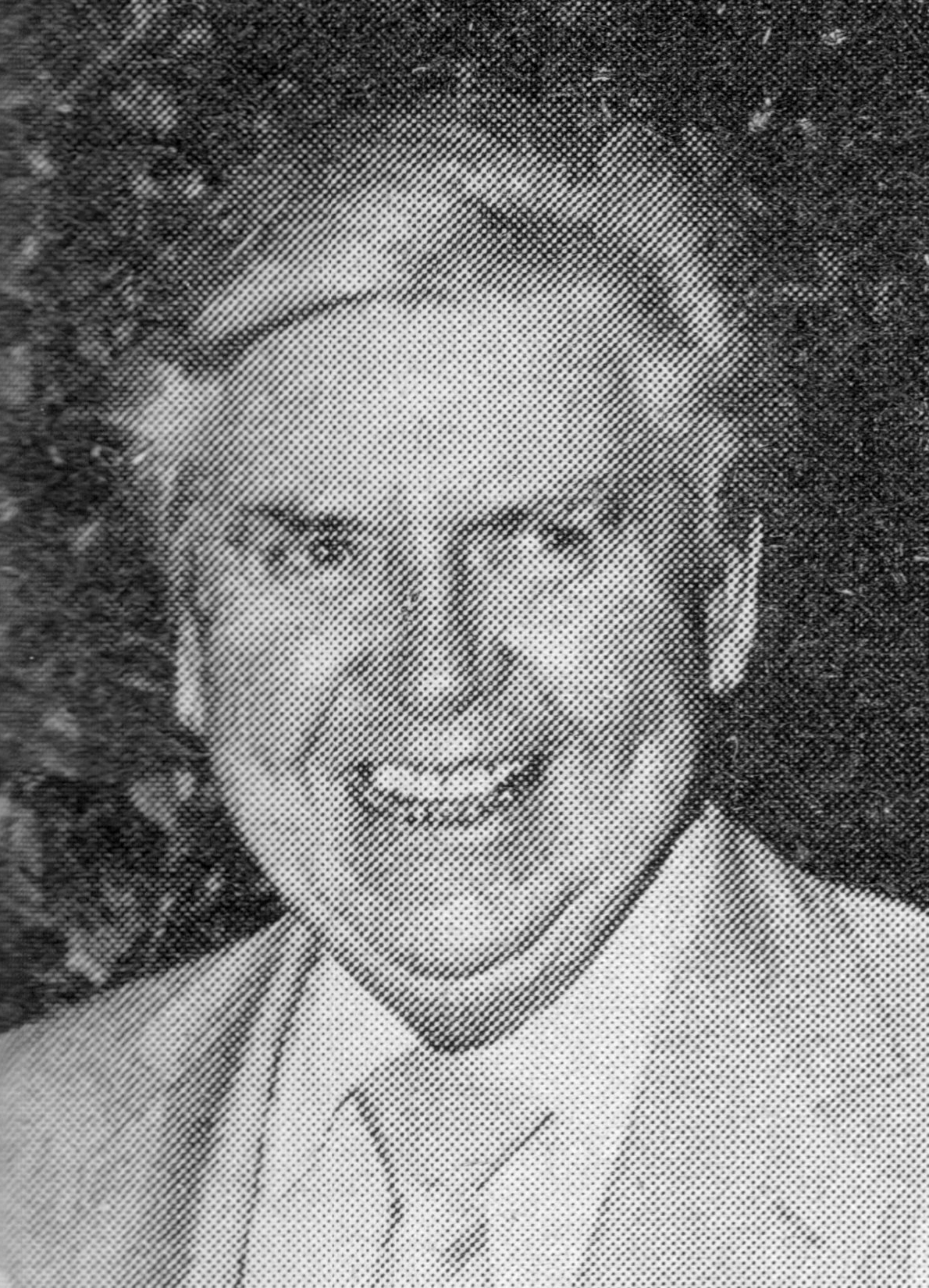
- McMahon in 1982
- Born: Vincent James McMahon; July 6, 1914; Harlem, New York, U.S.
- Died: May 24, 1984 (aged 69); Fort Lauderdale, Florida, U.S.
- Other name: Vince McMahon Sr.
- Occupation: Professional wrestling promoter
- Spouses: Victoria Hanner (m. 1939; div. 1946); Juanita Johnston (m. 1956)
- Children: Roderick James McMahon III; Vincent K. McMahon
- Parent(s): Jess McMahon; Rose Davis
- Family: McMahon

Vincent James McMahon (July 6, 1914 – May 24, 1984), also referred to as Vince McMahon Sr., was an American professional wrestling promoter. He is best known for running the Capitol Wrestling Corporation, later known as the World Wide Wrestling Federation and the World Wrestling Federation (and now known as WWE). His father, Jess McMahon, and his son Vincent K. McMahon were also professional wrestling promoters.

== Early life ==
Vincent James McMahon was born on July 6, 1914, in Harlem, New York to Rose (née Davis) and Roderick James "Jess" McMahon, a successful boxing, wrestling and concert promoter, who had worked with legendary Madison Square Garden promoter Tex Rickard. His parents were both of Irish descent. He had an older brother, Roderick James Jr., and a younger sister, Dorothy.

== Professional wrestling ==
McMahon saw the tremendous potential for growth that the professional wrestling industry had in the era following World War II, especially with the development of television and its need for new programming. Similar to boxing, wrestling took place primarily within a small ring and could be covered adequately by one or two cameras, and venues for it could readily be assembled in television studios, lessening production costs.

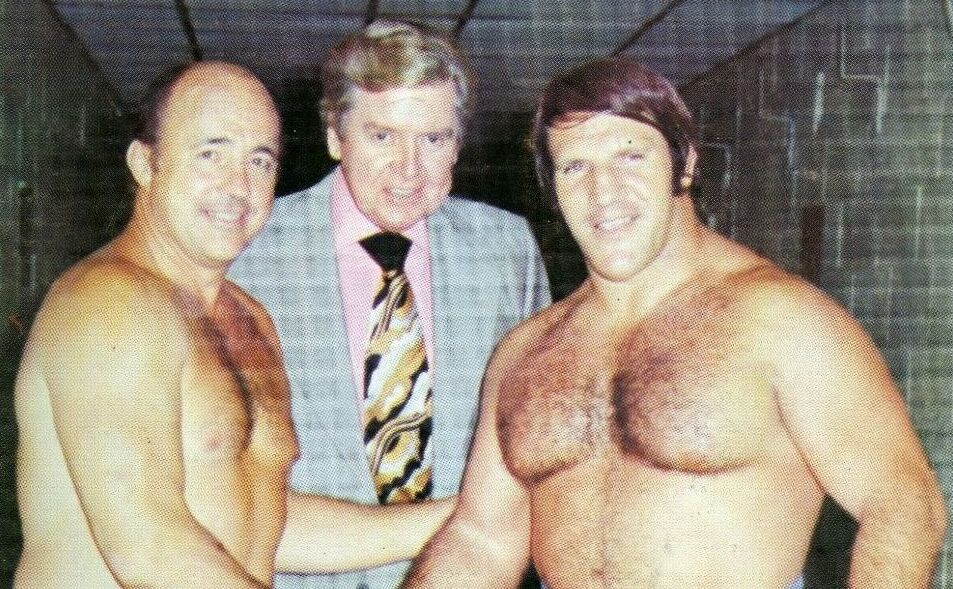
McMahon (center) with Verne Gagne and Bruno Sammartino in 1975

McMahon's group, the Capitol Wrestling Corporation, which was later renamed World Wide Wrestling Federation (WWWF) and the World Wrestling Federation (WWF), came to dominate professional wrestling in the 1950s and 1960s in the nation's most populous area, the Northeast. His control was primarily in Baltimore, New York, and New Jersey. Despite its name, the WWWF was, like all professional wrestling promotions of that era, mostly a regional operation. It was however the one that came to dominate the most lucrative region. In 1956, McMahon began airing his matches on television on Wednesday nights on the DuMont Network. The telecast originated from an old barn in Washington, D.C. It was one of the struggling network's last live sports telecasts before it went out of business the following year; however, WABD, DuMont's flagship station in New York (Now Fox-owned WNYW), kept the show after becoming an independent station, airing wrestling on Saturday nights until 1971.

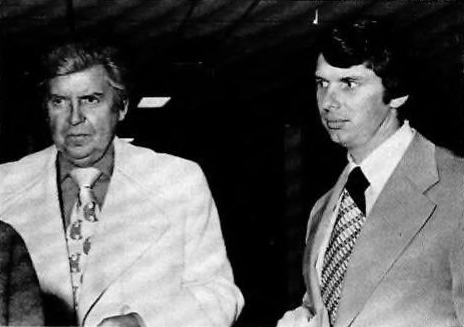
McMahon (left) with his son Vincent K. McMahon, c. 1970s

In her biography, wrestler The Fabulous Moolah claimed that McMahon was one of the first promoters to split gate proceeds with his wrestlers. Unlike his son, McMahon believed that the job of a promoter should be kept backstage or behind the scenes and should never interfere with the action in the ring. As a result, McMahon almost never came down to the squared circle. He can however clearly be seen standing ringside during the infamous Madison Square Garden "Alley Fight" between Sgt. Slaughter and Pat Patterson. Though McMahon appeared in the movie The Wrestler in a cast that was dominated by contemporary wrestlers, he believed that wrestlers should remain wrestlers and not branch off into other forms of media. Accordingly, he disapproved of Hulk Hogan's appearance in Rocky III in 1982, leading to Hogan's temporary departure from the WWF for Verne Gagne's American Wrestling Association. When his son purchased the WWF, he felt differently than his father on the issue. He rehired Hogan as his top star and avidly supported wrestlers branching out into other fields, as well as cross-promotions with various musicians, actors, and other personalities outside of wrestling.

In 1982, McMahon sold the parent company of the World Wrestling Federation to his son Vincent K. McMahon and his company Titan Sports, Inc. His son, much to his father's initial concern, set out to make the WWF national and eventually worldwide in scope. "Had my father known what I was going to do", the younger McMahon told Sports Illustrated in 1991, "he never would have sold his stock to me." The younger McMahon's competitive tactics were successful, and the WWF quickly became the most prominent exponent of "sports entertainment". His son Vince has been at the helm of the McMahon family promotion, which since 2002 has been called World Wrestling Entertainment (WWE). McMahon's grandchildren Shane and Stephanie used to work for the WWF/WWE. McMahon was posthumously inducted into the WWF Hall of Fame Class of 1996, by his grandson, Shane.

== Personal life and death ==
McMahon had two sons with his first wife Victoria "Vicky" H. Askew (née Hanner; 1920–2022): Roderick James "Rod" McMahon III (1943–2021) and Vincent K. McMahon (born 1945). He married his second wife, Juanita Wynne Johnston (1916–1998), and the couple retired to Fort Lauderdale, Florida. McMahon would not live to see his company grow from a territorial promotion to what is now a worldwide organization. On May 24, 1984, McMahon died at age 69 from pancreatic cancer. McMahon and his wife Juanita are buried at Our Lady Queen of Heaven Catholic Cemetery in Fort Lauderdale.

== Awards and accomplishments ==
- Madison Square Garden
  - Madison Square Garden Hall of Fame (Class of 1984)
- Professional Wrestling Hall of Fame and Museum
  - Class of 2004
- World Wrestling Federation
  - WWF Hall of Fame (Class of 1996)
- Wrestling Observer Newsletter
  - Wrestling Observer Newsletter Hall of Fame (Class of 1996)

== See also ==
- List of people from Harlem
