= Jess McMahon =

American wrestling and boxing promoter (1882–1954)

- Born: Roderick James McMahon; May 26, 1882; Manhattan, New York, U.S.
- Died: November 21, 1954 (aged 72); Wilkes-Barre, Pennsylvania, U.S.
- Education: Manhattan College
- Occupations: Professional boxing and wrestling promoter
- Spouse: Rose Davis (1891–1958) (m. 1912)
- Children: 3; including Vincent J.
- Family: McMahon

Roderick James "Jess" McMahon Sr. (May 26, 1882 – November 21, 1954) was an American professional wrestling and professional boxing promoter, and patriarch of the McMahon family, founders of Capitol Wrestling Corporation, precursor to the present-day WWE.

== Early life ==
Roderick James McMahon was born on May 26, 1882, in Manhattan, New York, to hotel owner Roderick McMahon (1846–1922) and Elizabeth McMahon (1848–1911), from County Galway. His parents had recently moved from Ireland to New York City. He and his older siblings Lauretta (born 1876), Catharine (born 1878) and Edward (born 1880) attended Manhattan College. McMahon graduated with a commercial diploma at the age of 17. The McMahon brothers showed a higher interest in sports than in a banking career.

== Career ==
By 1909, the McMahon brothers were managing partners of the Olympic Athletic Club and bookers at the Empire Athletic Club and St. Nicholas Athletic Club, located in or near Harlem. Because of a loss of public interest in boxing, the two McMahons expanded their affairs in 1911, founding the New York Lincoln Giants, a black baseball team, which played at Olympic Field in Harlem. With a team that included five of the best black players in the nation (who the McMahons recruited away from teams in Chicago and Philadelphia), the Lincoln Giants dominated black and white opponents for three seasons. In 1914, financial difficulties forced them to sell the team; however, they retained the contracts of many of the players, and for three more years they operated another team, the Lincoln Stars, using Lenox Oval on 145th Street as a home field. Touring with the squad, McMahon and his brother ventured to Havana, Cuba, in 1915, where they co-promoted the fight between Jess Willard and then-champion Jack Johnson, scheduled for 45 rounds (Willard won by knockout in the 26th round).

In the 1930s, the McMahons operated the Commonwealth Casino, on East 135th Street in Harlem. Boxing was the primary attraction. The McMahons booked black fighters to cater to Harlem's growing black population; fights between blacks and whites drew the largest, racially mixed crowds. In 1922, they established a black professional basketball team, the Commonwealth Big 5, to try to attract patrons to the casino. For two years, the team defeated black and white opponents, including Harlem's other black professional team, the Rens. Sportswriters considered the Big 5 the best black team in the nation, although they could not defeat the dominant white team of the time, the Original Celtics. Despite their success, the Big 5 did not attract large crowds, and the McMahons shut the team down after the 1923/1924 season, leaving the Rens to become the dominant black team of the 1920s and 1930s.

After 1915, Jess anchored in Long Island, where he became the first McMahon to promote professional wrestling, at the Freeport Municipal Stadium. The wrestling wars led McMahon to ally himself with another independent faction, captained by Carlos Louis Henriquez. Together they booked the Coney Island and Brooklyn Sport Stadiums, with Carlos being the main fan favorite. The formation of "the Trust" calmed the New York territory enough to allow McMahon access to a larger pool of wrestlers. Among those wrestlers were Jim Browning, Hans Kampfer, Mike Romano and Everett Marshall. By 1937, wrestling's popularity was waning. However, while most bookers left the city for fresher ground, Jess dug in for the long haul. His contacts allowed him to freely trade wrestlers with promoters in Pennsylvania, New Jersey, Maryland and Connecticut. A perpetual force in Northeastern sports, McMahon may be more remembered for his spell as matchmaker at the Garden than for his 20 years as a wrestling promoter.

On January 7, 1953, the first show under the Capitol Wrestling Corporation (CWC) banner was produced. It is not certain who the founder of the CWC was. Some sources state that it was Jess' son Vincent J. McMahon while other sources (including the website of the CWC's successor, WWE) credit Jess himself as the founder of the CWC.

== Personal life and death ==
McMahon married a young New York City woman named Rose E. Davis in 1912 who was of Irish descent, and together they had three children: sons Roderick James Jr. and Vincent James, and daughter Dorothy. On November 22, 1954, as a result of a cerebral hemorrhage, Jess died at a hospital in Wilkes-Barre, Pennsylvania. Upon his death, his second son, Vincent, took over the business, eventually creating the World Wide Wrestling Federation promotion, known today as WWE.

== See also ==
- List of professional wrestling promoters
