= Chris Smith (filmmaker) =

American filmmaker (born 1970)

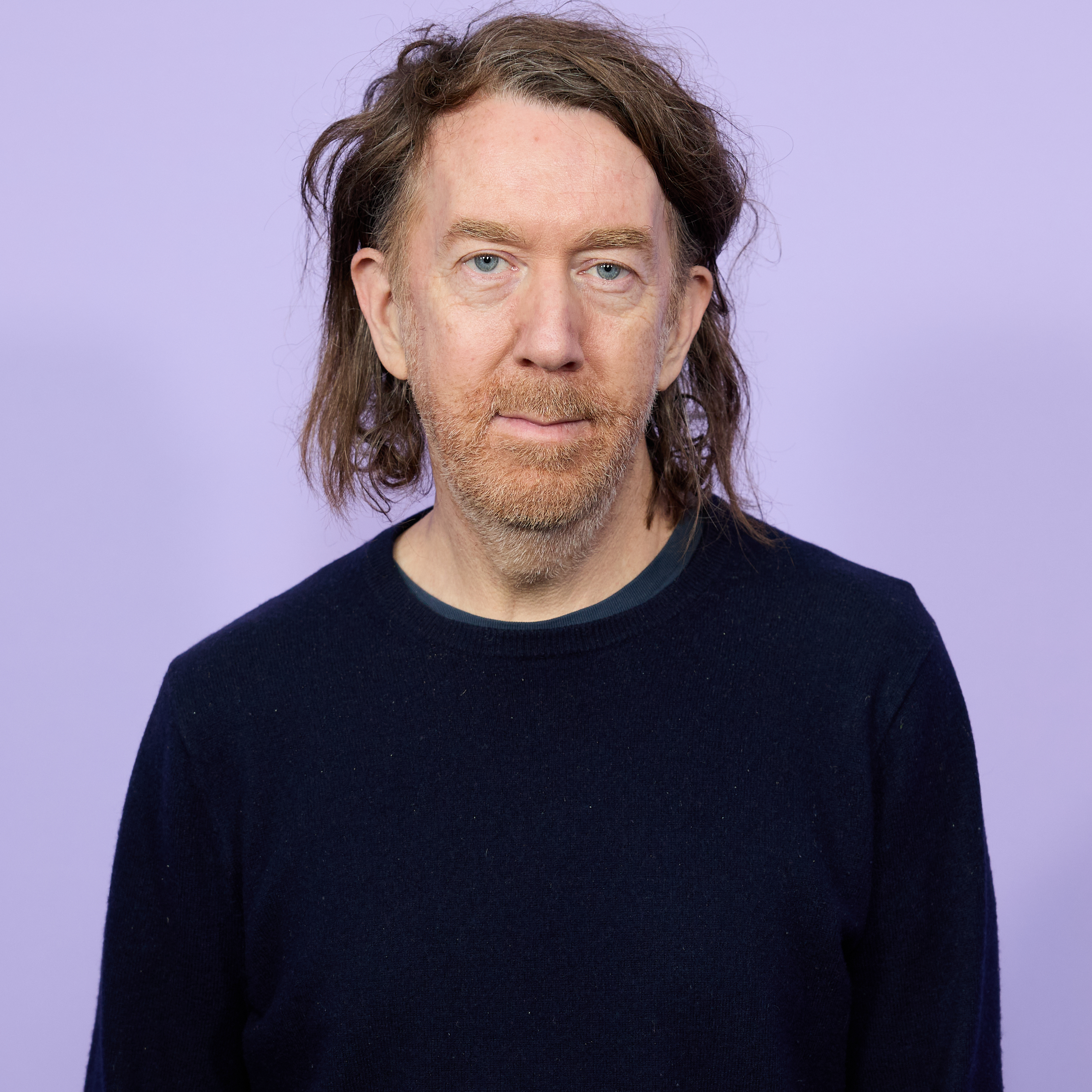
- Smith at the 40th Sundance Film Festival in 2024
- Born: 1970 (age 55–56); Rahway, New Jersey, USA
- Education: University of Wisconsin–Milwaukee
- Occupation: Filmmaker
- Known for: American Movie; Fyre; Jim & Andy

Chris Smith (born 1970) is an American filmmaker. He directed American Movie, which was awarded the Grand Jury Prize for Documentary at the 1999 Sundance Film Festival.

Smith has since directed several high-profile documentary projects for Netflix including the films, Jim & Andy: The Great Beyond (2017), Fyre (2019), "Sr." (2022), and Wham! (2023); alongside the mini-series, The Disappearance of Madeleine McCann (2019), Bad Vegan: Fame. Fraud. Fugitives. (2022), Biggest Heist Ever (2024) and Mr. McMahon (2024). Smith was an executive producer on Tiger King which was nominated for Primetime Emmy Award for Outstanding Documentary or Nonfiction Series in 2020.

Smith's HBO documentary television series, 100 Foot Wave (2021–present), has been nominated for several awards, and won the Primetime Emmy Award for Outstanding Cinematography for a Nonfiction Program in 2023.

== Career ==
Smith completed his first film, American Job, while attending the University of Wisconsin–Milwaukee's Graduate Film Program. He was nominated for a "Someone to Watch Award" from the Independent Spirit Awards. Smith met Mark Borchardt, the subject of American Movie, while editing American Job, and began filming a documentary about the making of Borchardt's psychological thriller Coven. Both films played at the Sundance Film Festival, and American Movie was bought by Sony Pictures for $1 million.

== Later works ==
His resume includes the Emmy-nominated Jim & Andy (2017), about the making of the 1999 Andy Kaufman biopic Man on the Moon.

Smith wrote and directed the documentary Fyre: The Greatest Party That Never Happened (2019), about the Fyre Festival fraud.

He also made a documentary about director Robert Downey Sr., co-directing together with Kevin Ford. The project, simply titled "Sr.", was produced by Team Downey, Robert Downey Jr.'s production company.

In 2024, Smith also directed a six-part docusereies about the Founder of the WWE (World Wrestling Entertainment), Vince McMahon, titled Mr. McMahon.

== Filmography ==
Year	Film	Notes
1996	American Job	Narrative feature
1999	American Movie	Sundance Film Festival winner
2001	Home Movie	
2003	The Yes Men	
2007	The Pool	Narrative feature
2009	Collapse	
2017	Jim & Andy: The Great Beyond	Primetime Emmy Award nomination
2019	Fyre	Primetime Emmy Award nominations
2019	The Disappearance of Madeleine McCann	8-part Netflix docuseries
2020	Tiger King	7-part Netflix docuseries, Executive Producer only
2021	100 Foot Wave	6-part HBO docuseries Winner, 2023 Primetime Emmy Award for Outstanding Cinematography for a Nonfiction Program Winner, 2025 Primetime Emmy Award for Outstanding Documentary or Nonfiction Series
2021	Operation Varsity Blues: The College Admissions Scandal	Documentary feature
2022	Bad Vegan: Fame. Fraud. Fugitives.	4-part Netflix docuseries
2022	"Sr."	
2022	Branson	4-part HBO Max docuseries
2023	Wham!	
2024	DEVO	
2024	Hollywood Con Queen	3-part Apple TV+ docuseries
2024	Mr. McMahon	six-part Netflix docuseries
2024	Biggest Heist Ever	Netflix documentary 15
2025	Don't Die: The Man Who Wants to Live Forever	Netflix documentary
2026	Bring Me the Beauties: A Model Cult	HBO documentary
2026	Wilder	
