= Mr. McMahon (miniseries) =

2024 documentary series by Chris Smith and Bill Simmons

- Promotional poster
- Genre: Documentary
- Directed by: Chris Smith
- Starring: Vince McMahon
- Country of origin: United States
- Original language: English
- No. of episodes: 6

Production
- Producers: Zara Duffy; Eric C. Loy; Matt Maxson; Bill Simmons; Abhay Sofsky; Zoe Trischka
- Editors: Steven Ross; Abhay Sofsky
- Running time: 60 minutes
- Production companies: Library Films; Ringer Films

Original release
- Network: Netflix
- Release: September 25, 2024

Mr. McMahon is a documentary television miniseries that explores the influential yet controversial career of the professional wrestling promoter Vince McMahon. It is directed by Chris Smith, who worked on Tiger King, with executive producer Bill Simmons and Zara Duffy, recognized for her contributions to Mission Blue. The documentary series featured numerous prominent figures from the world of professional wrestling, including Hulk Hogan, The Undertaker, Bruce Prichard, Shawn Michaels, Bret "The Hitman" Hart, Stone Cold Steve Austin, Paul Heyman, Eric Bischoff, Shane McMahon, Stephanie McMahon, and Triple H. It also included media personalities such as businesswoman Kay Koplovitz, professional wrestling journalist Dave Meltzer and other key individuals, providing a wide range of perspectives on McMahon's career and legacy. Netflix released all six episodes of the series on September 25, 2024.

== Background and release ==
The production of Mr. McMahon was shaped by extensive research, interviews, compiling over 200 hours of material. Directed by Chris Smith and Zara Duffy serving as executive producers, the series aimed to provide an in depth exploration of Vince McMahon's career and legacy. Interviews were conducted with McMahon, his family, business associates, wrestling personalities, and journalists; however, McMahon halted further interviews with production following the emergence of allegations of sexual misconduct.

Following the series trailer on September 5, the streaming platform Netflix released the six episodes at 3:01 A.M (ET) on September 25, 2024.

== Cast ==
- Vince McMahon (Founder, former chairman of the board, WWE)
- Tony Atlas (WWE Hall of Famer)
- Stone Cold Steve Austin (WWE Hall of Famer)
- Eric Bischoff (Executive producer (1993–1994)/Executive vice president, World Championship Wrestling, WWE Hall of Famer)
- Booker T (Color commentator, NXT, WWE Hall of Famer)
- John Cena
- Bob Costas (Sports broadcaster, NBC Sports)
- Bret Hart (WWE Hall of Famer)
- Jimmy Hart (WWE Hall of Famer)
- Paul Heyman (Former Owner, Extreme Championship Wrestling, WWE Hall of Famer)
- Hulk Hogan (WWE Hall of Famer)
- Kay Koplovitz (Founder, USA Network)
- Linda McMahon (Co-founder, Titan Sports Inc.)
- Shane McMahon
- Stephanie McMahon (Former chairperson, WWE)
- Dave Meltzer (Founder & publisher, Wrestling Observer Newsletter)
- Shawn Michaels (WWE Hall of Famer)
- Phil Mushnick (Sports columnist, New York Post)
- Bruce Prichard (Executive director, WWE)
- Cody Rhodes
- Wendi Richter (WWE Hall of Famer)
- Dwayne "The Rock" Johnson (Board member, TKO Group Holdings)
- Trish Stratus (WWE Hall of Famer)
- Triple H (Chief Content Officer, WWE, WWE Hall of Famer)
- The Undertaker (WWE Hall of Famer)

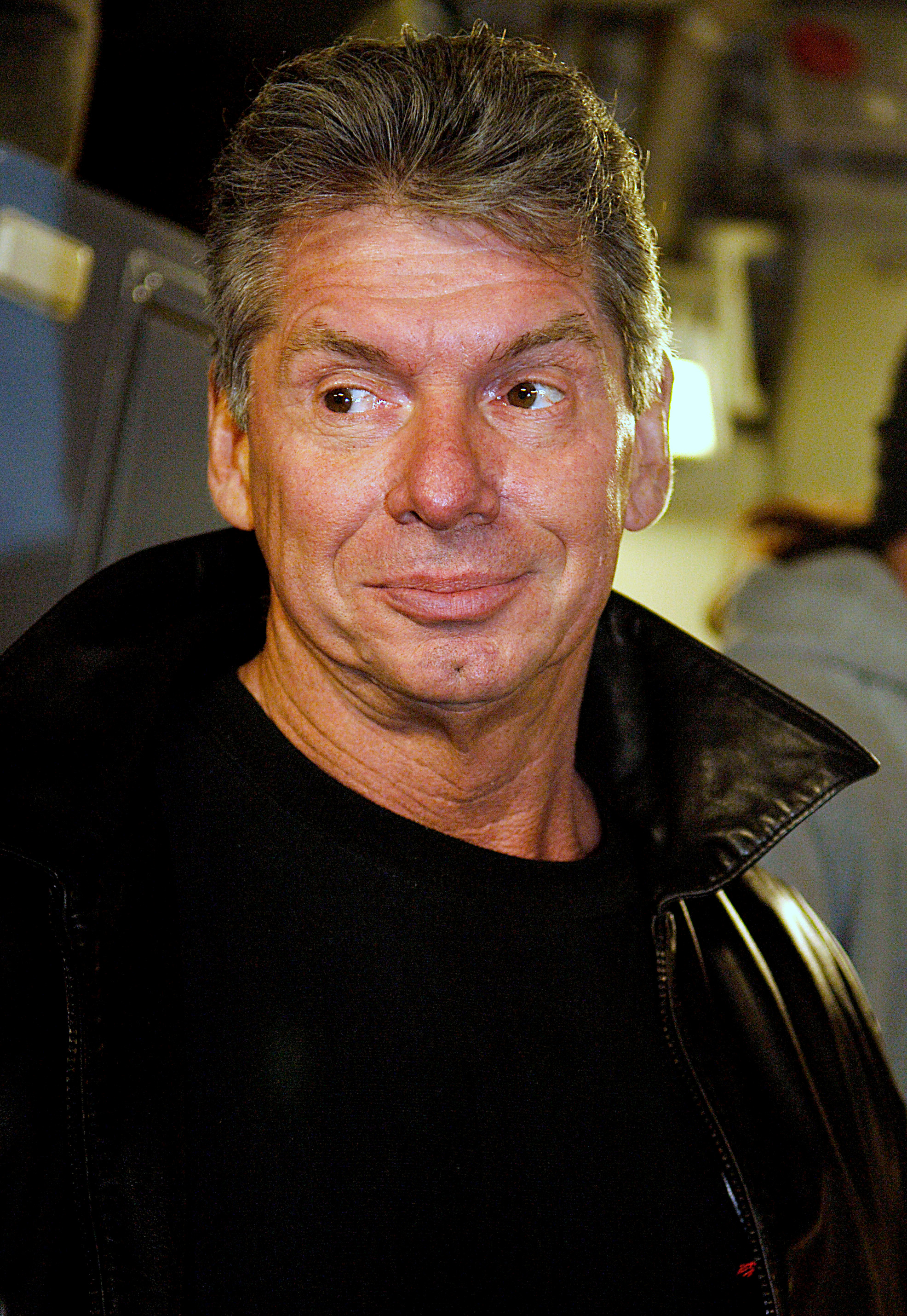
Vince McMahon

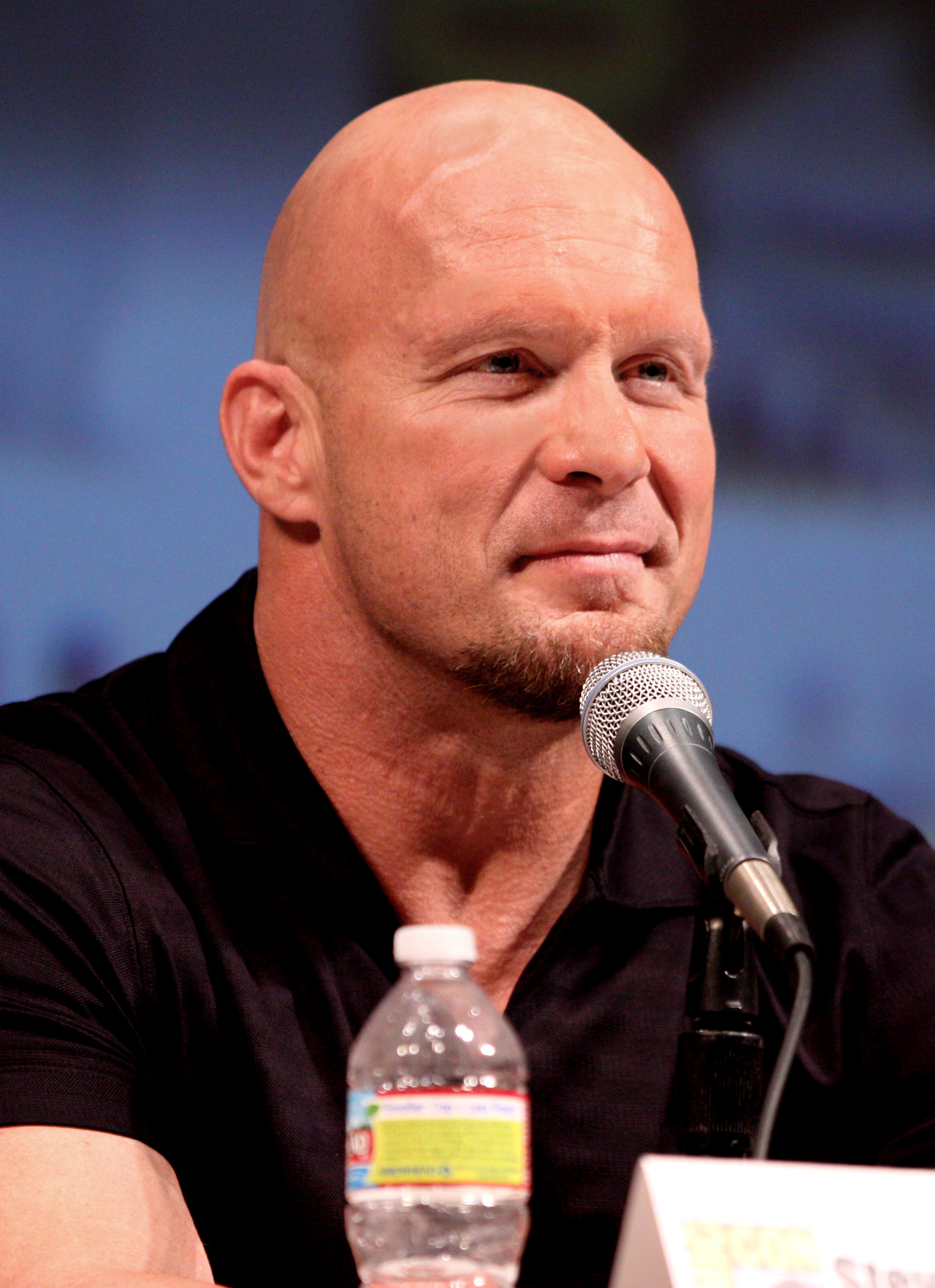
Steve Austin

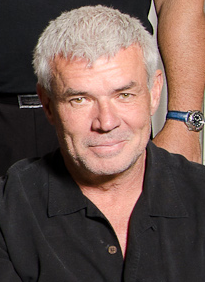
Eric Bischoff

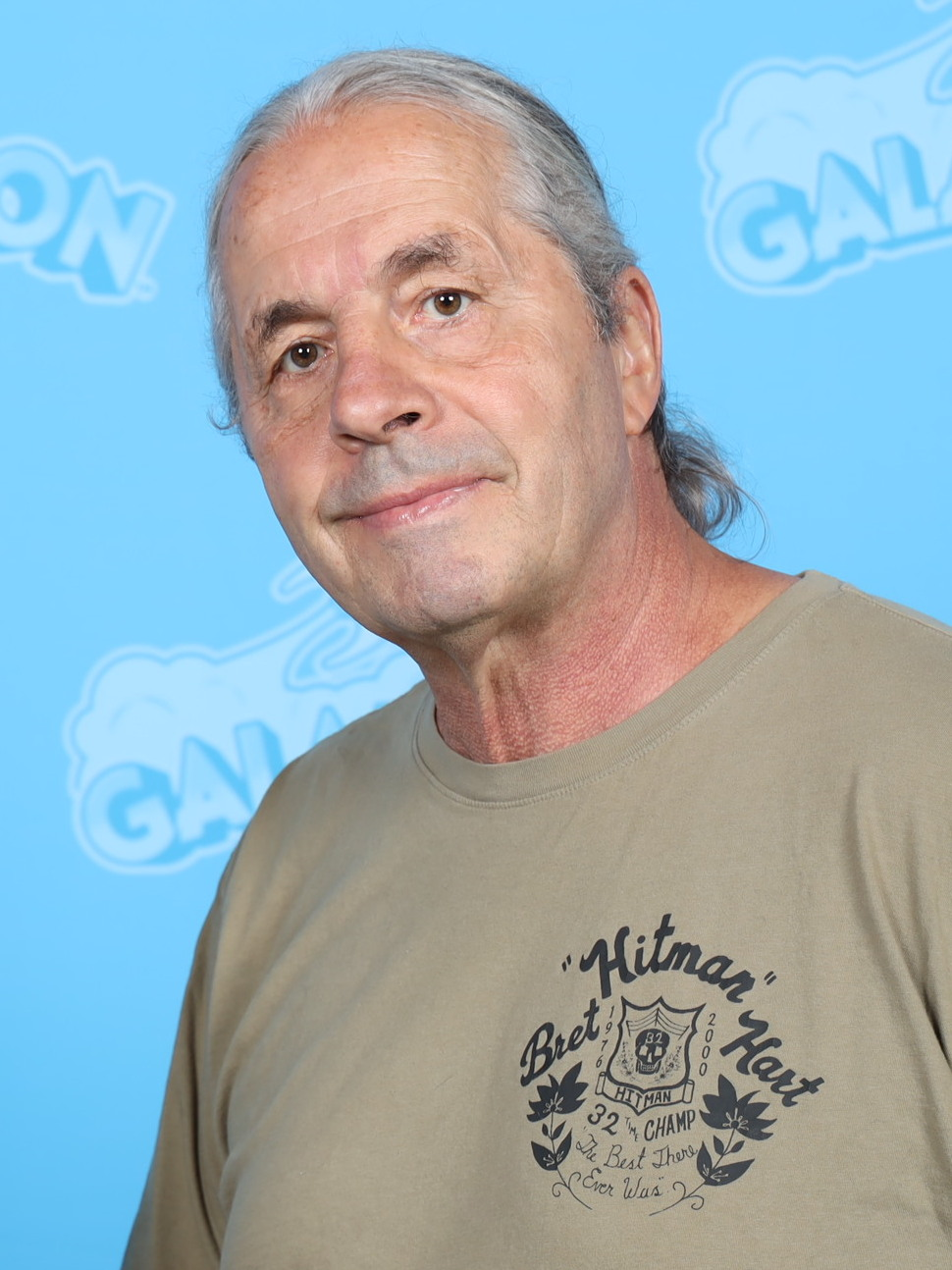
Bret Hart

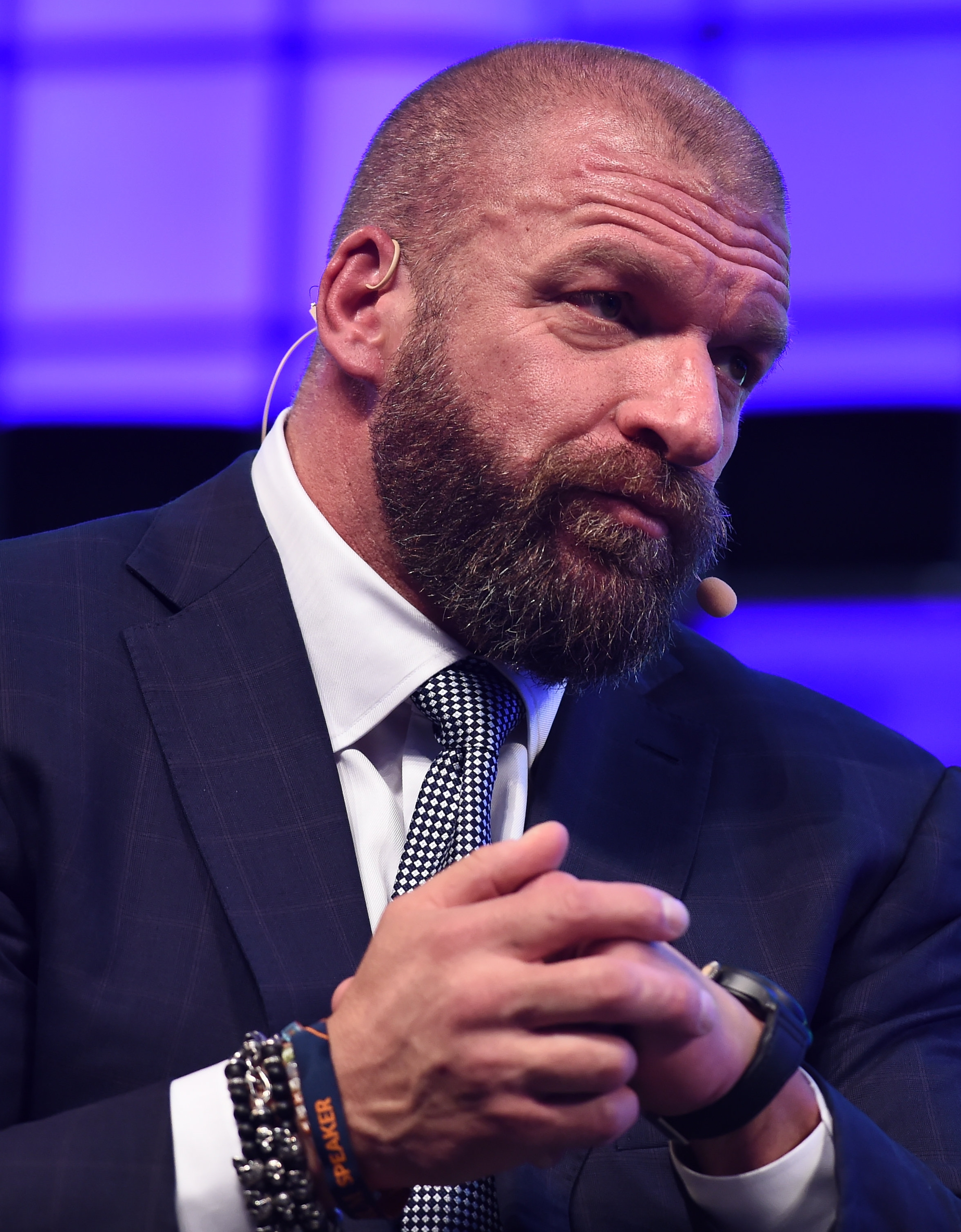
Paul "Triple H" Levesque

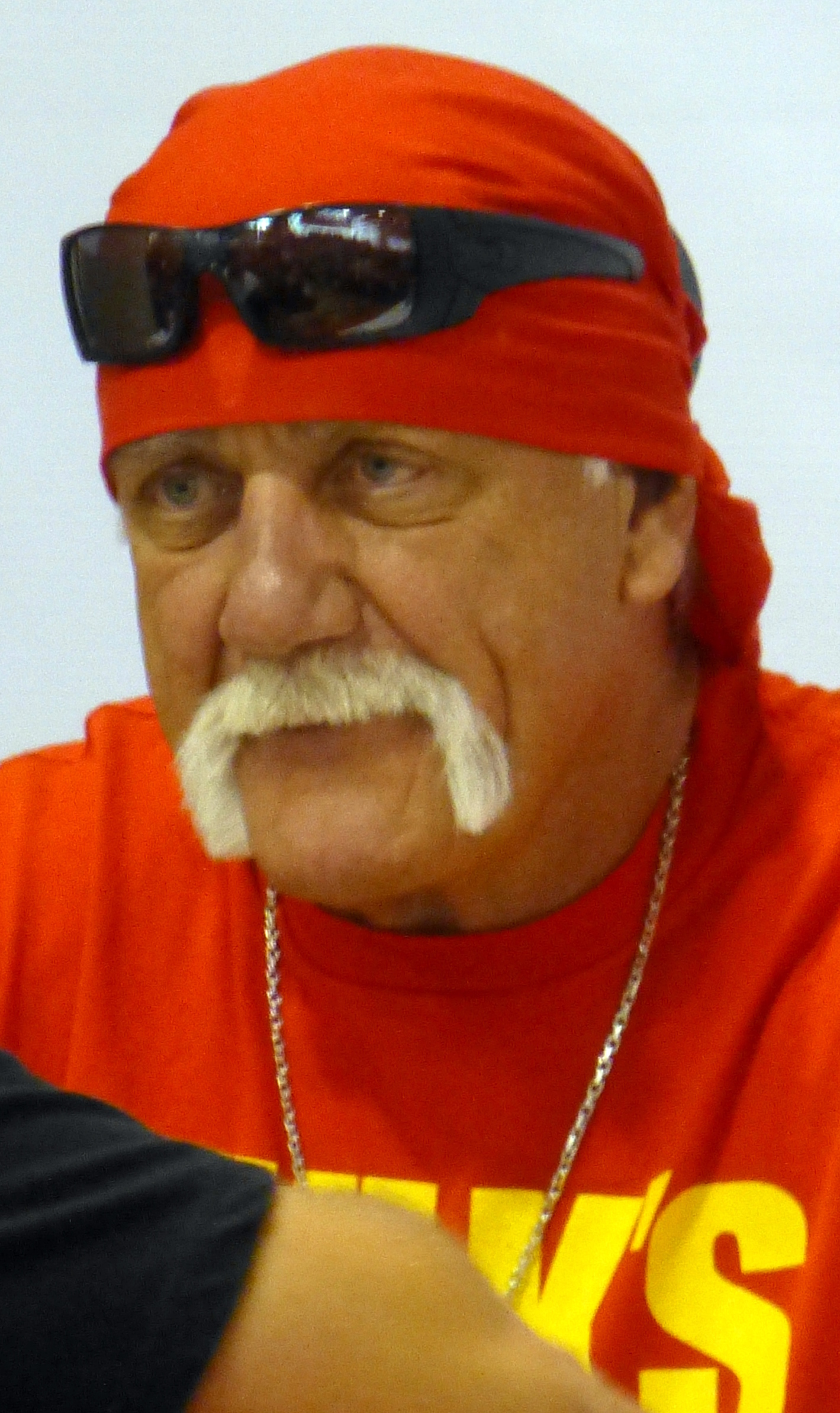
Hulk Hogan

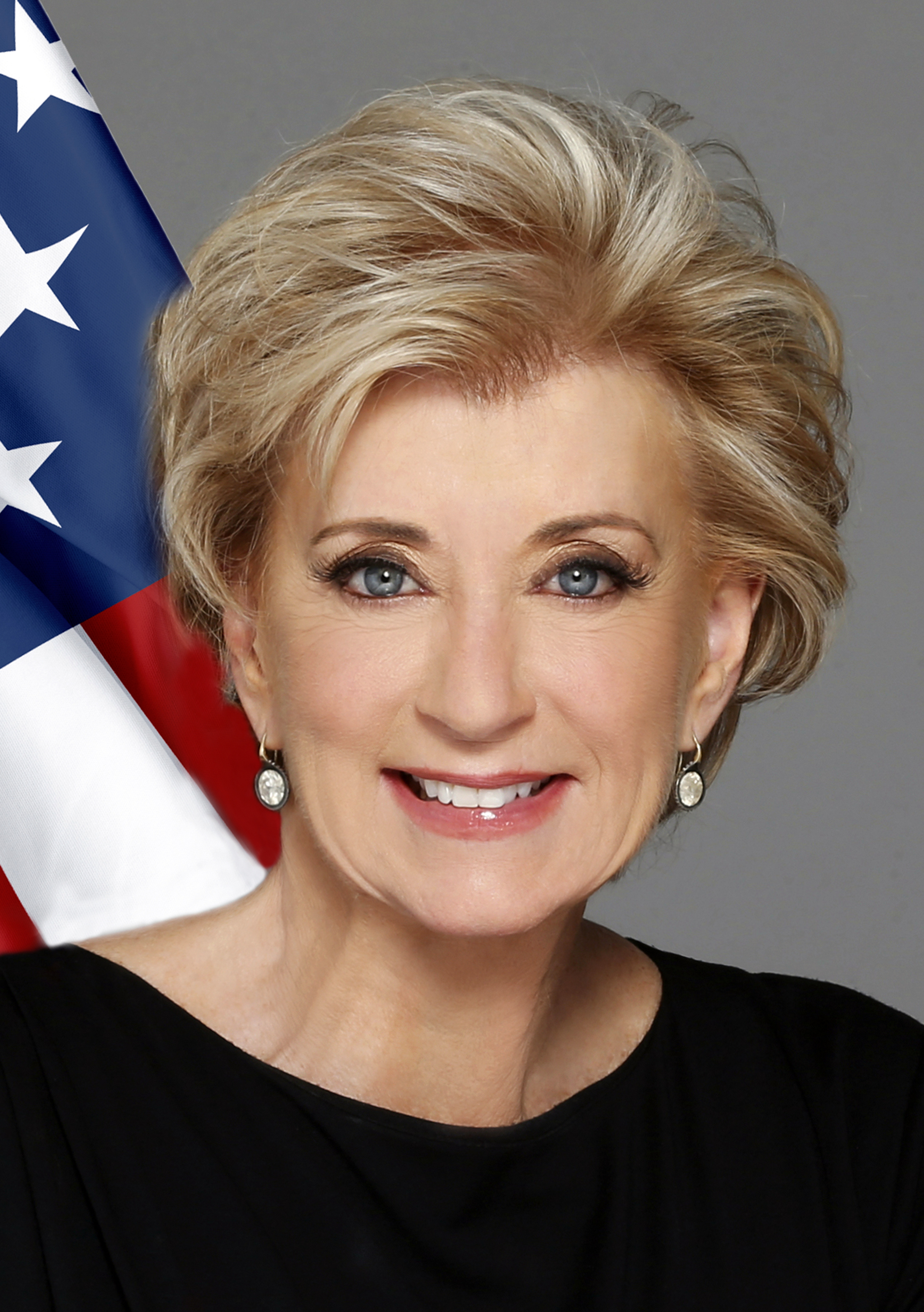
Linda McMahon

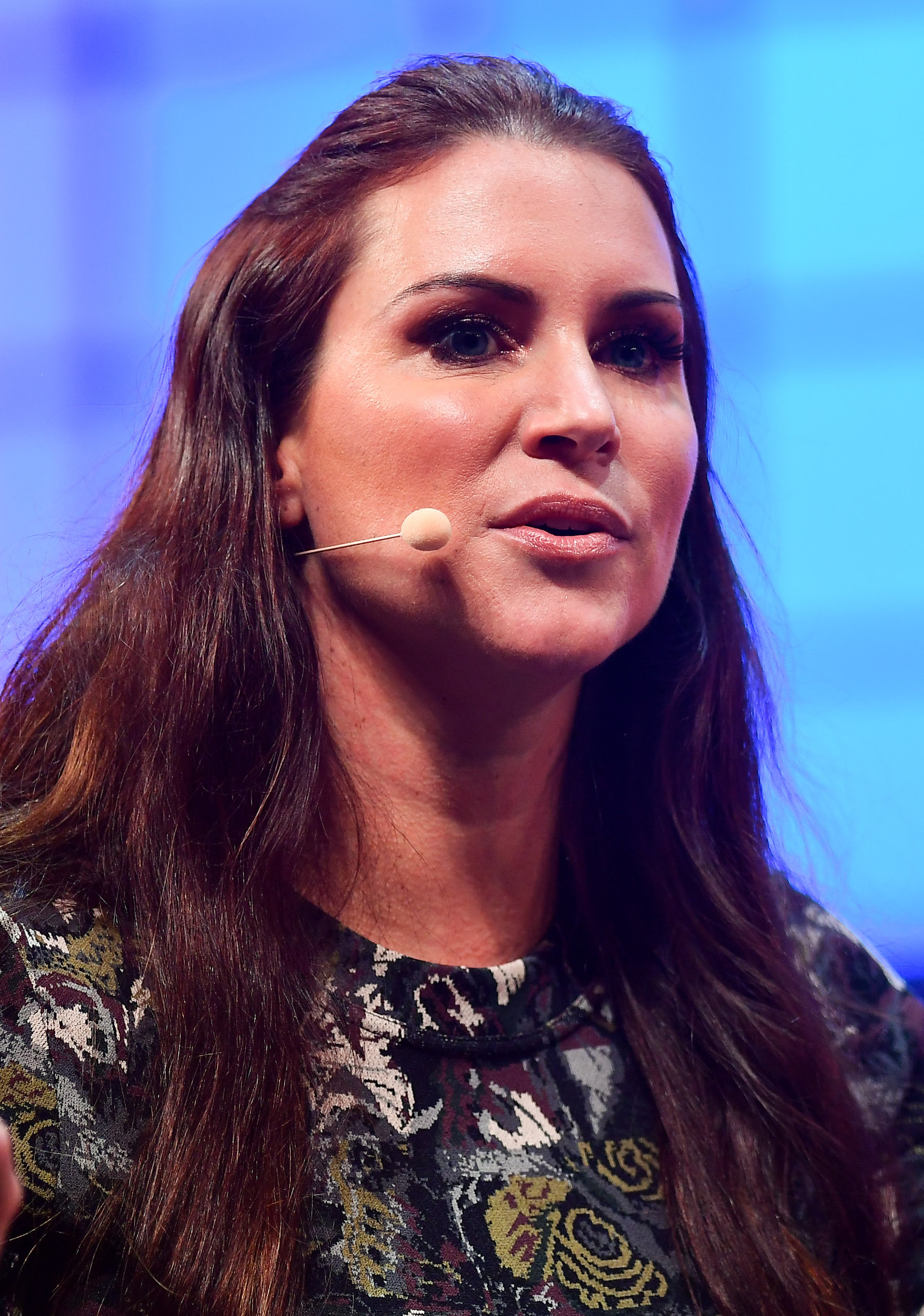
Stephanie McMahon

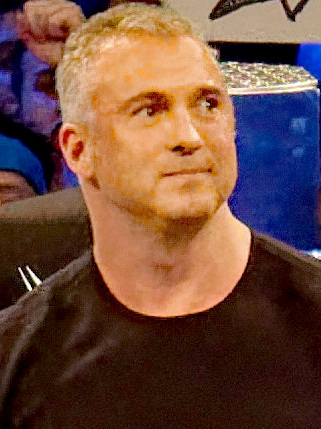
Shane McMahon

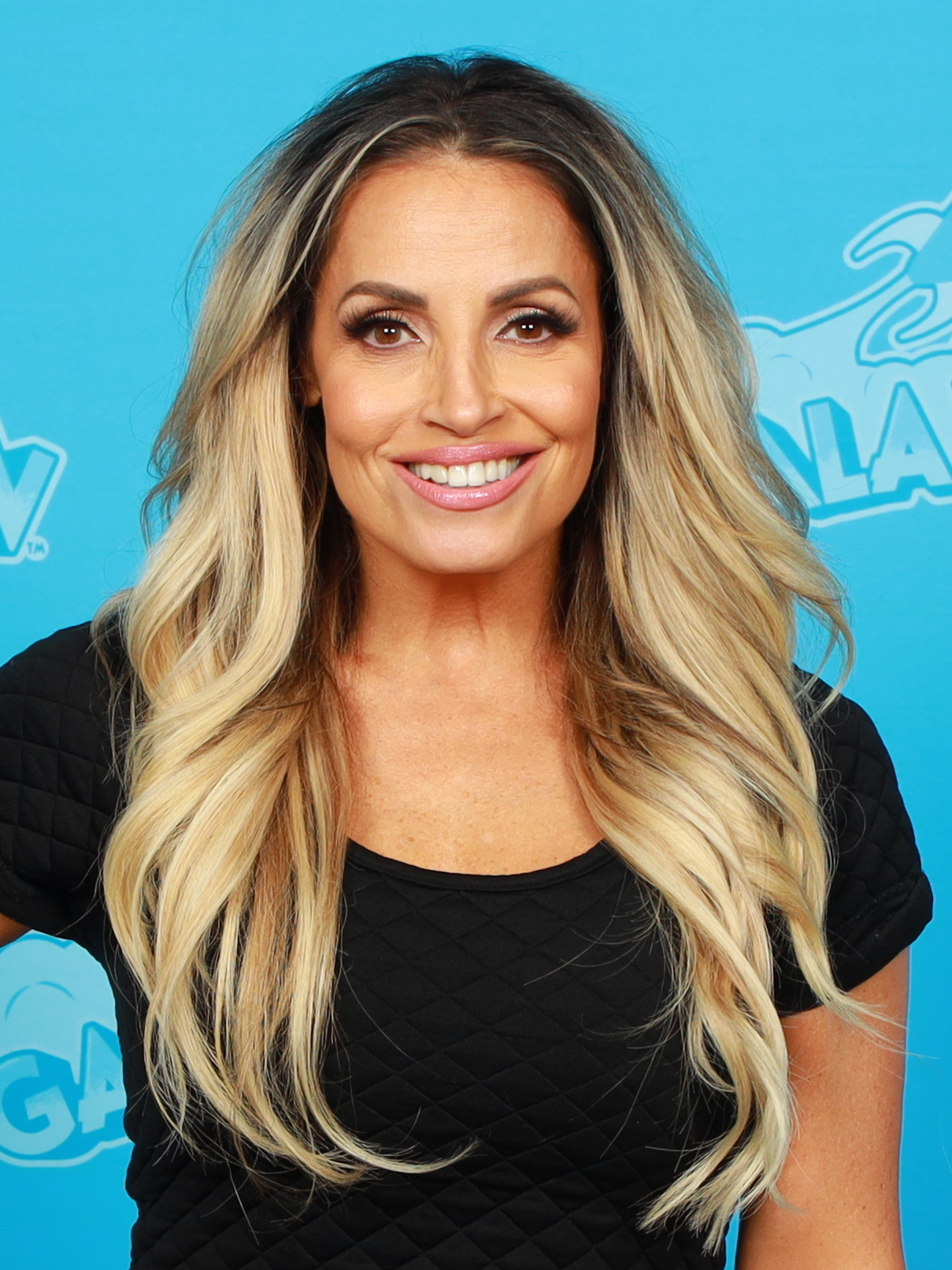
Trish Stratus

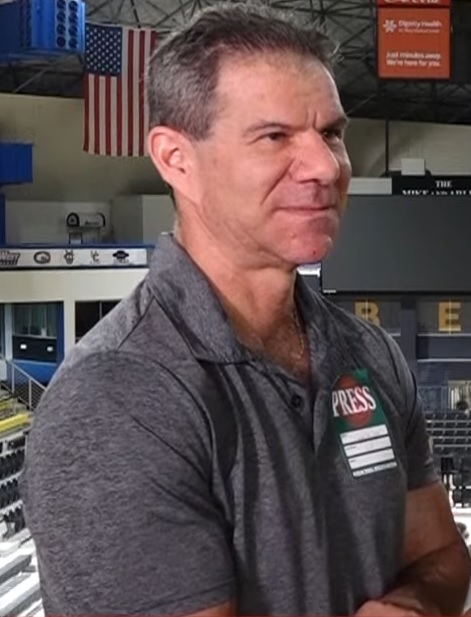
Dave Meltzer

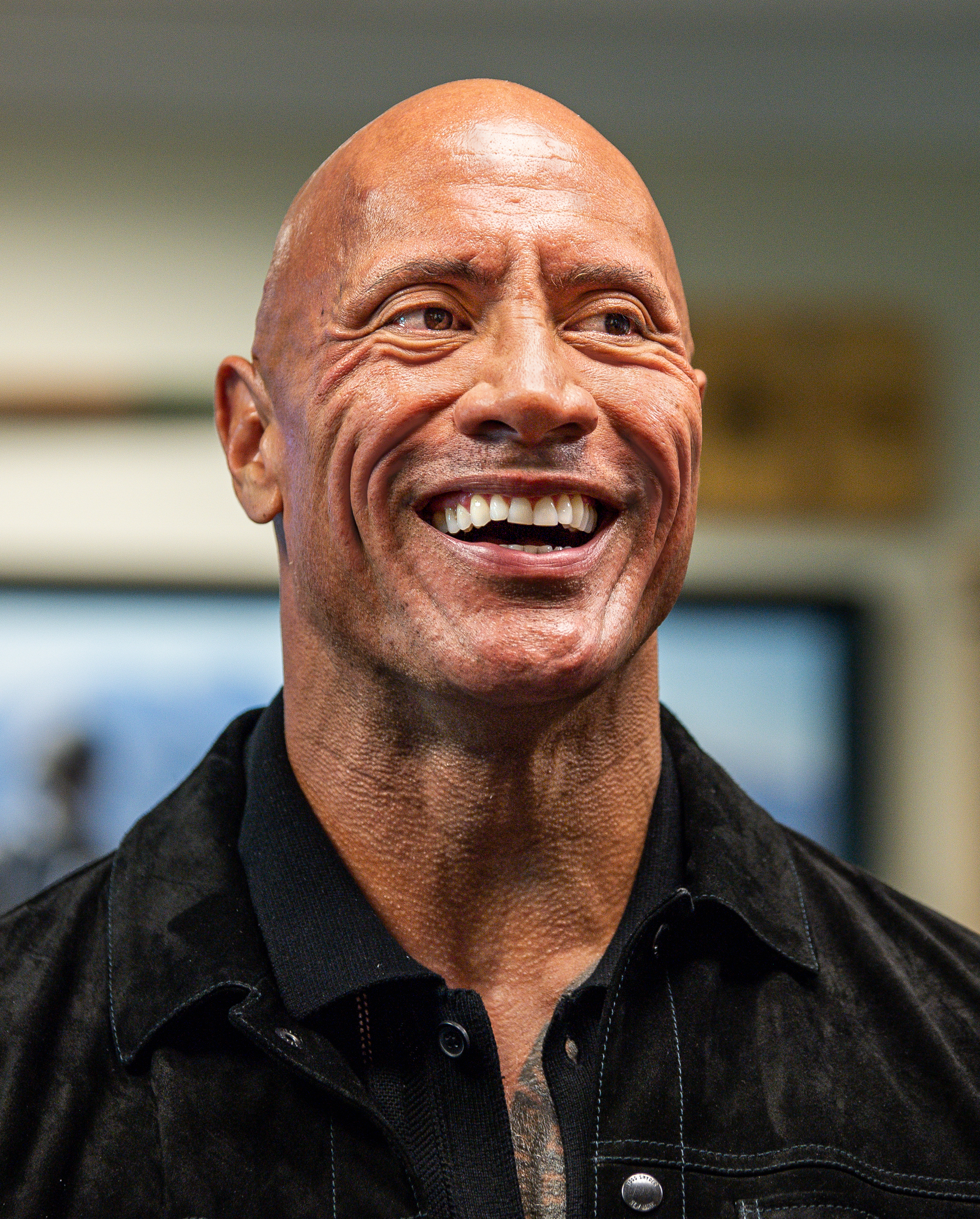
Dwayne "The Rock" Johnson

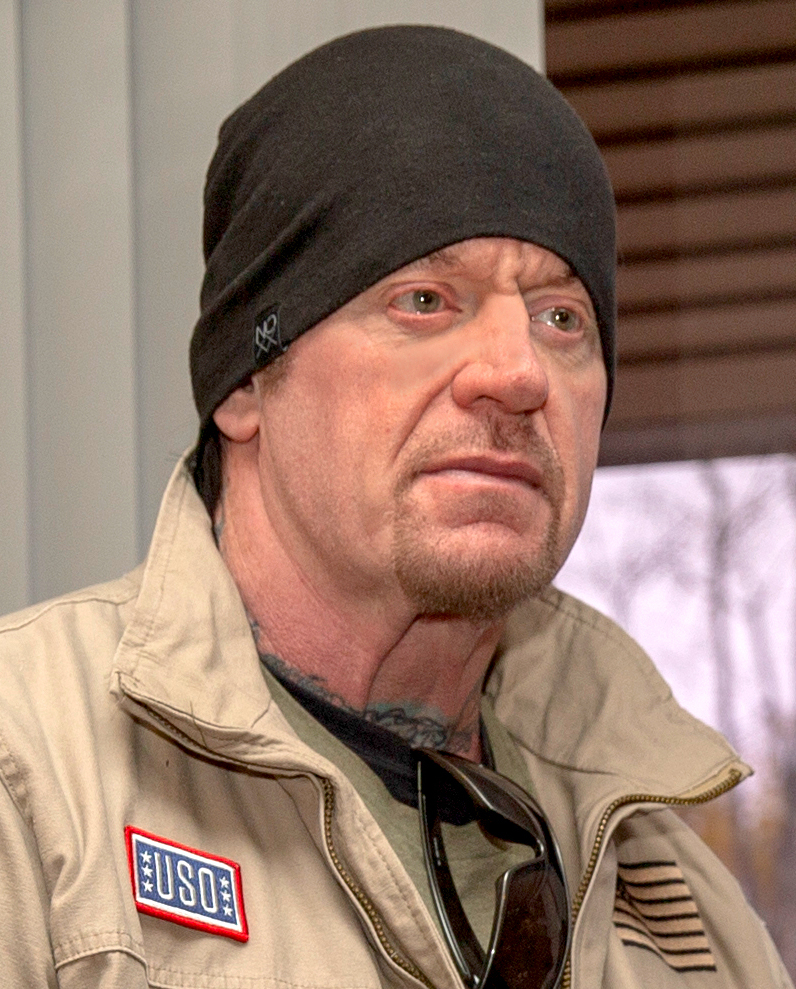
The Undertaker

== Episodes ==
No.	Title	Original release date
1	"Junior"	September 25, 2024
Vince McMahon talks about his early life from meeting his father, Vincent J. McMahon, for the first time to getting involved in his father's professional wrestling promotion, the World Wide Wrestling Federation. Shortly after purchasing the promotion from his father, he renamed it the World Wrestling Federation (WWF) and started promoting it outside its territorial boundaries of the northeastern states and poaching talent from other promotions. Hulk Hogan, who was fired by McMahon Sr. for starring in Rocky III, was brought back into the promotion to fulfill McMahon Jr.'s dream of bringing the WWF mainstream.
2	"Heat"	September 25, 2024
The success of WrestleMania I, as well as Saturday Night's Main Event premiering on network television, forced the WWF talent to work non-stop. Prior to WrestleMania 2, Jesse Ventura attempted to organize a union, which was immediately quashed after Hogan informed McMahon of Ventura's plans. In 1987, WrestleMania III drew a record-breaking attendance at the Pontiac Silverdome and solidified Hogan as a household name around the world. By the start of the 1990s, the WWF's popularity was on a decline while McMahon and the promotion came under heavy fire over a drug scandal and a sex scandal. Shortly after retiring from the WWF to focus on acting, Hogan was given a lucrative deal by Eric Bischoff to work for World Championship Wrestling (WCW).
3	"Screwjob"	September 25, 2024
During the United States v. McMahon trial, McMahon was acquitted after Hogan's testimony stated he never made any wrestlers do steroids. Amidst decreasing ticket sales and low ratings, the WWF introduced a new generation of wrestlers led by Bret "The Hitman" Hart. Meanwhile, WCW continued to entice former WWF talent with higher-paying contracts before directly competing with WWF in what would become the Monday Night War. Scott Hall and Kevin Nash's last day with the WWF ended with the "curtain call", in which they broke kayfabe and embraced in-ring rivals Shawn Michaels and Triple H, resulting in McMahon suspending Triple H. Months later, Hall and Nash entered WCW and shocked the world by forming the nWo with Hogan, leading to WCW Monday Nitro beating WWF Monday Night Raw in the ratings for 83 straight weeks. McMahon allowed Hart to leave for WCW, but fearing that he would take the WWF Championship with him, he orchestrated the "Montreal Screwjob" at the 1997 Survivor Series.
4	"Attitude"	September 25, 2024
In the aftermath of the Montreal Screwjob, McMahon took all the hate generated from the fans to create his on-screen heel persona, ushering in the Attitude Era. Stone Cold Steve Austin, The Rock, and D-Generation X became the WWF's top draws as the Attitude Era turned the tide of the Monday Night War against WCW, who would enter a period of critical and commercial decline. At the Over the Edge pay-per-view event on May 23, 1999, Owen Hart was descending from the rafters into the ring when his harness line malfunctioned, causing him to fall to his death while McMahon was criticized for letting the event continue.
5	"Family Business"	September 25, 2024
By 2000, WWF had gone public on the New York Stock Exchange while WCW floundered in the ratings war. In March 2001, WWF bought out WCW from AOL Time Warner for US$2.5 million, ending the Monday Night War. Meanwhile, McMahon collaborated with NBC to bring the XFL to compete with the NFL, but the football league was cancelled after only one season. A year later, McMahon lost a lawsuit by the World Wildlife Fund over the use of the WWF initialism, forcing him to change the promotion's name to World Wrestling Entertainment (WWE). In the absence of competition, WWE saw a decline in ratings and creativity, with The Rock leaving for an acting career and Austin walking out of the promotion. McMahon initiated the Ruthless Aggression Era, which saw the rise of John Cena. Amidst numerous business disagreements with his father, Shane McMahon left the WWE in 2009 to pursue his own ventures.
6	"The Finish"	September 25, 2024
Following his loss to Donald Trump (via the Bobby Lashley vs. Umaga match) at WrestleMania 23 in 2007, McMahon portrayed his death on an episode of WWE Raw. A week later, the storyline was scrapped due to the Chris Benoit double-murder and suicide, which once again put the WWE on notice for alleged steroid abuse. Former WWE talent and neuroscientist Christopher Nowinski examined Benoit's brain and concluded he suffered from chronic traumatic encephalopathy (CTE), a neurological disease linked to concussions sustained in the ring. Nowinski's findings led to WWE initiating their wellness policy and banning most physical attacks to the head, such as chair shots. In order to draw in more sponsors, WWE toned down its level of violence. As McMahon's daughter Stephanie and son-in-law Triple H were getting more involved on the production side, Shane returned to the WWE in 2016. WWE continued to flourish with the launch of the WWE Network, the multi-billion dollar deal with Peacock, and a rapid rise of its stocks. In June 2022, McMahon stepped down as Chairman and CEO amidst allegations of sexual misconduct and trafficking, but remained on the board of directors. He returned to the WWE as Chairman in January 2023, with Stephanie resigning as co-CEO. McMahon sold WWE to Endeavor, merging his promotion with UFC to form TKO Group Holdings. In 2024, amidst further allegations of sexual misconduct, McMahon once again resigned and sold US$411.95 million of TKO stock. He also canceled his final interview for this series.

== Themes ==
One of the central themes of the series is a discussion about how close Vince McMahon the person is to "Mr. McMahon", the character he portrayed on-screen in the WWE. While Vince McMahon is adamant the two are distinctly different, the vast majority of those interviewed for the series commented they felt they were one-and-the-same, or at least that the character exaggerated personality traits already present in the person. It also depicts McMahon expanding WWE reach though mainstream media and the creation of WrestleMania. Although presented as an expose, the production has been described as resembling an internal WWE narrative. Parallels are drawn between McMahon's public role and political campaigning, including his association with Donald Trump and the political career of Linda McMahon. Dave Meltzer of Wrestling Observer Newsletter has suggested this was a major source of frustration for McMahon upon his viewing of an advanced screening of the series, and is what led McMahon to denounce the series one day before its release.

== Reception ==
Vince also had Endeavor C.E.O. Ari Emanuel, his new partner in TKO, chime in on his behalf, also voicing concern about the doc's treatment of Vince's alter ego, 'Mr. McMahon,' which ended up being the title of the doc. Netflix refused to let the project go, and then this past January, the worse McMahon scandal broke, when a former employee sued alleging terrible abuse.

— Matthew Belloni of Puck wrote on his newsletter 'What I'm Hearing'.

Professional ratings
Aggregate scores
Source	Rating
Metacritic	68/100
Rotten Tomatoes	69%
Review scores
Source	Rating
The Guardian	3/5 stars
Common Sense Media	3/5 stars
/Film	8.5/10 stars

On September 23, Vince McMahon issued a statement on X, describing the documentary as "deceptive" and claiming it was intentionally misleading viewers by creating confusion around key events. Reportedly, McMahon attempted to purchase the rights to Mr. McMahon to prevent its distribution, aiming to ensure the documentary is not widely seen. However, Netflix declined and the documentary remained scheduled for release.

Writing for The Wall Street Journal, John Anderson noted that Phil Mushnick of the New York Post described McMahon as a "dirt bag", and encourages viewers to evaluate the portrayal of his scandals. Anderson suggests that Smith offers a relatively honest portrayal of McMahon, with insights from figures like Hulk Hogan and John Cena on his enigmatic personality and the parallels between wrestling and contemporary politics.

Wrestling journalist Dave Meltzer, who participated in the series, generally praised it upon release, feeling that it contained no major inaccuracies or embellishments aside from the recounting of Hulk Hogan vs. André the Giant at WrestleMania III. Meltzer did, however, feel that in episode 3, more emphasis should have been given to the fact that Bret Hart had creative control of his character in WWF, and that this was an important aspect in understanding why the Montreal Screwjob was so controversial. One exclusion Meltzer observed was that in episode 2, it is not shown that Linda McMahon received a tip-off that George Zahorian, who was supplying the WWF locker room with steroids, was under investigation, and subsequently that person was not hired to be a staff doctor. This helped Vince McMahon avoid conviction in the steroid trial.

Writing for BBC, Manish Pandey and Riyah Collins observed that while the six-part documentary provides a "fairly honest portrait" of Vince McMahon's career, it struggles to offer new insights, due to his withdrawal from filming following serious allegations. They noted the film's portrayal of McMahon, his influence on the wrestling industry and controversies inside the WWE particularly its depiction of women during the Attitude Era. It also noted the theme of McMahon's role as a father figure within the WWE.

Alex Reid from The Guardian rated the documentary three out of five stars, praising its editing and research and depiction of the history of the WWE, but noting that it felt like a "missed opportunity" due to the absence of key figures, including its lack of interviews with the women who accused McMahon of sexual assault.

Scott Hines of Decider gave the documentary a "Stream It" recommendation. He wrote that even those who are not wrestling fans are likely familiar with Vince McMahon, describing him as a figure who become part of popular culture, whether through his role in WWE or through the "increasingly excited guy" meme. Hines observed that Mr. McMahon cannot tell the full story because of Netflix business ties to WWE, but he still found it compelling and though it offered plenty of value, even if approached with caution. He pointed to what he called the "Most Plot-y line", where McMahon tells his interviewer "I wish I could tell you the real stories, holy shit.", and when asked to share one, McMahon declines.

On the review aggregator website Rotten Tomatoes, Mr. McMahon has an approval rating of 69% based on 12 reviews, with an average rating of 6.9/10. Metacritic, which uses a weighted average, assigned a score of 68 out of 100 based on 6 critics, indicating "generally favorable" reviews.
