= American Job =

- Directed by: Chris Smith
- Written by: Doug Ruschaupt; Randy Russell; Chris Smith
- Produced by: Chris Smith
- Starring: Randy Russell
- Cinematography: Chris Smith
- Edited by: Sarah Price; Chris Smith
- Distributed by: Bluemark Productions
- Release date: January 22, 1996
- Running time: 90 minutes
- Country: United States
- Language: English

American Job is a 1996 independent film directed by Chris Smith.

== Summary ==
Shot in a satirical pseudo-documentary style, the film follows Randy, a young man living in a Midwestern US town, as he tries one mundane job after another, including monitoring a machine at a plastics factory, working as a clean-up person at a fast-food restaurant, cleaning motels, and becoming a telephone solicitor.

== Inspiration ==
The film was directly inspired by the 1987 magazine "American Job" created by Randy Russell, which was a collection of job stories from low-wage workers around the United States.

== Synopsis ==
American Job is a narrative film about Randy Scott (Randy Russell), a youth caught in the dismal confusion of living and working in the world of minimum wage. The film follows Randy through a number of low-paying, menial jobs including fast food dishwasher, janitor, telemarketer, and factory worker. It highlights the sheer boredom of minimum wage work and is a slightly comical and occasionally depressing look at what life is like in the US minimum wage arena.

== Production ==
American Job was filmed in 1995 in the midwestern United States for $14,000 (USD). It was director Chris Smith's first film.

== Reception ==
In 1996, the film was part of a roving national exhibition as part of the Fuel Tour. It screened in 1996 at the Museum of Modern Art in New York City as part of the museum's Cineprobe series, and was also screened at the 1996 SXSW Film Festival in Austin, Texas. It has received positive reviews by various media outlets. Nicolas Rapold of The New York Sun later called it "Easily one of the decade's best indie debuts" and likened it to Mike Judge's 1999 cult workplace comedy Office Space. The film also garnered director Chris Smith with a 1997 Independent Spirit Award nomination for the Someone to Watch Award.
