= Vince McMahon =

American professional wrestling promoter (born 1945)

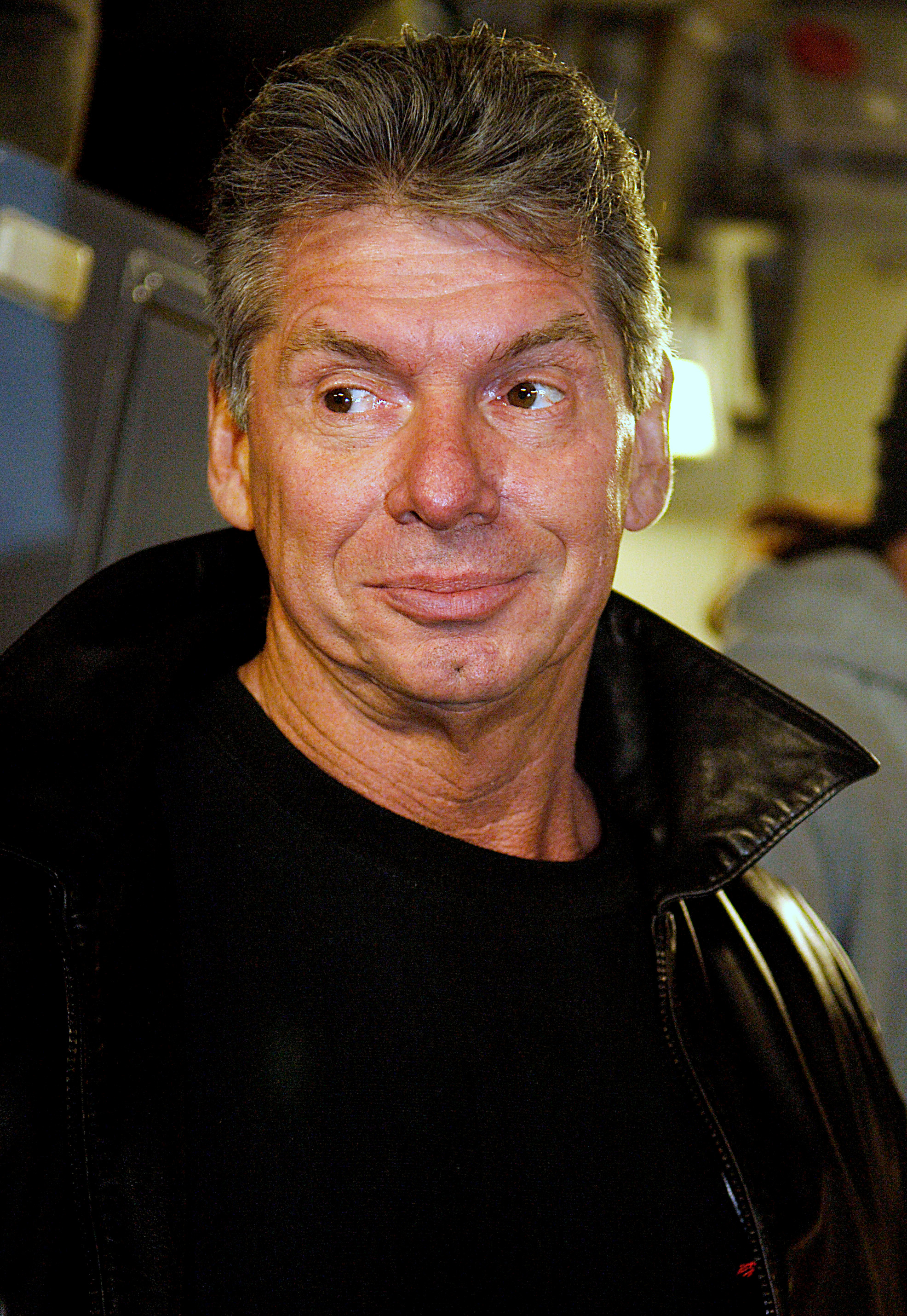
- McMahon in 2006
- Born: Vincent Kennedy McMahon; August 24, 1945 (age 81); Pinehurst, North Carolina, U.S.
- Other names: Vinnie Lupton; Vince McMahon Jr. Vincent K. McMahon
- Education: East Carolina University (BA)
- Occupations: Businessman; media proprietor; professional wrestling executive
- Spouse: Linda Edwards (m. 1966, separated)
- Children: Shane; Stephanie
- Father: Vincent J. McMahon
- Relatives: McMahon family
- Professional wrestling career
- Ring name(s): Mr. McMahon; Vince McMahon
- Billed height: 6 ft 2 in (188 cm)
- Billed weight: 248 lb (112 kg)
- Billed from: Greenwich, Connecticut
- Trained by: Tom Prichard
- Debut: 1969 (ring announcer); 1971 (commentator); April 13, 1998 (wrestler)
- Retired: July 22, 2022

Vincent Kennedy McMahon (/məkˈmæn/ mək-MAN; born August 24, 1945) is an American businessman and former professional wrestling promoter. McMahon, along with his later-estranged wife Linda, is co-founder of the modern WWE, (Note: McMahon and Linda co-founded Titan Sports, Inc., which purchased his father's regional wrestling promotion the World Wrestling Federation (now known as WWE) in 1982.) the world's largest professional wrestling promotion. Outside of professional wrestling, McMahon has occasionally ventured into promoting other sports. His projects have included the World Bodybuilding Federation and the XFL football league.

McMahon graduated from East Carolina University with a degree in business in 1968, and began his tenure in professional wrestling as a commentator for WWE (then called the World Wide Wrestling Federation or WWWF) for most of the 1970s. He bought the company from his father, Vincent J. McMahon, in 1982 and almost monopolized the industry, which previously operated as separate entities across the United States. This led to the development of the annual event WrestleMania, which became the world's most successful professional wrestling event. WWE then faced industry competition from World Championship Wrestling (WCW) in the 1990s before purchasing and absorbing WCW in 2001. WWE also purchased the assets of the defunct Extreme Championship Wrestling (ECW) in 2003.

McMahon appeared on-screen for WWE from 1969 until 2022, initially as a personable play-by-play commentator. In 1997, he adopted the character of Mr. McMahon, portrayed as an irascible, villainous, swaggering tyrant who obsessed over maintaining control of his wrestling company and often growled the catchphrase "you're fired!" when dismissing an employee. Under the villainous Mr. McMahon gimmick, he competed in wrestling matches and became a one-time WWE Champion, a one-time ECW Champion, a Royal Rumble winner, and a multi-time pay-per-view headliner.

Revelations of hush-money agreements McMahon paid over affairs with former WWE employees led to McMahon announcing his retirement from WWE in July 2022. However, he returned to WWE as executive chairman in January 2023, and oversaw the acquisition of WWE by Endeavor, who subsequently merged WWE and Zuffa, owner of the Ultimate Fighting Championship (UFC) mixed martial arts promotion. McMahon briefly served as the executive chairman of the newly formed company, TKO Group Holdings (TKO). Subsequent allegations of sex trafficking and sexual assault led to his resignation in January 2024. After a federal investigation, McMahon settled charges with the Securities and Exchange Commission for over $1.7 million in January 2025 for undisclosed hush money payments while not admitting or denying the findings.

== Early life, marriage and family ==
Vincent Kennedy McMahon was born on August 24, 1945, in Pinehurst, North Carolina, to Victoria (née Hanner) and Vincent James McMahon, a wrestling promoter. Not long after his birth, his father left the family and took McMahon's older brother, Roderick Jr., with him. McMahon did not see his father again until he was 12 years old. His paternal grandfather, Jess McMahon, had been a boxing and wrestling promoter, and both grandparents on his father's side were of Irish descent.

During his childhood, McMahon was raised under the name Vinnie Lupton, using the surname of one of his stepfathers. He experienced a difficult upbringing and has spoken publicly about abuse he endured at the hands of one stepfather, Leo Lupton. He also stated that he suffered sexual abuse which "wasn't from the male" as a youth. In a 2000 interview, McMahon reflected, "It is unfortunate that [Lupton] died before I could kill him. I would have enjoyed that." McMahon and his self-described "majored in badass" years as a teen (where he claimed to run moonshine in Harlowe, North Carolina) saw him faced with the choice of reform school or the Fishburne Military School in Waynesboro, Virginia; McMahon chose the latter and graduated from the military school in 1964. He has cited the structure of military school as a formative influence and has said he struggled with dyslexia during his youth.

=== Marriage and family ===
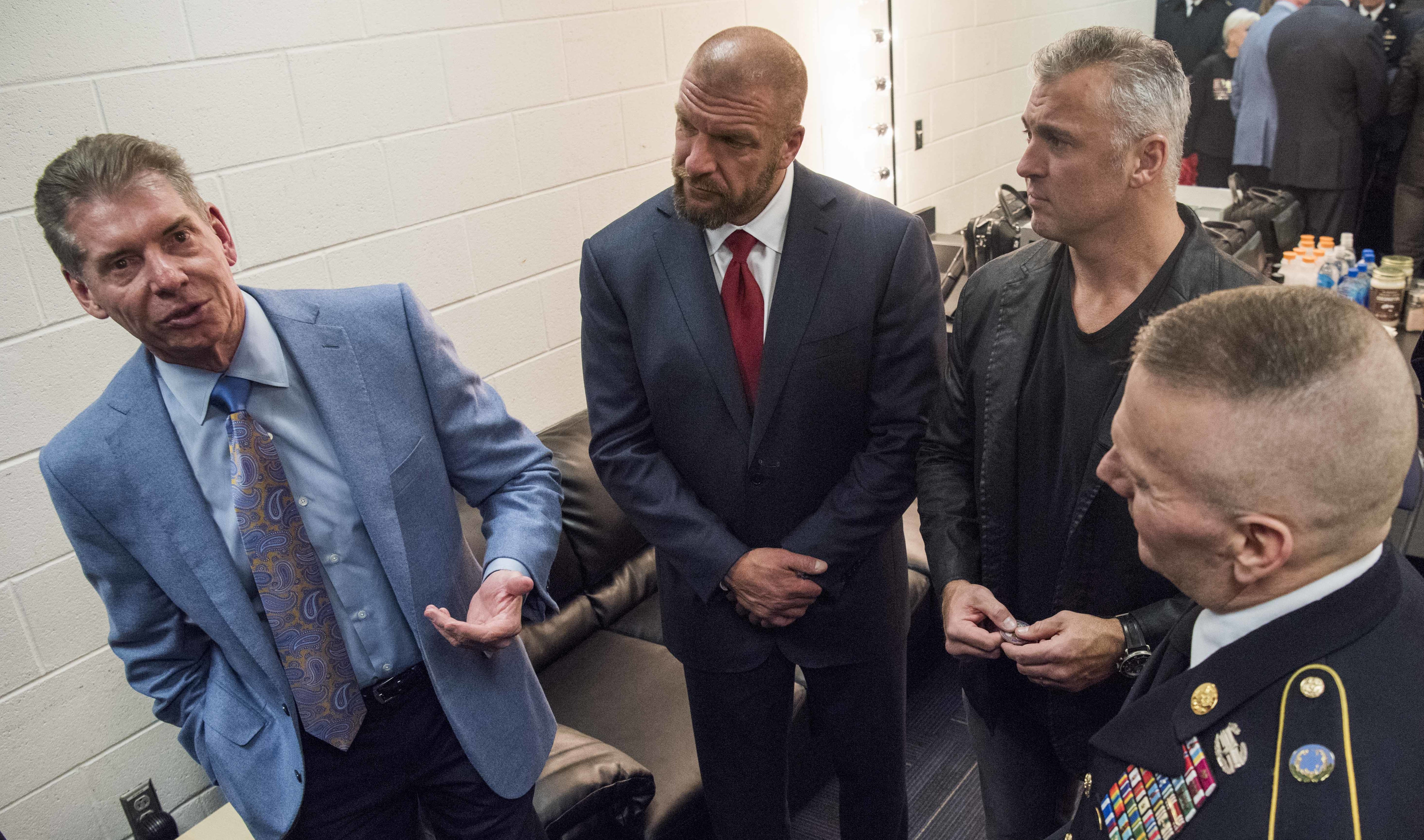
McMahon with Paul Levesque and Shane McMahon, talking to Command Sgt. Maj. John W. Troxell in December 2016

McMahon married Linda Edwards on August 26, 1966, in New Bern, North Carolina. The two met in church during their teenage years—he was 16 and she was 13—and were introduced by his mother. At the time, McMahon was still using the Lupton surname. The couple remained married for decades and were longtime business partners in WWE, although they reportedly separated at some point prior to 2022 without pursuing a legal divorce.

They have two children, Shane and Stephanie, both of whom became involved in the family's wrestling business. The McMahons have six grandchildren: Shane and his wife, Marissa Mazzola, have three sons, while Stephanie and her husband, Paul Levesque (better known by his ring name Triple H), have three daughters.

== Business career ==
=== Early business dealings ===
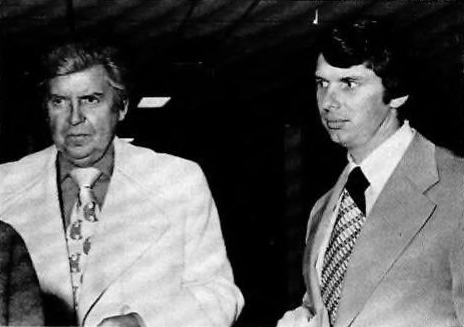
McMahon with his father Vincent J. McMahon, c. 1970s

McMahon first met the promoter for Capitol Wrestling Corporation (CWC), his father, Vincent J. McMahon, at the age of 12. At that point, McMahon became interested in following in his father's professional wrestling footsteps and often accompanied him on trips to Madison Square Garden. McMahon wanted to be a wrestler, but his father did not allow him, explaining that promoters did not appear on the show and should stay apart from their wrestlers. However, McMahon did work for the promotion as an announcer beginning in 1969.

In 1968, McMahon graduated from East Carolina University with a business degree and after an unremarkable career as a traveling salesman, he was eager to assume a managerial role in his father's World Wide Wrestling Federation promotion. In 1971, he was assigned to a small territory in Maine, where he promoted his first card. Throughout the 1970s, McMahon became a prominent force in his father's company and, over the next decade, assisted his father in tripling TV syndication. The younger McMahon was also behind the Muhammad Ali versus Antonio Inoki match of 1976.

On February 21, 1980, McMahon officially founded Titan Sports and the company's headquarters were established in South Yarmouth, Massachusetts, using the now-defunct Cape Cod Coliseum as a home base for the company. McMahon then became chairman of the company and his wife, Linda, became the "co-chief executive". In 1982, Titan acquired control of the CWC from McMahon's ailing father (who died in May 1984) and his partners.

=== Professional wrestling ===
==== 1980s wrestling boom ====
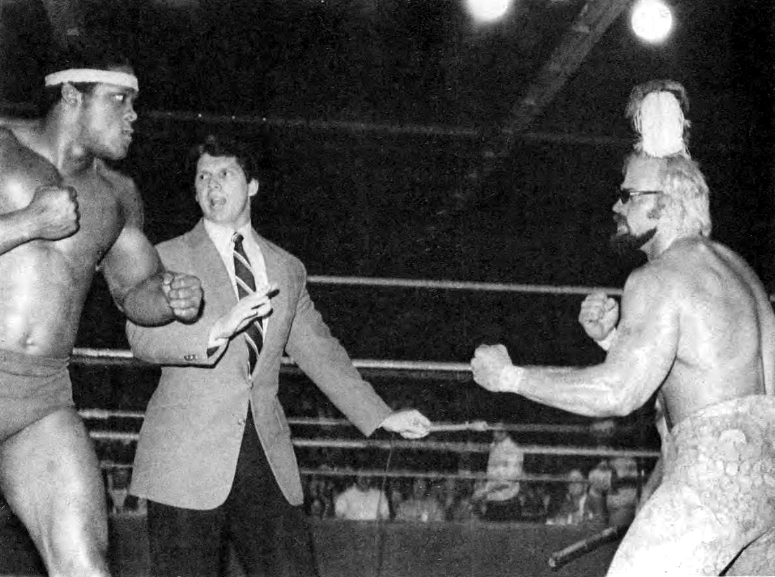
McMahon in the middle of a confrontation between Tony Atlas (left) and Jesse Ventura, 1982

When he purchased the WWF in 1982, professional wrestling was a business run by regional promotions. Various promoters understood that they would not invade each other's territories, as this practice had gone on undeterred for decades. The National Wrestling Alliance (NWA) became the governing body for all the regional territories across the country and as far away as Japan. McMahon had a different vision of what the industry could become, splitting from the NWA in 1983 and expanding the company nationally by promoting in areas outside of the company's traditional reach. He also signed talent from other companies, such as the American Wrestling Association (AWA), recruiting Hulk Hogan to be the WWF's charismatic new megastar. During the ensuing The Rock 'n' Wrestling Connection, the WWF incorporated pop music stars into wrestling storylines. These measures expanded the WWF fanbase into a national mainstream audience and led to the creation of WrestleMania.

During the late 1980s, McMahon shaped the WWF into a unique brand that reached out to family audiences while attracting fans who had not paid attention to professional wrestling before. By directing his storylines toward highly publicized supercards like WrestleMania, McMahon capitalized on a fledgling revenue stream by promoting these events live on pay-per-view television. In 1987, the WWF reportedly drew 93,173 fans to the Pontiac Silverdome (which was called the "biggest crowd in sports-entertainment history") for WrestleMania III, that featured the main event of Hulk Hogan vs. André the Giant. On February 10, 1989, McMahon admitted before the New Jersey Senate that professional wrestling was predetermined. Regarded as the "death of kayfabe" and birth of sports entertainment, this disclosure allowed the WWF to operate without oversight from state athletic commissions.

==== Monday Night War ====
Beginning in September 1995, the WWF faced direct competition from Ted Turner's World Championship Wrestling (WCW) as part of the Monday Night War. After a turbulent period for the company which saw WCW maintain ratings superiority for 83 weeks in a row, WWF redirected storylines toward a more adult-oriented model. The concept became known as "WWF Attitude". McMahon, who for years had downplayed his ownership of the company on-screen, became involved in the most pivotal storylines of the era, as his evil Mr. McMahon character clashed with Stone Cold Steve Austin, who challenged his authority. As a result, the WWF suddenly found itself back in national pop-culture, drawing millions of viewers for its weekly Monday Night Raw broadcasts, which ranked among the highest-rated shows on cable television. In October 1999, McMahon led the WWF in an initial public offering of company stock.

McMahon ultimately was victorious against WCW, and he acquired the rights to the promotion from Turner Broadcasting System on March 23, 2001. On April 1, 2001, Extreme Championship Wrestling (ECW) filed for bankruptcy leaving WWF as the last major wrestling promotion at that time. McMahon later acquired the assets of ECW on January 28, 2003.

==== WWF becomes WWE ====
On May 5, 2002, World Wrestling Federation Entertainment, Inc. announced that it would be changing both its company name and the name of its wrestling promotion to World Wrestling Entertainment (WWE) after the company had lost a lawsuit initiated by the World Wildlife Fund over the WWF trademark. The name change officially occurred the following day on May 6. Although mainly caused by the ruling in favor of the World Wildlife Fund regarding the "WWF" initialism, the company noted it provided an opportunity to emphasize its focus on entertainment.

Shortly after its name change, WWE transitioned into its Ruthless Aggression Era on June 24, 2002. This period still featured many similar elements of its predecessor the Attitude Era, including the levels of violence, sex, and profanity, but there was a greater emphasis on in-ring action. However, all WWE programs shifted to TV-PG ratings in July 2008 to make the promotion more appealing to corporate sponsors. As the promotion placed greater focus on brand extension, it stopped using its full name in April 2011, using only the abbreviation "WWE", which rendered it an orphaned initialism, though its legal name remained World Wrestling Entertainment, Inc. The WWE Network, which broadcast round-the-clock programming, including pay-per-view events, launched in 2014. Beginning in 2021, The Network was phased out as the company reached streaming agreements with other services, such as Peacock in the United States.

Throughout the 2010s and early 2020s, WWE increasingly shifted its business model toward maximizing profitability through lucrative media rights agreements, licensing, and revenue from sponsors. The strategy culminated in record revenues and profits despite long-term declines in television ratings and live-event attendance. The decline in television ratings began after the demise of WCW, but accelerated after Raw added a third hour in 2012.

==== Retirement, TKO merger and resignation ====
McMahon voluntarily stepped down as chairman and CEO of WWE on June 17, 2022, pending an internal investigation, after a Wall Street Journal report into alleged sexual misconduct. Although he briefly continued overseeing WWE's creative process, he announced his retirement on July 22.

McMahon returned to WWE on January 6, 2023, after being reappointed to its Board of Directors. Four days later, the Board unanimously elected McMahon to the role of executive Chairman of WWE. On April 3, Endeavor Group Holdings announced a deal under which WWE would merge with the Ultimate Fighting Championship (UFC) to form a new publicly traded company trading under the symbol "TKO"; the merger was completed on September 12. McMahon subsequently served as the executive chairman of TKO. Although he served as executive chairman, Endeavor Group Holdings CEO Ari Emanuel prevented McMahon from overseeing WWE's creative team.

On January 26, 2024, one day after The Wall Street Journal published a report regarding allegations of sexual assault against McMahon, he resigned from TKO. In a statement, he said the decision was made "out of respect for the WWE Universe, TKO, shareholders, and business partners". That March, McMahon sold $411.95 million worth of TKO stock amidst allegations of sexual assault, having previously sold shares worth $670.3 million in November. After these transactions, McMahon held approximately 8 million shares of TKO Group's Class A shares.

=== Other business dealings ===
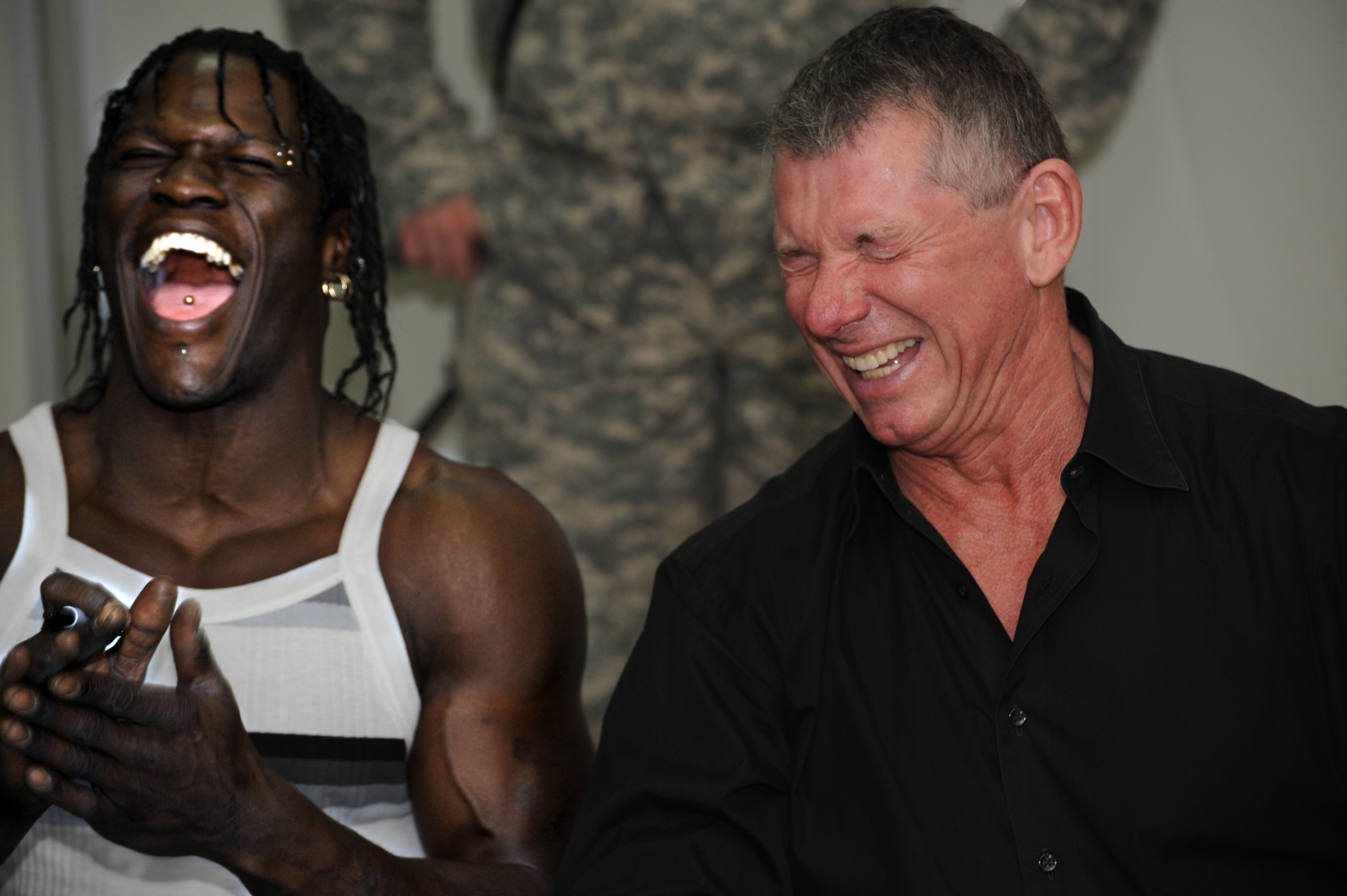
McMahon sharing a joke with R-Truth at the 2008 Tribute to the Troops event

In 1979, Vince and Linda purchased the Cape Cod Coliseum and the Cape Cod Buccaneers of the Atlantic Coast Hockey League. In addition to pro wrestling and hockey, they began selling out rock concerts (including Van Halen and Rush) in non-summer months; the time was traditionally considered unprofitable due to lack of tourists. This venture led the McMahons to join the International Association of Arena Managers, learning the details of the arena business and networking with other managers through IAAM conferences, which Linda later called a great benefit to WWE's success.

McMahon has worked as a film producer beginning in 1989 with No Holds Barred. In 2002, he established WWE Studios.

In 1990, McMahon founded the World Bodybuilding Federation. The organization held two pay-per-view events at the Trump Taj Mahal before closing in July 1992.

In 2000, McMahon again ventured outside the world of professional wrestling by launching the XFL, a professional American football league. The league began in February 2001, with McMahon making an appearance at the first game, but folded after one season due to low television ratings. In 2017, McMahon established Alpha Entertainment, a separate entity from WWE which subsequently acquired XFL trademarks. McMahon officially announced a resurrection of the XFL on January 25, 2018. After only five weeks of play in its inaugural 2020 season, the league abruptly ceased play due to the COVID-19 pandemic, and filed for bankruptcy on April 13, 2020.

In 2025, McMahon established 14th & I, an investment firm and "entertainment hub company" pursuing opportunities in media and sports entertainment.

=== Charity work ===
Vince and Linda McMahon donated over $8 million in 2008, giving grants to the Fishburne Military School, Sacred Heart University, and East Carolina University. Nonprofit Quarterly noted the majority of the McMahons' donations were toward capital expenditures. In 2006, they paid $2.5 million for construction of a tennis facility in Ebensburg, Pennsylvania. The McMahons have supported the Special Olympics since 1986, first developing an interest through their friendship with NBC producer Dick Ebersol and Susan Saint James, who encouraged them to participate.

== Professional wrestling career ==
=== WWE and predecessors (1969–2024) ===
==== Commentator (1969–1997) ====
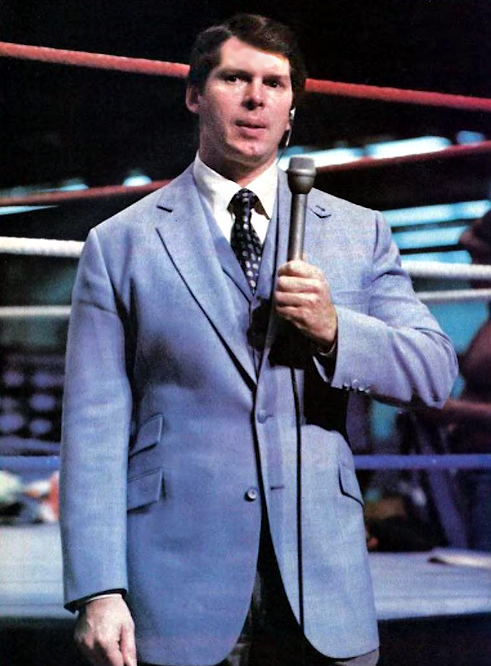
McMahon as a commentator, c. 1986

In 1969, McMahon began appearing at WWWF events as a ring announcer. McMahon made his commentary debut in 1971, replacing Ray Morgan after Morgan had a pay dispute shortly before a scheduled television taping. As a commentator, McMahon was a fan favorite "voice of the fans", a contrast to the heel color commentator, usually Jesse Ventura, Bobby Heenan or Jerry Lawler. McMahon maintained his role as an announcer until November 1997. His ownership of the company was considered an open secret through the mid-1990s, although it was not referenced on television.

In addition to calling matches, McMahon hosted other WWF shows, including the talk show Tuesday Night Titans. He also introduced WWF programing on TBS during Black Saturday in 1984, upon the WWF's acquisition of Georgia Championship Wrestling and its lucrative Saturday night timeslot. However, McMahon sold the time slot to Jim Crockett Promotions after the move proved to be unsuccessful with the established audience.

==== Feud with Stone Cold Steve Austin (1997–1999) ====
Throughout late 1996 and into 1997, McMahon slowly began to be referred to as the owner on WWF television while remaining as the company's lead play-by-play commentator. During this time he had multiple on-screen conflicts with Bret Hart and Stone Cold Steve Austin, laying the groundwork for the eventual Austin-McMahon rivalry. At Survivor Series in 1997, McMahon orchestrated the Montreal Screwjob, ordering the referee to ring the bell while Hart was in a Sharpshooter applied by Shawn Michaels despite not submitting, screwing Hart out of the WWF Championship. The incident marked the beginning of McMahon's transformation into the villainous Mr. McMahon character and his permanent departure from the commentary table to become the promotion's primary on-screen authority figure.

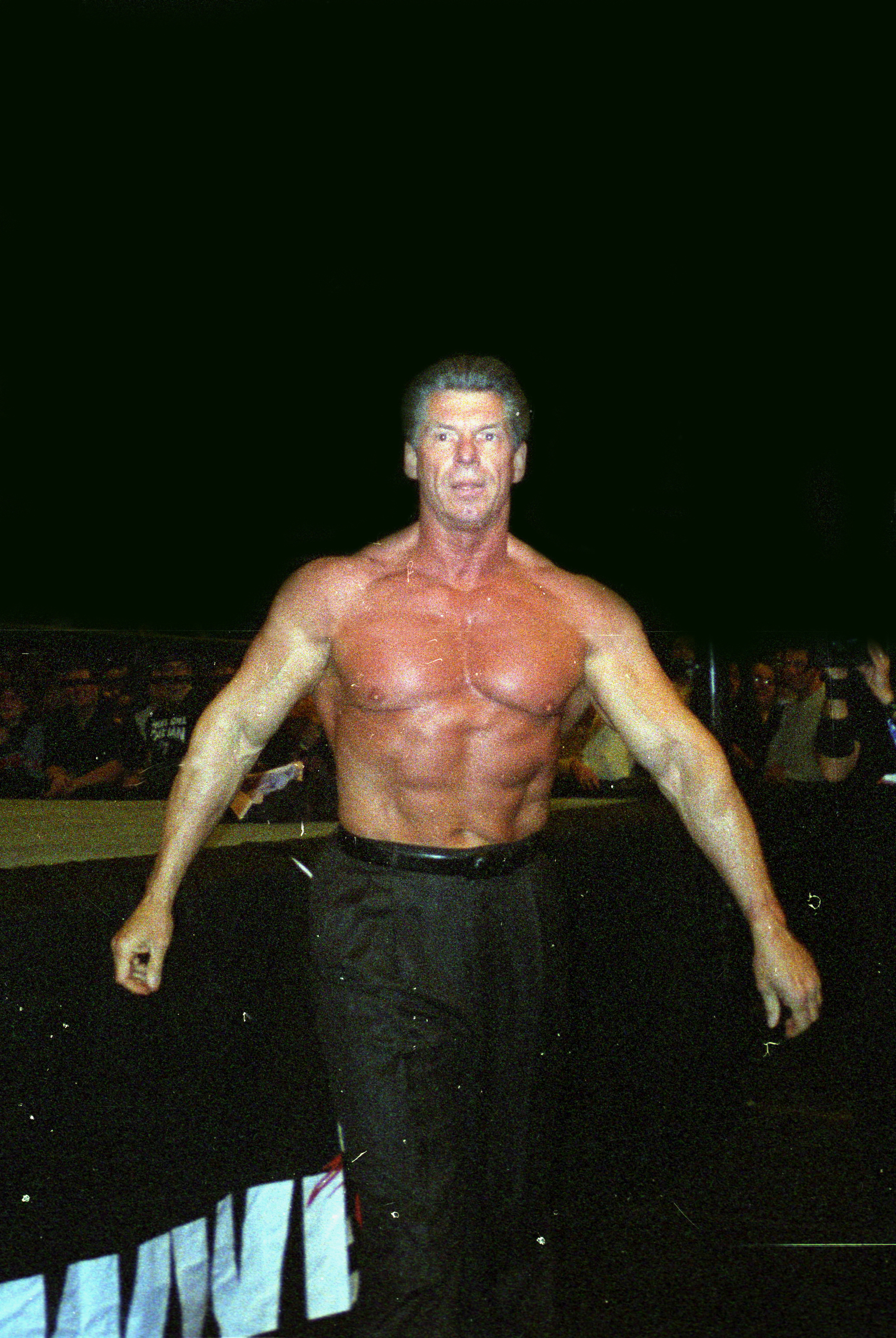
McMahon after a match

As the tyrannical boss of the WWF, McMahon's character routinely criticized fan favorite Steve Austin for his anti-establishment behavior and attitude. After Austin defeated Michaels for the WWF Championship at WrestleMania XIV, McMahon aligned with Mick Foley's Dude Love persona, with Austin retaining his championship in matches against him at Unforgiven and Over the Edge: In Your House. The title was later declared vacant after The Undertaker and Kane, whom McMahon supported, both pinned Austin at the same time at Breakdown: In Your House. McMahon subsequently made a match at Judgment Day: In Your House between The Undertaker and Kane with Austin as the special referee; during the match, Austin declared himself the winner after counting a double pinfall three count for both men. McMahon ordered the still vacant WWF Championship to be defended in a 14-man tournament named Deadly Games at Survivor Series in 1998. During the event, McMahon turned on Foley (now in his Mankind persona) after a screwjob, as The Rock had caught Mankind in the Sharpshooter. McMahon referred to The Rock as the "Corporate Champion", thus forming The Corporation with his son Shane and The Rock.

The 1999 Royal Rumble match saw McMahon emerge victorious after eliminating Austin last with assistance from The Rock, earning a shot at the WWF Championship. WWF Commissioner Shawn Michaels subsequently awarded the Royal Rumble winner's title shot to Austin, but Austin decided to put his title shot on the line against McMahon so he could get a chance to fight Vince at In Your House: St. Valentine's Day Massacre in a steel cage match. During the match, Big Show — a future member of the Corporation — interrupted, making his WWF debut. He threw Austin through the side of the cage thus giving him the victory.

McMahon later started a feud with The Undertaker's Ministry of Darkness faction, during which time McMahon's daughter Stephanie debuted as an on-screen character who was kidnapped by The Ministry. During the storyline, The Undertaker attempted to forcibly marry her, but she was saved by Steve Austin. This caused a brief cooling in the feud between McMahon and Austin. Shane subsequently took control of the Corporation from Vince and merged it with the Ministry of Darkness to form the Corporate Ministry, uniting both factions against Austin. On the June 7 episode of Raw Is War, McMahon was revealed as the "Higher Power" who had been controlling the Corporate Ministry, reigniting his feud with Austin. Linda and Stephanie subsequently gave their controlling interest of the company to Austin, but Vince and Shane defeated Austin in a handicap ladder match at King of the Ring to regain control of the WWF. The following month, McMahon was briefly banned from WWF television following Fully Loaded, where Austin defeated The Undertaker in a match stipulating that Austin would be barred from challenging for the WWF Championship again if he lost, while McMahon would be banned from appearing on WWF television if Austin won.

==== McMahon family storylines (1999–2001) ====
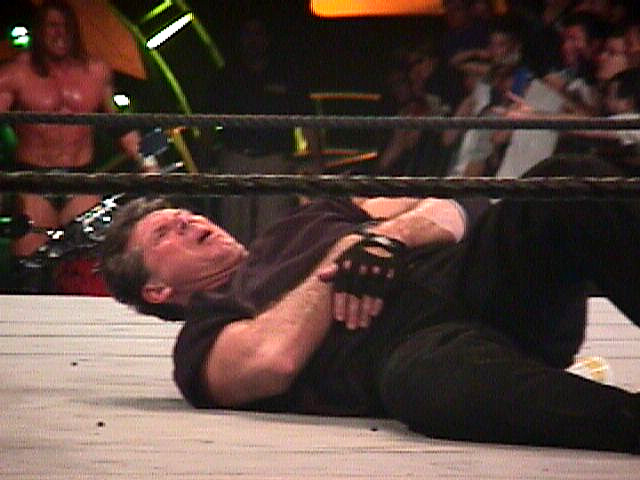
McMahon after losing his match at King of the Ring in June 2000

McMahon returned as a fan favorite in the fall of 1999 and won the WWF Championship on the September 16 episode of SmackDown! after champion Triple H challenged him to a match and Steve Austin interfered on his behalf. He vacated the title on the following Raw is War because of the stipulations of the Fully Loaded contract, although Austin later reinstated him in return for a WWF title shot. Over the next few months, McMahon and Triple H continued their feud, with the linchpin of the storyline being Triple H's marriage to Stephanie. Their feud culminated at Armageddon, where McMahon was defeated in a No Holds Barred match before being attacked by Stephanie. He then walked away from WWF television, unable to accept the union between Triple H and Stephanie. This left Triple H and Stephanie as the ruling on-screen authority figures.

McMahon returned to WWF television on the March 13, 2000, episode of Raw Is War, helping The Rock regain his WWF Championship opportunity from Big Show and challenging Triple H and Stephanie's control of the show. At WrestleMania 2000 on April 2, Triple H defended the WWF Championship in a Fatal Four-Way Elimination match in which each competitor had a McMahon in his corner. Triple H had Stephanie in his corner, The Rock had Vince in his corner, Mick Foley had Linda in his corner, and Big Show had Shane in his corner. During the match, Vince turned on The Rock, helping Triple H retain his title and returning to his heel persona. At King of the Ring on June 25, McMahon, Shane, and Triple H took on The Brothers of Destruction (The Undertaker and Kane) and The Rock in a six-man tag team match for the WWF Championship, with the stipulation that whoever scored the pinfall would become the WWF Champion; McMahon was pinned by The Rock.

In early 2001, McMahon began a storyline involving an extramarital affair with Trish Stratus, which led to a feud with Shane. During the angle, Linda had a nervous breakdown after Vince demanded a divorce; the breakdown left her helpless and sedated. At WrestleMania X-Seven on April 1, Vince lost to Shane after Linda hit him with a low blow. Later that night, McMahon allied with Steve Austin, helping him defeat The Rock to regain the WWF Championship. Bleacher Report describes the alliance with Austin as "the end of the Attitude Era as fans knew it".

==== WCW/ECW Invasion and the brand extension (2001–2005) ====
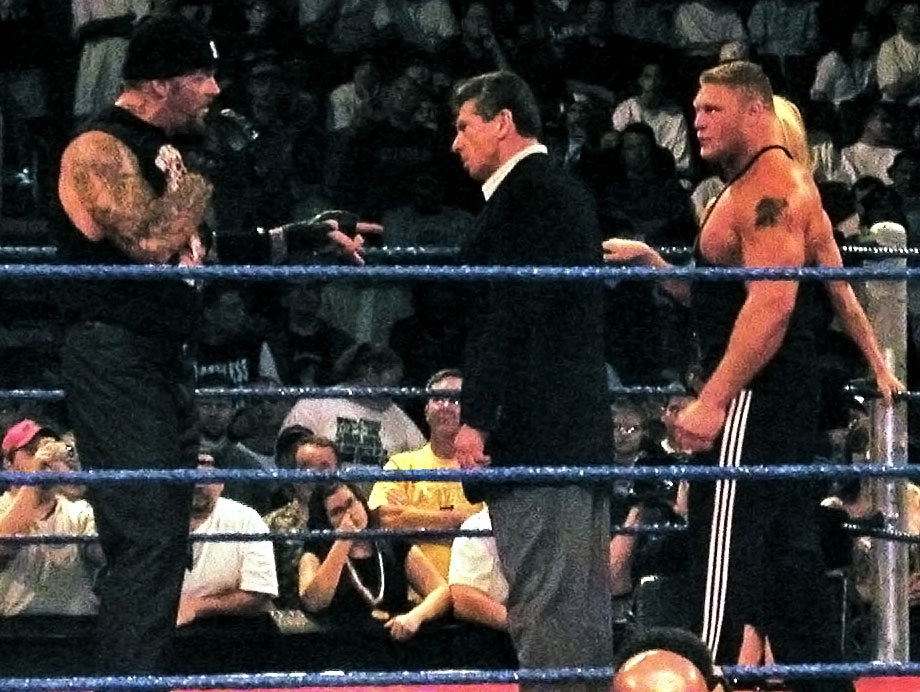
The Undertaker, McMahon, Brock Lesnar and Sable on SmackDown!

McMahon purchased WCW in March from AOL Time Warner and signed many wrestlers from WCW. This marked the beginning of the Invasion storyline, in which the former WCW wrestlers joined with ECW alumni to form The Alliance in an attempt to take over the WWF. During the storyline, Shane ran WCW and Stephanie ran ECW; Vince led Team WWF thus turning face. The storyline concluded at Survivor Series on November 18, with Team WWF defeating Team Alliance in a Survivor Series elimination match.

Following the collapse of The Alliance, McMahon created the "Kiss My Ass Club", which consisted of various WWE individuals being ordered to kiss his buttocks in the middle of the ring, usually with the threat of suspension or firing if they refused reverting to a heel. The club was originally proclaimed closed by The Rock after McMahon was forced to kiss Rikishi's buttocks on an episode of SmackDown!. Meanwhile, McMahon entered into a feud with Ric Flair, who returned to WWF after Survivor Series as the storyline co-owner of the WWF. The two faced each other at the Royal Rumble on January 20, 2002, in a Street Fight which Flair won. The first brand extension began during this time, with McMahon controlling SmackDown!, while Flair owned Raw. On the June 10 episode of Raw, McMahon defeated Flair to end the rivalry and become the sole owner of WWE.

Throughout early 2003, McMahon feuded with Hulk Hogan in a feud promoted as "20 Years in the Making". At WrestleMania XIX on March 30, McMahon lost to Hogan in a Street Fight. The feud continued after WrestleMania, with Hogan briefly taking on the masked persona of Mr. America after McMahon suspended him, but the feud was cut short when Hogan quit WWE. Later that year, he defeated Stephanie in an "I Quit" match at No Mercy on October 19 after Linda threw in the towel on behalf of her daughter, removing her as General Manager of SmackDown. He then began a feud with The Undertaker, ultimately defeating him in a Buried Alive match at Survivor Series on November 16 with help from Kane.

==== Feuds with DX, Bobby Lashley and faked death (2005–2008) ====
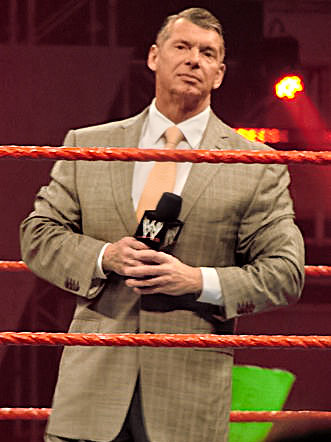
McMahon during a Raw episode in 2007

McMahon returned to television as a regular character in late 2005 after firing Raw General Manager Eric Bischoff. He then feuded with Shawn Michaels, losing to him in a No Holds Barred match at WrestleMania 22 on April 2, 2006. At Backlash on April 30, Vince and Shane McMahon defeated Michaels and "God" (characterized by a spotlight) in another No Holds Barred match. After Triple H reunited with Michaels to reform D-Generation X, the McMahons lost to them at SummerSlam on August 20, and the feud concluded at Unforgiven on September 17, where DX defeated the McMahons and Big Show in a Hell in a Cell match.

In January 2007, McMahon began the "Battle of the Billionaires" feud with Donald Trump, which culminated at WrestleMania 23 on April 1 when his representative Umaga lost to Bobby Lashley in a match with McMahon's hair on the line, resulting in his head being shaved. McMahon continued his rivalry with Lashley after WrestleMania, defeating him for the ECW World Championship at Backlash on April 29 in a 3-on-1 handicap match with Shane and Umaga by his side. At Judgment Day on May 20, McMahon defended the championship against Lashley again in another 3-on-1 handicap match, losing the match but retaining on a technicality. His reign ended at One Night Stand on June 3 after Lashley defeated him in a Street Fight.

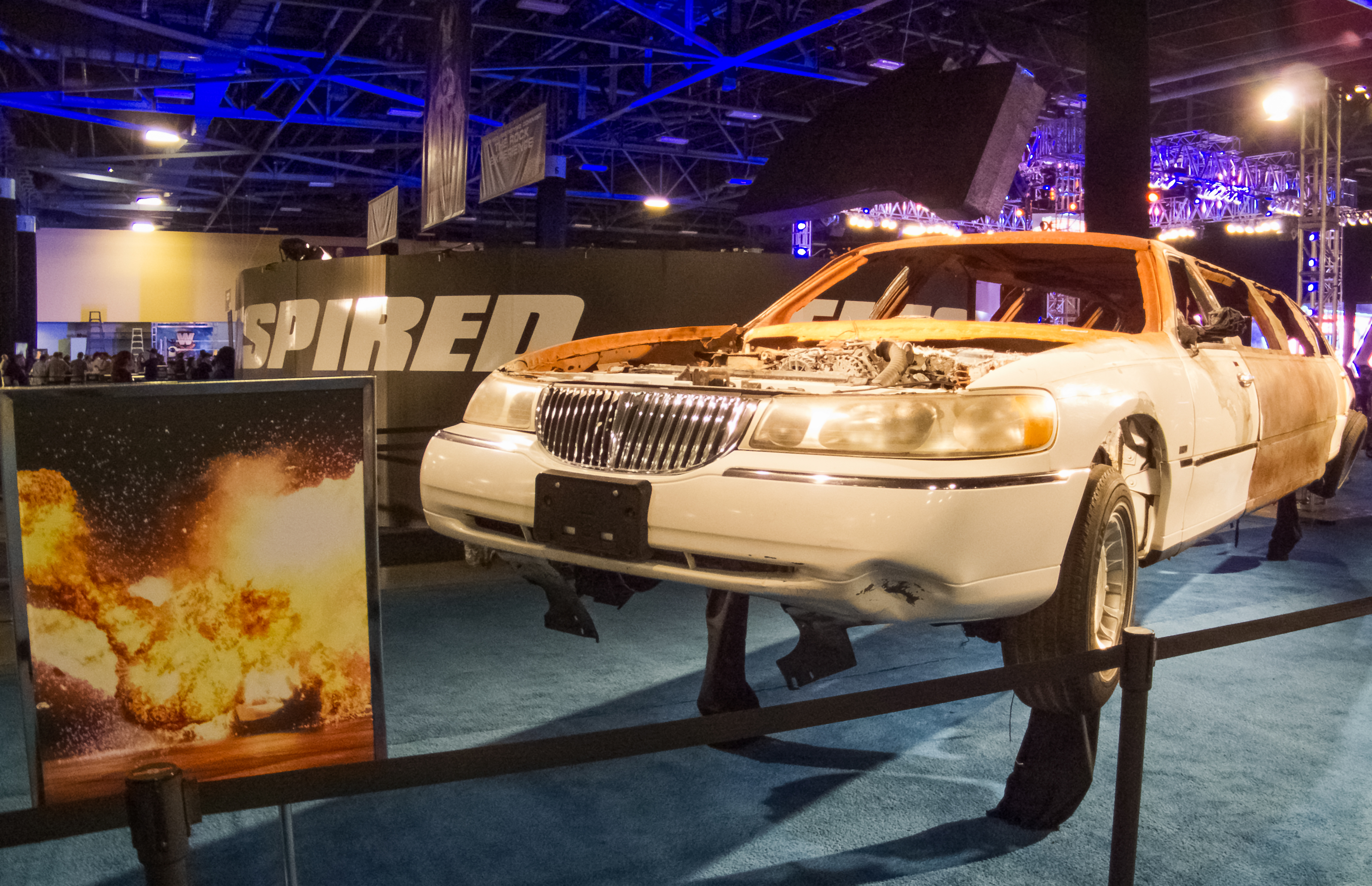
The exploded limousine at WrestleMania Axxess in 2012

The Mr. McMahon character was seemingly killed off on the June 11 episode of Raw, in a segment that featured McMahon entering a limousine moments before it exploded. A three-hour memorial to his character planned for the June 25 episode of Raw was scrapped after the Chris Benoit double-murder and suicide, with McMahon opening the show to announce Benoit's death and confirm that his character's death had been part of a storyline. After a brief hiatus, McMahon returned as part of a storyline involving an illegitimate child that spanned late 2007 and early 2008; Hornswoggle was initially presented as McMahon's child but was later revealed as Finlay's. McMahon was written off television again on the June 23 episode of Raw after celebratory explosions tied to the "Million Dollar Mania" prize giveaway caused the stage to collapse on top of him.

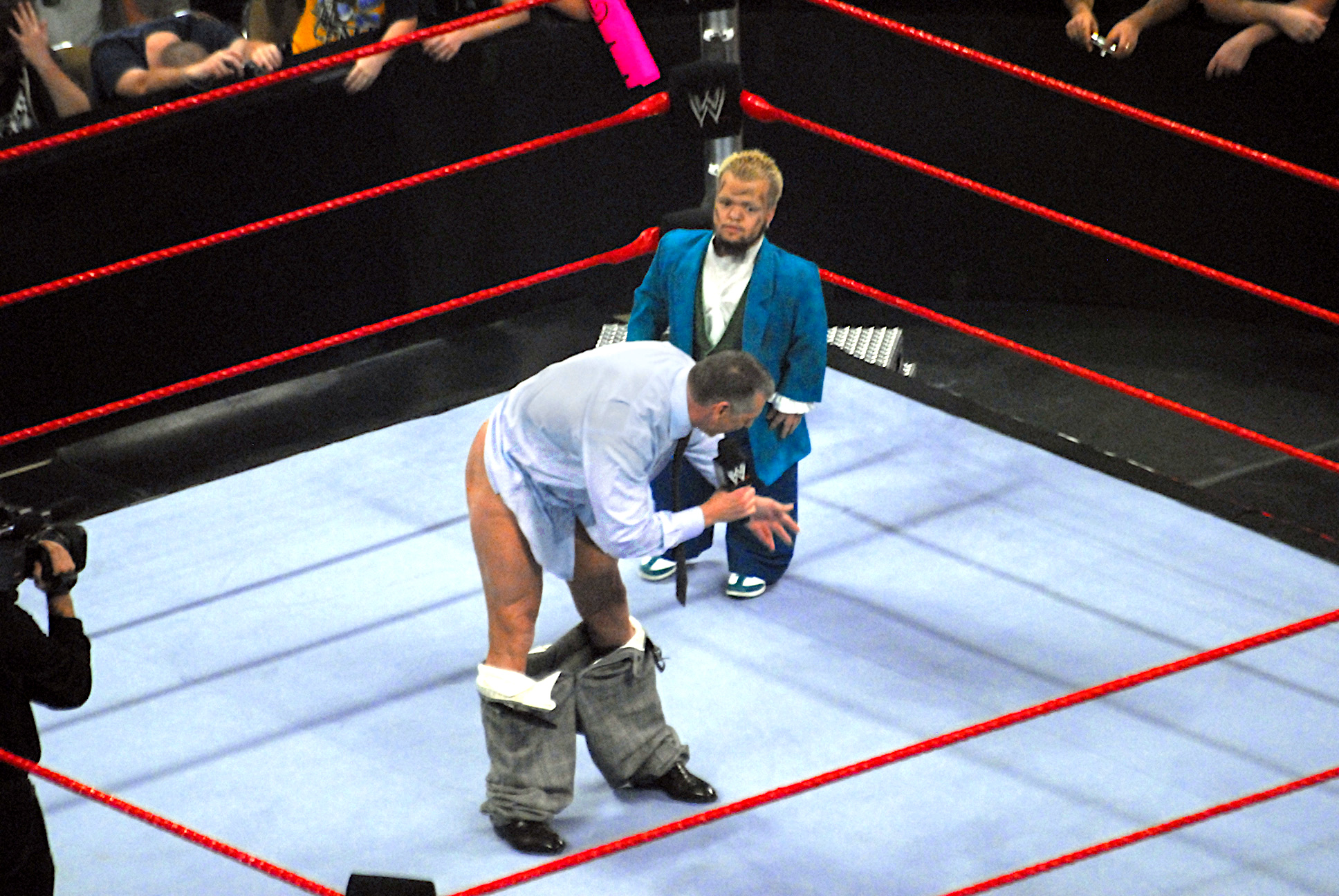
McMahon commands Hornswoggle to join his "Kiss My Ass Club" in 2008.

==== Sporadic appearances and retirement (2009–2022) ====
During the later stage of McMahon's career, he made intermittent onscreen appearances, typically returning only for major storyline developments rather than appearing regularly throughout the year. Several other authority figures were used in his place, including Vickie Guerrero, Raw guest hosts, the Anonymous Raw General Manager and John Laurinaitis.

McMahon made a series of appearances in 2009, allying with Stephanie in her storyline with Chris Jericho and with Triple H during his feud against Randy Orton. His next major feud was with Bret Hart following Hart's 2010 return to WWE for the first time since the Montreal Screwjob in 1997, losing to him at WrestleMania XXVI in a No Holds Barred Lumberjack match. Later that year, an attack by The Nexus left his character in a coma for an extended period. Upon returning, he had prominent involvement in the storylines surrounding Money in the Bank 2011, after CM Punk criticized the company under McMahon's leadership during his "pipebomb" promo. McMahon later wrestled CM Punk and Paul Heyman on Raw in 2012 and 2013 respectively, with both matches descending into chaotic, interference-filled brawls.

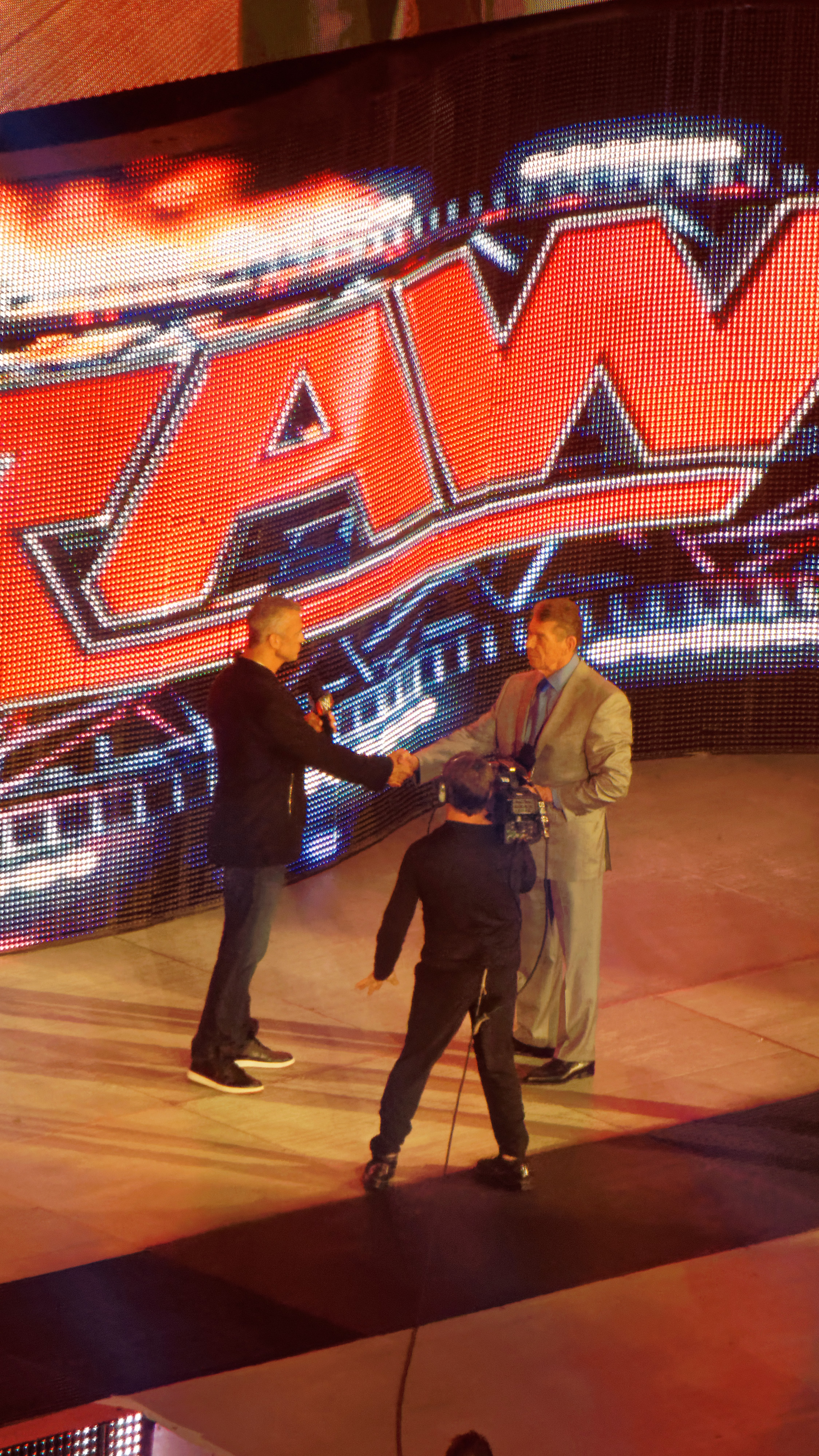
Vince and Shane McMahon on Raw in 2016

Beginning in mid-2013, McMahon aligned himself with Triple H and Stephanie's new faction, The Authority, which became the promotion's controlling onscreen regime. In December 2015, McMahon took control of the group and feuded with Roman Reigns. Upon the disbandment of The Authority and the return of Shane to the promotion in 2016, McMahon reinstated the brand extension, with Shane acting as commissioner of SmackDown and Stephanie controlling Raw. McMahon continued to make occasional appearances in storylines, including being attacked by Kevin Owens during Owens' feud with Shane on the September 5, 2017, episode of SmackDown. Over the next few years, most of McMahon's appearances were ceremonial in nature, including milestone celebrations and major WWE events.

McMahon began what turned out to be his last WWE storyline in late 2021, serving in a mentorship role for Austin Theory. He wrestled his last match at WrestleMania 38 in April 2022, defeating Pat McAfee in an impromptu match after McAfee had defeated Theory. After the match, McMahon and Theory each received Stone Cold Stunners from Steve Austin. His last appearance on WWE programming was on the June 27, 2022, episode of Raw, introducing the returning John Cena on the 20th anniversary of his debut. In July 2022, McMahon retired from WWE. Despite returning in an executive role the following year, McMahon stated in an interview with Ari Emanuel that "Mr McMahon is dead", signifying the permanent end to the character.

=== United States Wrestling Association (1993) ===
While the Mr. McMahon character marked the first time that McMahon had been portrayed as a villain in WWF, in 1993, McMahon was engaged in a feud with Jerry Lawler as part of a cross-promotion between the WWF and the United States Wrestling Association (USWA). As part of the angle, McMahon sent various WWF wrestlers to Memphis to dethrone Lawler as the "king of professional wrestling". This angle marked the first time that McMahon physically interjected himself into a match, as he occasionally tripped and punched at Lawler while seated ringside. During the angle, McMahon was not acknowledged as the owner of the WWF.

The feud was not acknowledged on WWF television, as the two continued to provide commentary together (along with Randy Savage) for the television show Superstars. The feud also helped build toward Lawler's match with Bret Hart at SummerSlam. The peak of the angle came with Tatanka defeating Lawler to win the USWA Championship with McMahon gloating at Lawler while wearing the championship belt. This storyline came to an abrupt end when Lawler was accused of raping a young girl in Memphis, and he was dropped from the WWF. He returned shortly afterward, as the girl later stated that the rape accusations were lies.

== Professional wrestling style and persona ==
McMahon's on-screen persona is known for his throaty exclamation of "You're fired!", and his "power walk", an exaggerated strut toward the ring, swinging his arms and bobbing his head from side to side in a cocky manner. According to Jim Cornette, the power walk was inspired by one of McMahon's favorite wrestlers as a child, Dr. Jerry Graham. The Fabulous Moolah claims in her autobiography that "Nature Boy" Buddy Rogers was the inspiration for the walk. According to composer Jim Johnston, the idea behind his theme song, "No Chance in Hell", was "He's got the power, the money, and ..., he was pretty much the only game in town. ... Rather than a song about one man, I wanted it to be about 'The Man.'"

== Legacy in wrestling ==
=== Impact on entertainment and culture ===
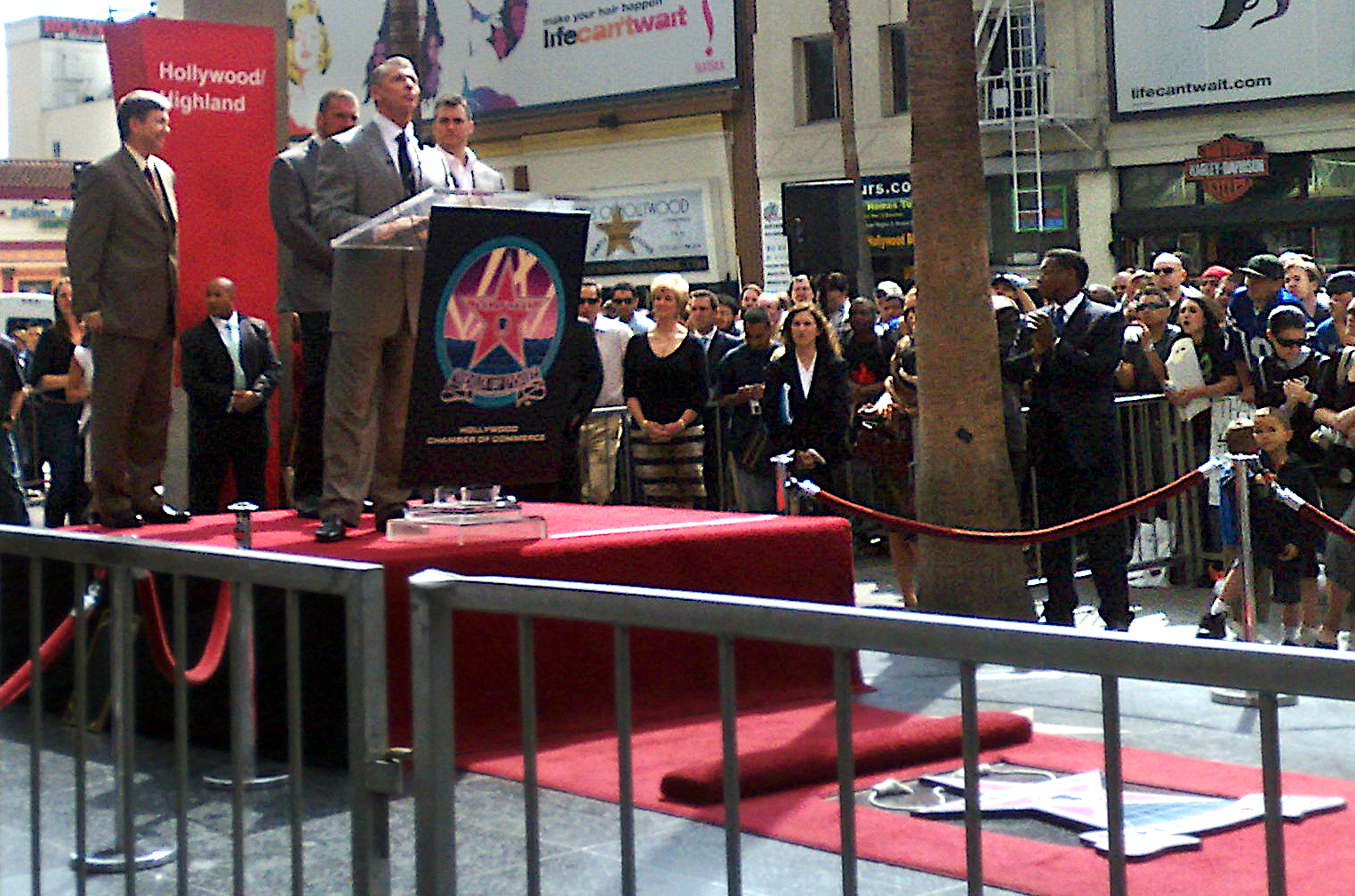
McMahon receiving a star on the Hollywood Walk of Fame in 2008

McMahon is often described as the most influential person in professional wrestling history and for having had a large impact on television and American culture. ESPN reporter Shaun Assael claimed that: "As a TV pioneer, he went from selling costumed super-heroes like Hulk Hogan to dark anti-heroes like Steve Austin. He helped give birth to reality television by making himself a central character, and he launched The Rock into a movie career. No one in television can match his longevity. Few have his instincts for what sells."

Scott Hammond of VultureHound magazine praised the legacy of McMahon's successes, from Hulkamania and WrestleMania being essential to the 1980s wrestling boom, to defeating WCW in the Monday Night Wars. Stephanie McMahon credits him for creating the term "sports entertainment" and publicly acknowledging wrestling's predetermined nature, while Thom Loverro of The Washington Times ascribes McMahon with shaping reality television and American politics with sports entertainment. Television executive Dick Ebersol considers McMahon to be the best partner he has worked with and believes he has impacted American culture.

McMahon's close friend and former on-screen rival, Donald Trump, praised McMahon, stating: "People love this stuff, and it's all because of Vince McMahon and his vision." Promoter and former WWF manager Jim Cornette called McMahon "the most successful promoter ever", stating: "If you could cross a genius with P. T. Barnum and [Trump], you would get the love child that would be Vince McMahon." Tony Khan, the promoter of rival promotion All Elite Wrestling (AEW), considers McMahon to be one of his idols, while former WCW President Eric Bischoff describes him as "brilliant".

=== Reaction to later career and controversies ===
Although Hammond praised McMahon for his successes from the 1980s through the 2000s, he wrote that, "from seemingly listening to the fans and pushing the talent that got the biggest reaction to just listening to himself, McMahon has therefore taken many wrong turns in recent years". Jon Moxley, who wrestled for WWE as Dean Ambrose, left WWE in favor of then-upstart AEW because of WWE's creative process in 2019 and singled out McMahon for being the problem. WWE recorded record annual profits into the 2020s, which MarketWatch reported had come at the cost of "A diminished roster and less-than-inspiring story lines"; by 2022, Bryan Alvarez of Wrestling Observer Newsletter commented that wrestling had declined in popularity due to the dwindling viewership since McMahon purchased WCW. A 2020 article in Variety also blamed McMahon for the continuous decrease in ratings over the years and urged investors to hold him accountable. Other criticisms of McMahon include Arn Anderson and Bret Hart commenting that McMahon has minimized tag team wrestling, while Assael also writes that "Steroids will always be a part of [his] legacy" because of his legal trial and the controversies that arose in the aftermath of Chris Benoit's death.

The sexual misconduct allegations that forced McMahon to exit WWE have affected his legacy. Dave Meltzer of the Wrestling Observer Newsletter noted that, despite McMahon's historic business success, he "is likely to have his lasting memory, like Harvey Weinstein, as a loathsome sexual predator as opposed to the architect of a multi-billion dollar business." Bret Hart also compared McMahon to Weinstein, stating that McMahon will "always be associated with this story", and apologized for not believing earlier accusations against him. Conversely, Jim Ross said that while the accusations would impact McMahon's legacy, he did not think the effect would be "earth-shattering" due to McMahon's accomplishments. Despite the scandal, several wrestling stars continued to speak highly of McMahon, including Hulk Hogan, Steve Austin, and John Cena.

=== Friendships and influence ===
The Undertaker has praised McMahon, referring to Vince as "a caring human being, not the monster that people think that he is, I've never taken for granted the special opportunity he gave me, If Vince feels like there's still something there, I have a place on the roster, then I had no problem doing it". Jim Ross has stated that "People misunderstand Mr. McMahon and Vince McMahon. It's a lot easier to bitch at somebody and knock them as Mr. McMahon than understand the human being that is Vince McMahon."

Drew McIntyre, Kurt Angle, Dwayne Johnson and John Cena praise him as being a father figure to them. Steve Austin says that he loves and respects McMahon, despite a previous acrimonious relationship at times. Chris Jericho has praised McMahon stating "he's set in his ways of doing things and they're very successful", while Seth Rollins praised his ideas and longevity and Roman Reigns described him as a "provider and a protector" and said that he and his coworkers are grateful for him.

=== In popular culture ===
On September 25, 2024, Netflix released a documentary series detailing aspects of McMahon's legacy, including his business impact and controversies, titled Mr. McMahon.

== Steroid supplier trial ==
In November 1993, McMahon was indicted in federal court after a steroid controversy engulfed the promotion and thus temporarily ceded control of the WWF to his wife Linda. The case went to trial in 1994, where McMahon was accused of distributing steroids to his wrestlers. One prosecution witness was Kevin Wacholz, who had wrestled for the company in 1992 as "Nailz" and who had been fired after a violent confrontation with McMahon. Wacholz testified that McMahon had ordered him to use steroids, but his credibility was called into question during his testimony as he made it clear he "hated" McMahon. In July 1994, the jury acquitted McMahon of the charges.

On July 6, 2021, production was announced on a new scripted television series called The United States of America vs. Vince McMahon centered around the case. The series is produced by a partnership of WWE Studios and Blumhouse Television and executive produced by McMahon and Kevin Dunn, WWE Executive Producer and Chief of Global Television Distribution.

== Sexual misconduct allegations ==
McMahon has faced multiple sexual misconduct allegations since 1992. In 1992, former referee Rita Chatterton alleged that McMahon raped her in his limousine. Later that year, wrestler Kevin Wacholz, who later testified against McMahon at his criminal trial, filed a lawsuit which alleged McMahon sexually assaulted him. McMahon filed a counter-lawsuit against Wacholz, and also sued Chatterton for defamation; he later dropped the lawsuit in order to focus on defending himself against upcoming federal criminal steroid charges. McMahon later settled with Chatterton for an undisclosed amount in 2022 with his attorney stating that he maintains his innocence but settled to "avoid the cost of litigation".

McMahon was accused of sexual harassment by a worker at a tanning bar in Boca Raton, Florida, on February 1, 2006. McMahon was investigated but the state opted not to file charges, citing insufficient evidence. Another allegation involving a separate tanning spa worker, who alleged that McMahon sexually assaulted her in California in 2011, was first reported in 2022.

In June 2022, The Wall Street Journal first reported on a $3 million hush-money settlement stemming from an affair with a former WWE employee, later revealed to be Janel Grant. WWE subsequently conducted an internal investigation, revealing other nondisclosure agreements related to misconduct claims by other women in the company against McMahon and executive John Laurinaitis; by October 2022, WWE disclosed $14.6 million in unrecorded payments McMahon made to settle sexual misconduct claims between 2006 and 2022. McMahon had announced his retirement on July 22, but he returned to WWE in January 2023.

Grant filed a lawsuit in January 2024, alleging that McMahon had sexually trafficked and assaulted her during 2020–2021. Grant stated that McMahon had agreed to pay her $3 million in 2022 in return for an nondisclosure agreement, but stopped paying after only $1 million had been paid following the initial public reporting of the sexual misconduct allegations that same year. One day after the allegations were made public, McMahon resigned from TKO. On May 30, Grant agreed to "stay her case" against McMahon for six months at the request of the Department of Justice, which had launched an investigation into the allegations involving McMahon. On January 10, 2025, it was announced that McMahon was fined over $1.7 million by the Securities and Exchange Commission for failing to disclose hush-money payments. Grant and McMahon filed a joint motion to dismiss the lawsuit on July 24, 2026, moving the case to be resolved through private arbitration.

== Personal life ==
=== Wealth ===
McMahon has accumulated substantial personal wealth over the course of his business career. As of 2006, he owned a $12 million penthouse in Manhattan, a $40 million estate in Greenwich, Connecticut, a $20 million vacation property, and a 47-foot yacht named Sexy Bitch. His net worth has fluctuated alongside the fortunes of WWE, particularly its publicly traded stock. He first appeared on the Forbes list of billionaires in 2001, but was removed from the list in subsequent years. In 2015, he reentered the rankings with an estimated net worth of $1.2 billion. By 2018, his wealth was estimated at $3.6 billion.

=== Political activity ===
McMahon and his wife have been long-standing supporters of Republican political causes. In 2014, they donated approximately $1 million to federal candidates and political action committees, including American Crossroads and the research group America Rising. They also donated $5 million to the Donald J. Trump Foundation, the now-defunct charitable organization affiliated with Donald Trump.

=== Driving accidents ===
In July 1999, McMahon was involved in an accident with a car while joyriding his motorcycle, suffering a broken tailbone and a separated pelvis. In March 2017, McMahon was involved in a crash. On July 24, 2025, McMahon was speeding at 100 to 115 miles per hour (161 to 185 km/h) in Connecticut and crashed his Bentley, with the crash involving three vehicles. There were no serious injuries. In October 2025, he was sentenced to one year of Connecticut's Accelerated Rehabilitation program, and a $1,000 charitable donation with the charges being dismissed after a year if completed.

== Filmography ==
Year	Title	Role	Notes
2014	Scooby-Doo! WrestleMania Mystery	Mr. McMahon	Voice
2015	The Flintstones & WWE: Stone Age SmackDown!	Mr. McMagma	Voice
2016	Camp WWE	Mr. McMahon	Voice
2016	Scooby-Doo! and WWE: Curse of the Speed Demon	Mr. McMahon	Voice
2017	Surf's Up 2: WaveMania	Mr. McMahon	Voice
2017	The Jetsons & WWE: Robo-WrestleMania!	Mr. McMahon	Voice
2024	Mr. McMahon	Himself	Documentary

== Championships and accomplishments ==
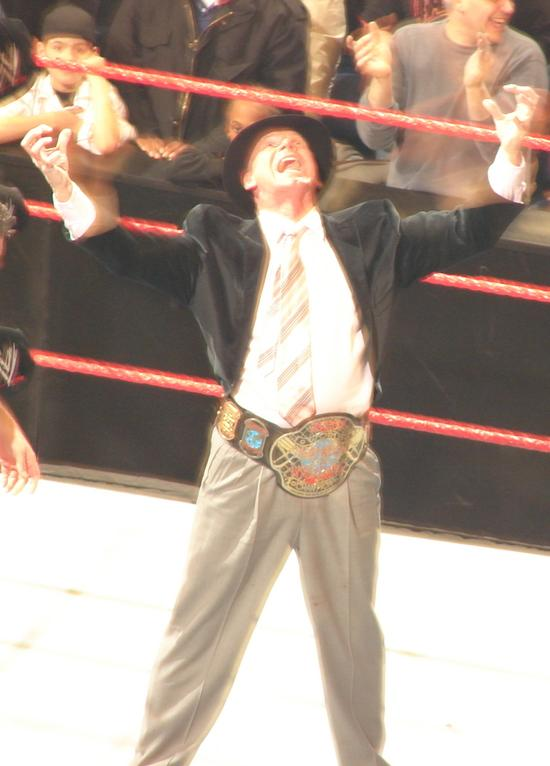
McMahon as the ECW World Champion in 2007

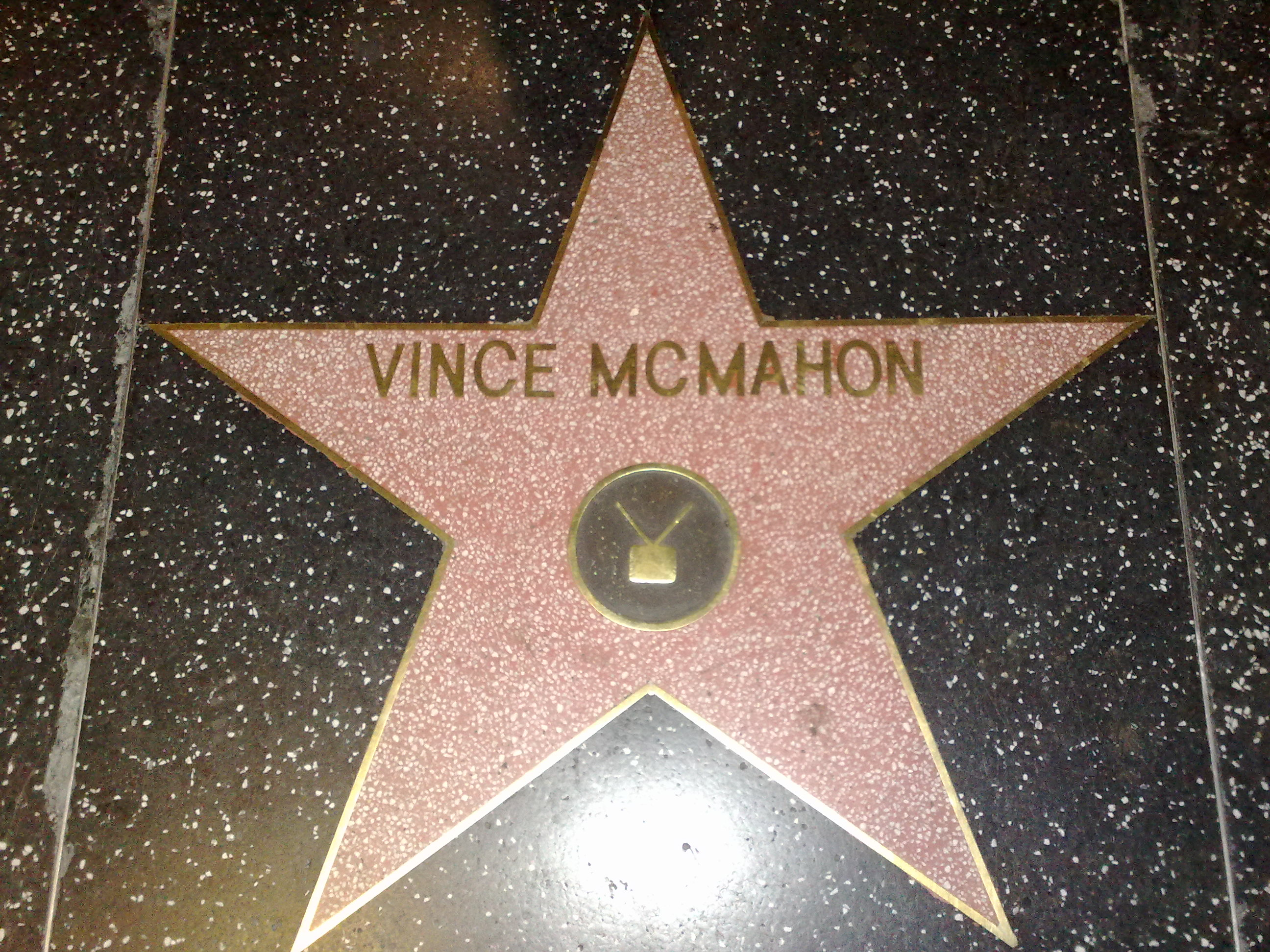
McMahon's star on the Hollywood Walk of Fame

- The Baltimore Sun
  - Best Non-Wrestling Performer of the Decade (2010)
- Professional Wrestling Hall of Fame and Museum
  - Class of 2011
- Pro Wrestling Illustrated
  - Feud of the Year (1996) vs. Eric Bischoff
  - Feud of the Year (1998, 1999) vs. Stone Cold Steve Austin
  - Feud of the Year (2001) vs. Shane McMahon
  - Match of the Year (2006) vs. Shawn Michaels in a No Holds Barred match at WrestleMania 22
- World Wrestling Federation/World Wrestling Entertainment
  - WWF Championship (1 time)
  - ECW World Championship (1 time)
  - Royal Rumble (1999)
- Wrestling Observer Newsletter awards
  - Best Booker (1987, 1998, 1999)
  - Promoter of the Year (1988, 1998–2000)
  - Best Non-Wrestler (1999, 2000)
  - Feud of the Year (1998, 1999) vs. Stone Cold Steve Austin
  - Most Disgusting Promotional Tactic (2003) for "McMahons all over the product"
  - Most Disgusting Promotional Tactic (2022) for "appearing on television for a crowd pop after sexual misconduct allegations came out"
  - Most Obnoxious (1983–1986, 1990, 1993)
  - Worst Feud of the Year (2006) with Shane McMahon vs. D-Generation X (Shawn Michaels and Triple H)
  - Worst Match of the Year (2022) vs. Pat McAfee at WrestleMania 38
  - Wrestling Observer Newsletter Hall of Fame (Class of 1996)

=== Other awards and honors ===
- Boys & Girls Clubs of America Hall of Fame (Class of 2015)
- Guinness World Records – Oldest WWE Champion (September 1999)
- Honorary Doctor of Humane Letters degree from Sacred Heart University
- Star on the Hollywood Walk of Fame (2008)
- CableFAX Hall of Fame (2008)
- Promax/BDA Lifetime Achievement Award (2008)

== Notes ==
Business positions
New creation	Executive chairman of WWE/TKO; 2023–2024	Succeeded by Ari Emanuel
New creation	Chairman of Titan Sports/WWF/WWE; 1980–2022	Succeeded by Stephanie McMahon
New creation	President of Titan Sports/WWF; 1980–1993	Succeeded by Linda McMahon
New creation	CEO of Titan Sports/WWF; 1980–1997	Succeeded by Linda McMahon
Preceded by Vincent J. McMahon	Promoter of WWF/WWE; 1982–2022	Succeeded by Stephanie McMahon
Preceded by Linda McMahon	CEO of WWE; 2009–2022	Succeeded by Stephanie McMahon; Nick Khan
New creation	Owner of Alpha Entertainment; 2017–present	Incumbent
New creation	Managing member of 14th & I 2025–present	Incumbent
