= WWE in Saudi Arabia =

Series of professional wrestling events

- Promotions: WWE
- Brands: Raw; SmackDown
- First event: April 2014 tour

WWE, an American professional wrestling promotion based in Stamford, Connecticut, has been promoting events in Saudi Arabia since 2014. After initially holding non-televised house shows, WWE announced a 10-year strategic partnership with the Ministry of Sport in 2018, which would see the hosting of pay-per-view (PPV) and livestreaming events in Saudi Arabia. In 2019, WWE announced it had "expanded" its partnership with the General Entertainment Authority through 2027, under which it would hold two "large-scale events" in the country per-year. These events have been held at venues in Riyadh and Jeddah.

The partnership has faced criticism over Saudi Arabia's poor human rights record (including suppression of women's and LGBT rights), allegations of sportswashing, and the assassination of Saudi journalist Jamal Khashoggi. Some WWE performers have declined or were restricted from participating in the shows due to government policies and political tensions, while members of WWE's women's division were initially barred from performing in the first three events; Crown Jewel in 2019 would eventually feature WWE's first women's match in the country, and Super ShowDown featured its first women's title defense. The Wrestling Observer Newsletter gave the partnership between WWE and Saudi Arabia its yearly "Most Disgusting Promotional Tactic" award in 2018, 2019, and 2024, with four Saudi Arabia WWE events being recipients for Worst Major Wrestling Show between 2018 and 2023.

== History ==
Saudi Arabia had previously been visited by professional wrestling tours - one such tour in 1986 included Tony St. Clair. Other wrestlers who performed on shows in Saudi Arabia included Greek star Georgios Tromaras in 1990.

In December 2013, it was announced that WWE would begin holding shows in Saudi Arabia, and in April 2014, the promotion held their first house shows in Riyadh; these were three separate shows at Green Halls Stadium. In October 2015, WWE held three house shows in Jeddah, at the King Abdullah Sports City Sports Hall. In November 2016, WWE returned to Green Halls Stadium for two non-televised events, which exclusively featured wrestlers from the SmackDown brand. In 2017, WWE launched the Arabic-language recap show, WWE Wal3ooha, which airs in Saudi Arabia. These events were organized in collaboration with Time Entertainment, a Saudi events company led at the time by CEO Héctor Alegre.

On March 5, 2018, WWE and the Saudi General Sports Authority (renamed Ministry of Sport in 2020) advertised the Greatest Royal Rumble, a pay-per-view (PPV) and livestreaming event to be held on April 27, 2018, at King Abdullah International Stadium in Jeddah. The event was announced as the first in a 10-year strategic multi-platform partnership between WWE and the Saudi General Sports Authority in support of Saudi Vision 2030, the country's social and economic reform program.

WWE announced on November 4, 2019, that it had "expanded" its partnership with the General Entertainment Authority through 2027, under which it would hold two "large-scale events" in Saudi Arabia per-year. In addition, Riyadh Season, an entertainment festival that launched in October 2019 also organized by the General Entertainment Authority, would begin hosting the annual Crown Jewel event, as well as WWE Experience, an indoor theme park themed around WWE (named after its former syndicated television program), which launched during the 2023 season and officially opened on February 16, 2024. It was the first WWE theme park since the 2011 closure of the former WWE Niagara Falls.

Since the beginning of the agreement, two PPV and livestreaming events have been held in Saudi Arabia annually. One is held in the first half of the year typically in Jeddah and usually within an existing WWE event chronology, while an annual event known as Crown Jewel was held in late October–early November in Riyadh as part of Riyadh Season. WWE's first major event in Saudi Arabia was Greatest Royal Rumble—a one-off special version of WWE's annual Royal Rumble—on April 27, 2018. Due to the COVID-19 pandemic in Saudi Arabia and WWE's suspension of touring, the Saudi events were suspended after Super ShowDown in February 2020 and returned with Crown Jewel in 2021. The 2025 calendar year featured only one WWE event in Saudi Arabia, while three events were scheduled for 2026. The first of these, the Royal Rumble, took place in 2026 as part of the 2025–2026 Riyadh Season, marking the first time one of WWE's "Big Five" events was held in the country. Saudi Arabia is also scheduled to host WrestleMania 43 in 2027 as part of the 2026–2027 Riyadh Season, which will be the first WrestleMania held outside of North America.

== Broadcast ==
Since January 2025, WWE televised events including Raw and SmackDown are broadcast in Saudi Arabia on Netflix, as part of the global WWE–Netflix deal.

== Controversies ==
=== Women's rights ===
WWE received criticism for holding the events without female wrestlers, who were unable to perform in Saudi Arabia between 2014 and 2019, due to the country's limitation on women's rights. Triple H, WWE's Executive Vice President of Talent, Live Events and Creative, stated: "I understand people are questioning it, but every culture is different and just because you don’t agree with a certain aspect of it, you can’t dictate to a country about how they handle things... WWE is at the forefront of a women’s evolution in the world [and] we have had discussions about [women competing] and hope in the next few years, they will".

Consistent with the change in law for sporting events in 2017, women were able to attend WWE events if accompanied by a male guardian. This was in response to "a series of social changes" by Crown Prince Mohammad bin Salman, who repealed the previous legislation completely banning women from public events. During the Greatest Royal Rumble, WWE aired a promotional video which included female wrestlers in their ring gear. The Saudi General Sports Authority issued an apology for "indecent material" that aired at the event.

During the second Crown Jewel event in 2018, Renee Young provided commentary at the show; she reprised her role at 2019's Super ShowDown. Hours before 2019's Super ShowDown, reports emerged that WWE were attempting to add a women's match, which would have seen Alexa Bliss face Natalya. The two women joined WWE personnel for the trip, but the match was ultimately rejected by the Saudi Arabian government.

On October 30, 2019, WWE announced that a match between Natalya and Lacey Evans had been approved for the 2019 Crown Jewel event, making it the first-ever women's match in Saudi Arabia. At the event, Evans wore a full bodysuit instead of her normal ring attire (with Natalya wearing her regular full bodysuit ring attire) and both wore T-shirts promoting their WWE shirts for sale, due to the country's conservative dress policy. WWE largely celebrated the match as groundbreaking, which they later nominated for a WWE Year-End Award for Moment of the Year, with WWE CBO Stephanie McMahon stating in an interview: "You can either sit on the sidelines and there are plenty of companies and brands that decide to do that or you can be a part of hopefully enacting change. You can be a part of progress. Nothing worthwhile is ever easy. It takes time. It takes perseverance. Now here we are with the first ever women's match in Saudi Arabia. It's pretty mind blowing."

However, reactions from other media outlets were mixed. While some were positive, such as Heavy.com, who stated that the match was "put in place to break barriers and further WWE's 'Women’s Evolution' for the proud ladies in attendance and watching all over the world. And for that, I have to give it the utmost props", or Canoe.com who stated that "The historic match was about and meant so much more [than its result]." Newsweek called the match part of "Crown Prince Mohammed bin Salman's [intent on] luring major sports event [...] to position the ultra-conservative Islamic country as more liberal and diversify its economy away from depending on the oil industry as part of its Saudi Vision 2030 plan", with Saudi Arabian Amnesty International researcher Dana Ahmed calling the match "a prime example how the Saudi Arabian authorities are using elite sports to try to 'sportswash' their dire human rights record and image internationally". CBS Sports criticized Michael Cole's commentary, pointing out that he was "trying to put over the progressiveness of Saudi Arabia" during the match.

At Super ShowDown in 2020, Bayley defended her SmackDown Women's Championship against Naomi, making it the first time a women's championship was defended in Saudi Arabia.

=== Killing of Jamal Khashoggi ===
One month prior to the 2018 edition of Crown Jewel, Saudi Arabia received substantial negative press due to the killing of Jamal Khashoggi at the hands of Saudi agents. This led to the WWE facing calls to cancel the event, with prominent U.S. Democratic and Republican politicians criticizing the company's endeavors in Saudi Arabia. Questions were raised whether because of the position of then-Administrator of the Small Business Administration Linda McMahon, who is married to the WWE Chairman Vince McMahon and a former WWE executive herself, WWE's endeavors in Saudi Arabia could still be viewed as a strictly private business enterprise. Due to this, Democratic Senator Bob Menendez urged the US government to pressure WWE into canceling the event, while Republican Lindsey Graham, among others, called for WWE to reconsider their business deal with the Saudi kingdom. WWE continued to promote the show, but erased all references to Saudi Arabia as the event's location.

On October 19, the day tickets were to go on sale, the Saudi government confirmed the death of Khashoggi within the consulate and WWE.com removed ticket information from the event page. On October 25, WWE confirmed the event would go on as planned, citing contractual obligations to the General Sports Authority. Speaking with Sky Sports on pushing forward with the event despite the murder, Stephanie McMahon spoke of "an incredibly tough decision, given that heinous act", but said that in the end it was strictly a business decision.

=== Wrestlers refusing to work ===
Sami Zayn did not participate in the Greatest Royal Rumble as Zayn is of Syrian descent, and Saudi Arabia had strained relations with Syria. Noam Dar, an Israeli wrestler, has never participated in any of the Saudi events due to the Arab League boycott of Israel and the Arab–Israeli conflict.

During Crown Jewel (2018), Daniel Bryan was scheduled to face AJ Styles for the WWE Championship, but he refused to work the show due to the Khashoggi murder. As a result, his title match was bumped up to the October 30 episode of SmackDown, and he was replaced by Samoa Joe. John Cena, who was scheduled to participate in the WWE World Cup at the event and had called it "an honor and a privilege" to compete in Saudi Arabia during the Greatest Royal Rumble, was replaced by Bobby Lashley, as he reportedly refused to work the show in wake of the Khashoggi murder. In February 2019, Fightful reported that prior to his leukemia diagnosis, Roman Reigns had informed Vince McMahon that he also would not be taking part in the Crown Jewel PPV due to the controversy surrounding the event.

In 2019 for Super ShowDown, Kevin Owens and Aleister Black told WWE that they would not travel to Saudi Arabia, in addition to Zayn and Bryan once again not competing on the show. Kevin Owen's refusal to work the show allegedly comes from his friendship with Sami Zayn. As a result of his absence, he was replaced in the WWE Championship match by Dolph Ziggler.

Despite Dar not participating in the Saudi Arabia shows due to the Arab–Israeli conflict, Goldberg and Paul Heyman have worked multiple Saudi Arabia shows without incident despite both being Jewish and in Heyman's case his own mother having been a Holocaust survivor. Goldberg would go on to defend WWE on the shows following his victory over Bobby Lashley at the 2021 Crown Jewel, saying that he feels the country is heading in the right direction in "Westernizing" the country and the Middle East region as a whole, citing the progress just in WWE's shows alone in the Kingdom. Goldberg did, however, later admit on The Pat McAfee Show that he was initially scared to go to Saudi Arabia due to his strong Jewish heritage, but felt more comfortable after receiving a positive response from the Saudi fans and understood the bigger picture of the shows.

Since Saudi Arabia has strict laws against apostasy which is punishable by death, Montel Vontavious Porter (Hassan Assad), an atheist who is a former Muslim converted during his prison term, avoided travel to the country for Crown Jewel in 2022.

After Saudi Arabia–Syria relations were re-established in May 2023, Zayn and Owens were scheduled to perform at Night of Champions later that month in Jeddah. This was in turn Zayn's first Saudi event since a WWE Live tour in April 2014 and Owens' first Saudi event since Greatest Royal Rumble in April 2018.

=== Travel issues ===
After Crown Jewel in 2019, a charter flight back to the United States carrying roughly 200 WWE employees (including performers and other staff) was delayed at King Fahd International Airport for multiple hours. WWE and the airline Atlas Air officially stated that the flight had been grounded for mechanical issues, but reports from former WWE Spanish-language commentator Hugo Savinovich and wrestling journalist Dave Meltzer suggested that disputes with the Saudi government over missed payments to WWE for the previous shows were a factor in the delays (including the presence of Saudi military police). 20 WWE employees, including CEO Vince McMahon and 12 wrestlers, booked their own flights back to the United States, while the following night's SmackDown in Buffalo was retooled to primarily feature talent from the women's division and NXT (who did not participate in the event).

=== Lawsuit ===
On March 6, 2020, a retirement fund for firefighters filed a lawsuit against WWE in the United States District Court for the Southern District of New York, stemming from concerns related to the fund's holding of WWE stock. According to Forbes, it is "an attempt at class action alleging that WWE defrauded investors via its handling of their deals with the Saudi royal family, who also control OSN, the network that airs WWE programming in Saudi Arabia." The lawsuit claims that the Saudi Arabian government failed to pay WWE millions of dollars owed from their deal with the company, that WWE's failed to disclose said payment issues and that OSN unlawfully terminated a broadcast deal with WWE.

== Live events ==
=== House shows ===
| SmackDown-branded event |

| # | Date | City | Venue |
|---|---|---|---|
| 1 | April 17–19, 2014 | Riyadh, Riyadh Province, Saudi Arabia | Green Halls Stadium |
| 2 | October 8–10, 2015 | Jeddah, Mecca Province, Saudi Arabia | King Abdullah Sports City Sports Hall |
| 3 | November 3–4, 2016 | Riyadh, Riyadh Province, Saudi Arabia | Green Halls Stadium |

=== Weekly television ===
| # | Event | Date | City | Venue | Main event | Ref. |
|---|---|---|---|---|---|---|
| 1 | SmackDown | May 24, 2024 | Jeddah, Mecca Province, Saudi Arabia | Jeddah Super Dome | Randy Orton vs. Tama Tonga | |
| 2 | Raw | November 3, 2024 (aired November 4, 2024) | Riyadh, Riyadh Province, Saudi Arabia | Mohammed Abdo Arena | Seth "Freakin" Rollins vs. Damian Priest vs. Sheamus vs. "Dirty" Dominik Mysterio to determine the #1 contender for the World Heavyweight Championship | |
| 3 | SmackDown | June 27, 2025 | Riyadh, Riyadh Province, Saudi Arabia | Kingdom Arena | Tiffany Stratton vs. Nia Jax in a Last Woman Standing match for the WWE Women's Championship | |
| 4 | SmackDown | January 30, 2026 | Riyadh, Riyadh Province, Saudi Arabia | Riyadh Season Stadium at King Abdullah Financial District | The Vision (Austin Theory, Bron Breakker, Bronson Reed, and Logan Paul) vs. Cody Rhodes, Jey Uso, Randy Orton, and Sami Zayn | |

=== Pay-per-view and livestreaming events ===
| # | Event | Date | City | Venue | Main event | Ref. |
|---|---|---|---|---|---|---|
| 1 | Greatest Royal Rumble | April 27, 2018 | Jeddah, Saudi Arabia | King Abdullah Stadium | 50-man Greatest Royal Rumble match for the Greatest Royal Rumble Trophy and Championship | |
| 2 | Crown Jewel (2018) | November 2, 2018 | Riyadh, Saudi Arabia | King Saud University Stadium | D-Generation X (Shawn Michaels and Triple H) vs. The Brothers of Destruction (Kane and The Undertaker) | |
| 3 | Super ShowDown (2019) | June 7, 2019 | Jeddah, Saudi Arabia | King Abdullah Stadium | The Undertaker vs. Goldberg | |
| 4 | Crown Jewel (2019) | October 31, 2019 | Riyadh, Saudi Arabia | King Fahd International Stadium | Seth Rollins (c) vs. "The Fiend" Bray Wyatt in a Falls Count Anywhere match for the WWE Universal Championship which could not be stopped for any reason | |
| 5 | Super ShowDown (2020) | February 27, 2020 | Riyadh, Saudi Arabia | Mohammed Abdo Arena | "The Fiend" Bray Wyatt (c) vs. Goldberg for the WWE Universal Championship | |
| 6 | Crown Jewel (2021) | October 21, 2021 | Riyadh, Saudi Arabia | Mohammed Abdo Arena | Roman Reigns (c) vs. Brock Lesnar for the WWE Universal Championship | |
| 7 | Elimination Chamber (2022) | February 19, 2022 | Jeddah, Saudi Arabia | Jeddah Super Dome | Bobby Lashley (c) vs. Brock Lesnar vs. AJ Styles vs. Austin Theory vs. Riddle vs. Seth "Freakin" Rollins in an Elimination Chamber match for the WWE Championship | |
| 8 | Crown Jewel (2022) | November 5, 2022 | Riyadh, Saudi Arabia | Mrsool Park | Roman Reigns (c) vs. Logan Paul for the Undisputed WWE Universal Championship | |
| 9 | Night of Champions (2023) | May 27, 2023 | Jeddah, Saudi Arabia | Jeddah Super Dome | Kevin Owens and Sami Zayn (c) vs. The Bloodline (Roman Reigns and Solo Sikoa) for the Undisputed WWE Tag Team Championship | |
| 10 | Crown Jewel (2023) | November 4, 2023 | Riyadh, Saudi Arabia | Mohammed Abdo Arena | Roman Reigns (c) vs. LA Knight for the Undisputed WWE Universal Championship | |
| 11 | King and Queen of the Ring (2024) | May 25, 2024 | Jeddah, Saudi Arabia | Jeddah Super Dome | Cody Rhodes (c) vs. Logan Paul for the Undisputed WWE Championship | |
| 12 | Crown Jewel (2024) | November 2, 2024 | Riyadh, Saudi Arabia | Mohammed Abdo Arena | Cody Rhodes (Undisputed WWE Champion) vs. Gunther (World Heavyweight Champion) for the Crown Jewel Championship | |
| 13 | Night of Champions (2025) | June 28, 2025 | Riyadh, Saudi Arabia | Kingdom Arena | John Cena (c) vs. CM Punk for the Undisputed WWE Championship | |
| 14 | Royal Rumble (2026) | January 31, 2026 | Riyadh, Saudi Arabia | Riyadh Season Stadium at King Abdullah Financial District | 30-man Royal Rumble match | |
| 15 | Night of Champions (2026) | June 27, 2026 | Riyadh, Saudi Arabia | Kingdom Arena | Cody Rhodes (c) vs. Gunther vs. Sami Zayn for the Undisputed WWE Championship | |
| 16 | Crown Jewel (2026) | November 7, 2026 | Riyadh, Saudi Arabia | ANB Arena | Sami Zayn (Undisputed WWE Champion) vs. Roman Reigns (World Heavyweight Champion) for the Crown Jewel Championship | |
| 17 | WrestleMania 43 | 2027 | Riyadh, Saudi Arabia | TBA | TBA | |

== Accomplishments ==
These are accomplishments that have occurred as special attractions at Saudi Arabian events, not including regular championship matches.

The colors indicate the home brand of the winners.

| Raw | SmackDown | NXT | Unbranded |

Open
| Accomplishment | Winner | Date | Event | Location | Notes | Ref |
| King of the Ring tournament | Oba Femi | June 27, 2026 | Night of Champions | Riyadh, Saudi Arabia | Defeated Raw's Jey Uso in the tournament final to become the 25th King of the Ring, but forfeited his title shot to challenge Brock Lesnar in a Hell in a Cell match at SummerSlam. | |
| Queen of the Ring tournament | Iyo Sky | June 27, 2026 | Night of Champions | Riyadh, Saudi Arabia | Defeated Raw's Liv Morgan in the tournament final to become the fourth Queen of the Ring and earn a re-match for Raw's Women's World Championship at SummerSlam. | |
| Men's Royal Rumble match | Roman Reigns | January 31, 2026 | Royal Rumble | Riyadh, Saudi Arabia | Last eliminated Raw's Gunther to earn a world championship match at WrestleMania 42. | |
| Women's Royal Rumble match | Liv Morgan | January 31, 2026 | Royal Rumble | Riyadh, Saudi Arabia | Last eliminated SmackDown's Tiffany Stratton to earn a world championship match at WrestleMania 42. | |

=== Former accomplishments ===
Open
| Accomplishment | Winner | Date | Event | Location | Notes | Ref |
| Greatest Royal Rumble | Braun Strowman | April 27, 2018 | Greatest Royal Rumble | Jeddah, Saudi Arabia | Last eliminated SmackDown's Big Cass in the 50-man Greatest Royal Rumble match to win the Greatest Royal Rumble trophy and championship. | |
| WWE World Cup | Shane McMahon | November 2, 2018 | Crown Jewel | Riyadh, Saudi Arabia | Defeated Raw's Dolph Ziggler in the tournament final to win the WWE World Cup trophy. | |
| 51-man Battle Royal | Mansoor | June 7, 2019 | Super ShowDown | Jeddah, Saudi Arabia | Last eliminated SmackDown's Elias to win WWE's largest standard Battle Royal. | |
| WWE Tag Team World Cup | The O.C. (Luke Gallows and Karl Anderson) | October 31, 2019 | Crown Jewel | Riyadh, Saudi Arabia | Last eliminated Raw's The Viking Raiders (Erik and Ivar) in an interbrand nine-team tag team turmoil match to win the WWE Tag Team World Cup trophy. | |
| Tuwaiq Mountain Trophy Gauntlet Match | The Undertaker | February 27, 2020 | Super ShowDown | Riyadh, Saudi Arabia | Last eliminated Raw's AJ Styles in a six-man gauntlet match to win the Tuwaiq Mountain Trophy. | |
| King of the Ring tournament | Xavier Woods | October 21, 2021 | Crown Jewel | Riyadh, Saudi Arabia | Defeated SmackDown's Finn Bálor in the tournament final to become the 22nd King of the Ring. | |
| Queen's Crown tournament | Zelina Vega | October 21, 2021 | Crown Jewel | Riyadh, Saudi Arabia | Defeated Raw's Doudrop in the tournament final to become the inaugural Queen's Crown tournament winner. In 2024, the tournament name was changed to Queen of the Ring. | |
| King of the Ring tournament | Gunther | May 25, 2024 | King and Queen of the Ring | Jeddah, Saudi Arabia | Defeated SmackDown's Randy Orton in the tournament final to become the 23rd King of the Ring and earn a match for Raw's World Heavyweight Championship at SummerSlam. | |
| Queen of the Ring tournament | Nia Jax | May 25, 2024 | King and Queen of the Ring | Jeddah, Saudi Arabia | Defeated Raw's Lyra Valkyria in the tournament final to become the second Queen of the Ring and earn a match for SmackDown's WWE Women's Championship at SummerSlam. | |
| King of the Ring tournament | Cody Rhodes | June 28, 2025 | Night of Champions | Riyadh, Saudi Arabia | Defeated SmackDown's Randy Orton in the tournament final to become the 24th King of the Ring and earn a match for SmackDown's Undisputed WWE Championship at SummerSlam. | |
| Queen of the Ring tournament | Jade Cargill | June 28, 2025 | Night of Champions | Riyadh, Saudi Arabia | Defeated Raw's Asuka in the tournament final to become the third Queen of the Ring and earn a match for SmackDown's WWE Women's Championship at SummerSlam. | |

== See also ==
- Sportswashing
