= WWE Crown Jewel =

WWE premium live event series

- WWE Crown Jewel logo with a green crown. A blue variant was used when the event was held in Australia in 2025.
- Promotions: WWE
- Brands: Raw (2018–2019, 2021–present); SmackDown (2018–2019, 2021–present)
- First event: 2018
- Signature matches: Men's and Women's Crown Jewel Championship matches (2024–present)

WWE Crown Jewel is a professional wrestling premium live event (PLE) produced by WWE, an American-based promotion. It is broadcast live and available only through pay-per-view (PPV) and WWE's livestreaming platforms. Established in 2018, the event has been held every year since except in 2020, which was due to the COVID-19 pandemic that year, and it is typically held in late October—early November. Since 2024, the event has been centered around the men's and women's Crown Jewel Championship matches, held between the respective reigning men's and women's world champions of WWE's Raw and SmackDown brand divisions to determine who is the better champion.

Crown Jewel is WWE's main recurring PLE that takes place in Saudi Arabia as part of a 10-year partnership in support of Saudi Vision 2030; the inaugural Crown Jewel was the second event in this partnership. With the exception of the 2025 event, the name is a reference it taking place in Riyadh, the capital of Saudi Arabia, and it is typically held as part of the annual Riyadh Season festivities, which began in 2019. Due to the 2026 Royal Rumble taking place as part of the 2025–2026 Riyadh Season, the 2025 Crown Jewel instead took place in Perth, the capital of Western Australia, Australia, but Crown Jewel returned to Riyadh in 2026 as part of the 2026–2027 Riyadh Season.

== History ==
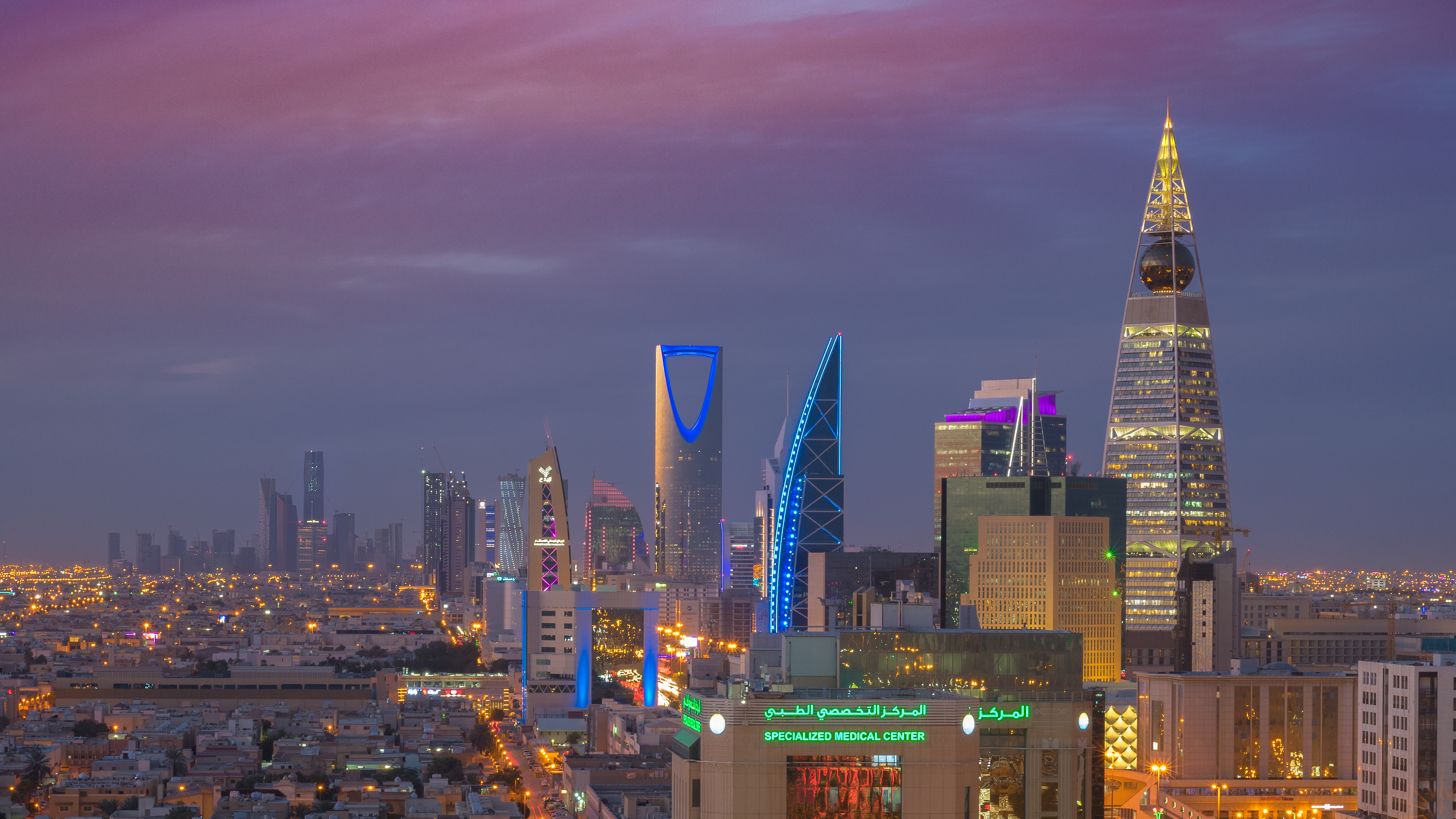
With the exception of 2020 and 2025, Crown Jewel is held at venues in Riyadh, Saudi Arabia as part of the annual Riyadh Season festivities, which began in 2019. An event was not held in 2020 due to the COVID-19 pandemic while the 2025 event was held in Australia due to the 2026 Royal Rumble being held in Riyadh as part of the 2025–2026 Riyadh Season.

In early 2018, the American professional wrestling promotion WWE began a 10-year strategic multiplatform partnership with the Ministry of Sport (formerly the General Sports Authority; renamed in 2020) in support of Saudi Vision 2030, Saudi Arabia's social and economic reform program. The first pay-per-view (PPV) and WWE Network event under this partnership, the Greatest Royal Rumble, was held at the King Abdullah International Stadium in Jeddah on April 27, 2018. A follow-up was held on November 2 titled Crown Jewel, which was held at the King Saud University Stadium in Riyadh, the capital of Saudi Arabia; the show was headlined by the first (and so far only) "WWE World Cup" tournament, and a tag team match between D-Generation X (Shawn Michaels and Triple H) and The Brothers of Destruction (Kane and The Undertaker).

A second Crown Jewel event was then held the following year on October 31, 2019, at Riyadh's King Fahd International Stadium, thus establishing Crown Jewel as a recurring event for the Saudi Arabian partnership and held in Riyadh. Simultaneously, Riyadh launched the annual Riyadh Season festival earlier that same month, with Crown Jewel becoming a part of the festivities. Because of COVID-19 pandemic-related regulations, a Crown Jewel was not held in 2020; however, the event returned in 2021 and took place on October 21 at the Mohammed Abdo Arena on the Boulevard in Riyadh. The 2021 event was also the first Crown Jewel to livestream on Peacock in the United States, following the merger of the American version of the WWE Network under Peacock in April that year.

On May 23, 2022, WWE announced that the 2022 Crown Jewel would be held on Saturday, November 5. The event was held at Mrsool Park, marking the second Crown Jewel to be held at this venue after the inaugural 2018 event, which was held there when it was previously referred to as King Saud University Stadium (renamed in 2020). This 2022 event was also the first Crown Jewel to be branded as a "premium live event" (PLE), a term the company introduced on January 1, 2022, to refer to its events airing on PPV and via WWE's livestreaming platforms. The 2023 event was confirmed to be held at the Mohammed Abdo Arena, marking the second Crown Jewel held at this venue after the 2021 event.

The 2024 event introduced the Crown Jewel Championships for both the men and women. This was announced to be an annual match for Crown Jewel, contested between the reigning men's and women's world champions of Raw and SmackDown to determine who is the better champion. The inaugural winners were SmackDown's Undisputed WWE Champion Cody Rhodes and Raw's Women's World Champion Liv Morgan.

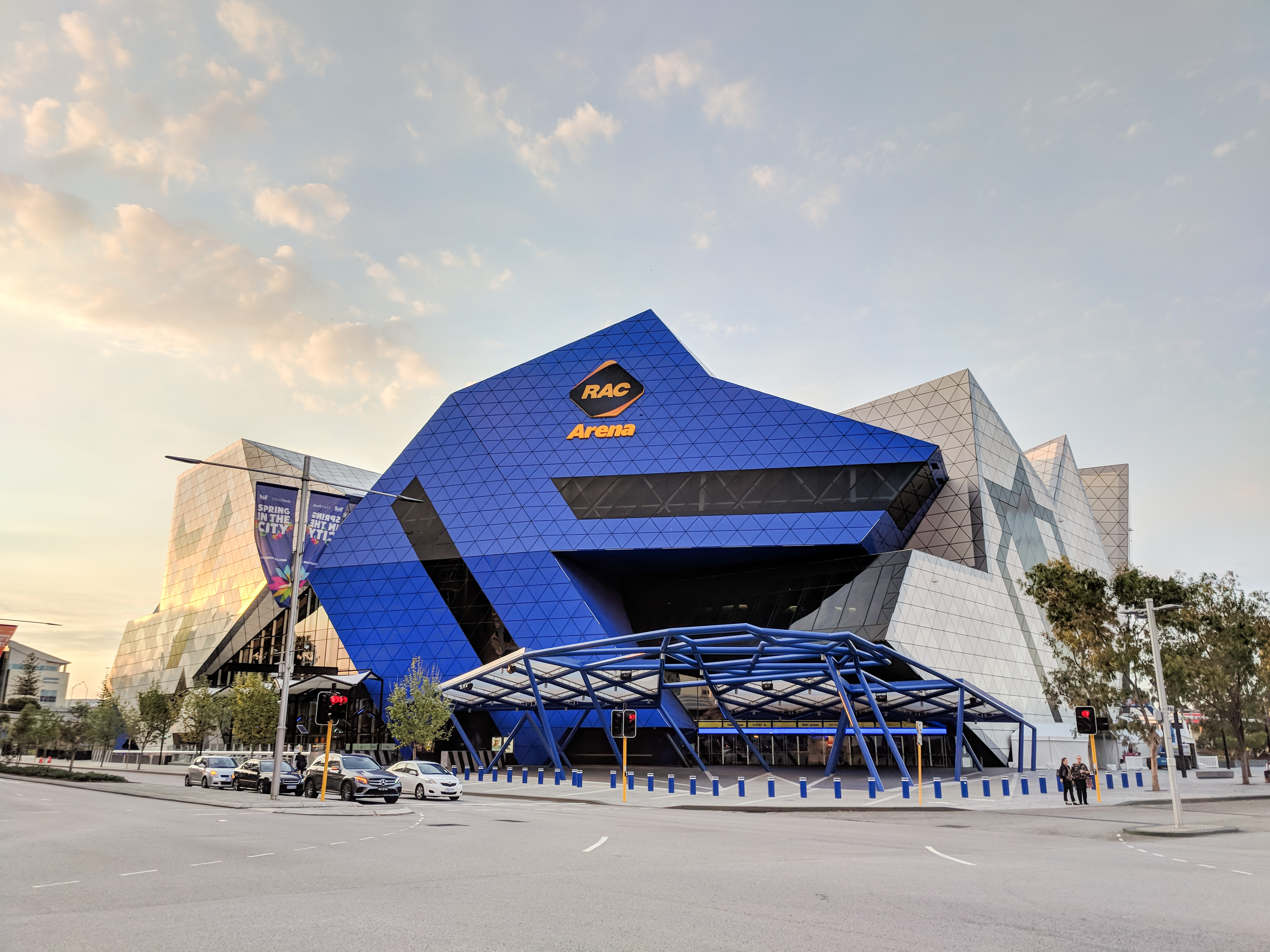
Due to the 2026 Royal Rumble being held in Riyadh for the 2025–2026 Riyadh Season, the 2025 Crown Jewel was held at the RAC Arena in Perth, Western Australia, Australia, marking the first and only Crown Jewel held outside of Riyadh.

Due to the 2026 Royal Rumble taking place in Riyadh as part of the 2025–2026 Riyadh Season, WWE would hold only one PLE in Saudi Arabia for 2025 with 2026 having three PLEs. As such, a Crown Jewel was not scheduled for Riyadh in 2025, and instead, the 2025 Crown Jewel was scheduled for Perth, Western Australia at the RAC Arena on October 11, 2025, promoted as Crown Jewel: Perth, marking the first and only Crown Jewel to not be held in Riyadh. This came after WWE had announced that it would be returning to Australia sometime in 2025 due to the large success of the 2024 Elimination Chamber, which was also held in Perth. This was also the first Crown Jewel to livestream on Netflix in most international markets after the WWE Network in those areas merged under the platform in January 2025, as well as the first to livestream on the ESPN app in the United States, as WWE's contract with Peacock to air main roster PLEs expired at the conclusion of Clash in Paris in August 2025.

Crown Jewel returned to Riyadh in 2026 as part of the 2026–2027 Riyadh Season. The 2026 event was originally planned to be held at the Riyadh Season Stadium, a purpose-built temporary stadium in the King Abdullah Financial District which had been used for the 2026 Royal Rumble, but reportedly due to low ticket sales, it was moved to the much smaller ANB Arena. The event was also held amid conflict in the area, occurring right after the October 2026 attacks on Saudi airports, with reports suggesting the venue change was also due to security concerns.

== Events ==
#	Event	Date	City	Venue	Main event	Ref
1	Crown Jewel (2018)	November 2, 2018	Riyadh, Saudi Arabia	King Saud University Stadium	D-Generation X (Shawn Michaels and Triple H) vs. Brothers of Destruction (Kane and The Undertaker)	
2	Crown Jewel (2019)	October 31, 2019	Riyadh, Saudi Arabia	King Fahd International Stadium	Seth Rollins (c) vs. "The Fiend" Bray Wyatt in a Falls Count Anywhere match that could not be stopped for any reason for the WWE Universal Championship	
3	Crown Jewel (2021)	October 21, 2021	Riyadh, Saudi Arabia	Mohammed Abdo Arena	Roman Reigns (c) vs. Brock Lesnar for the WWE Universal Championship	
4	Crown Jewel (2022)	November 5, 2022	Riyadh, Saudi Arabia	Mrsool Park	Roman Reigns (c) vs. Logan Paul for the Undisputed WWE Universal Championship	
5	Crown Jewel (2023)	November 4, 2023	Riyadh, Saudi Arabia	Mohammed Abdo Arena	Roman Reigns (c) vs. LA Knight for the Undisputed WWE Universal Championship	
6	Crown Jewel (2024)	November 2, 2024	Riyadh, Saudi Arabia	Mohammed Abdo Arena	Gunther (World Heavyweight Champion) vs. Cody Rhodes (Undisputed WWE Champion) for the inaugural 2024 WWE Crown Jewel Championship	
7	Crown Jewel (2025)	October 11, 2025	Perth, Western Australia, Australia	RAC Arena	Seth Rollins (World Heavyweight Champion) vs. Cody Rhodes (Undisputed WWE Champion) for the 2025 WWE Crown Jewel Championship	
8	Crown Jewel (2026)	November 7, 2026	Riyadh, Saudi Arabia	ANB Arena	Roman Reigns (World Heavyweight Champion) vs. Sami Zayn (Undisputed WWE Champion) for the 2026 WWE Crown Jewel Championship	
(c) – refers to the champion(s) heading into the match

== Championships and other accomplishments ==
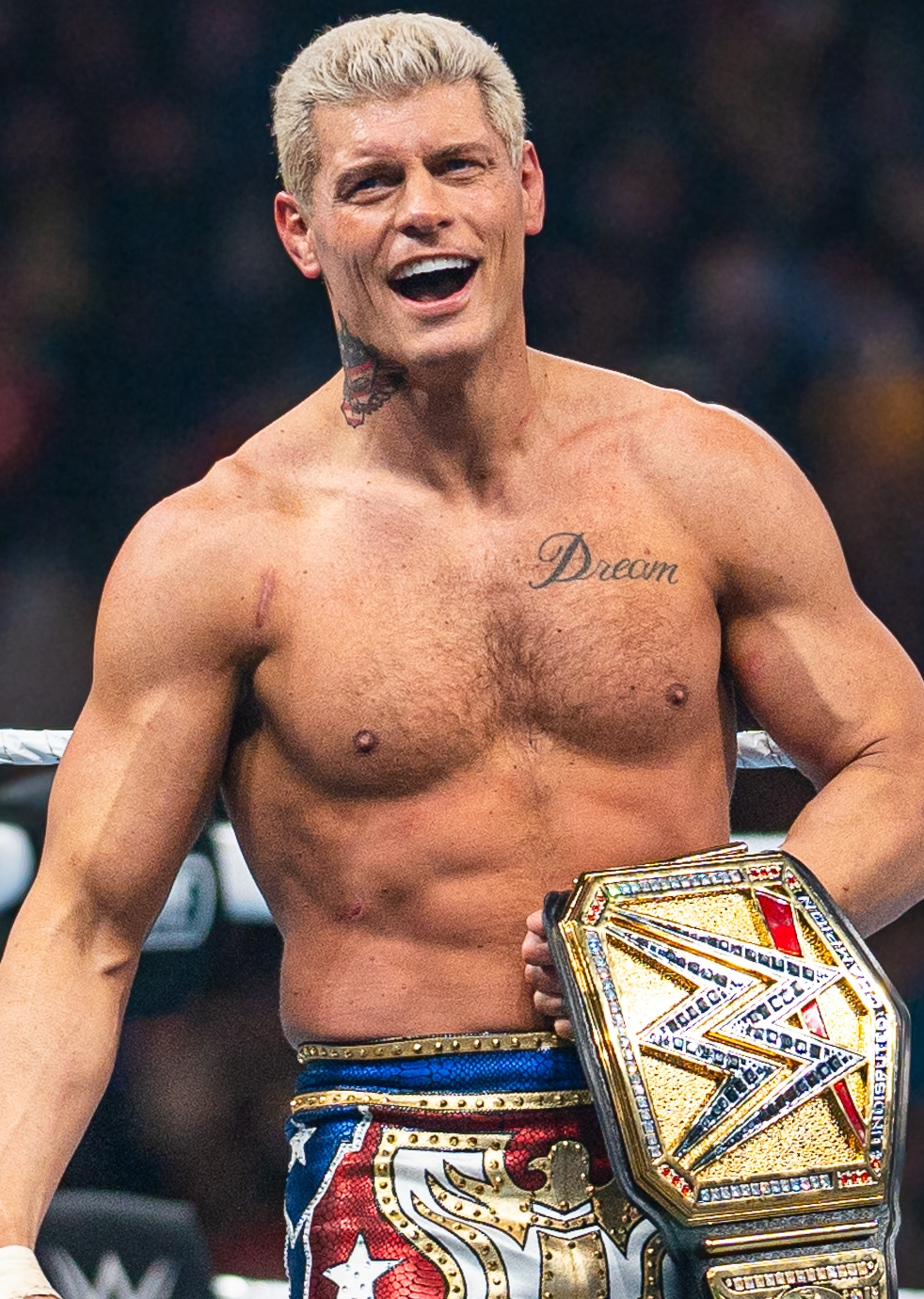
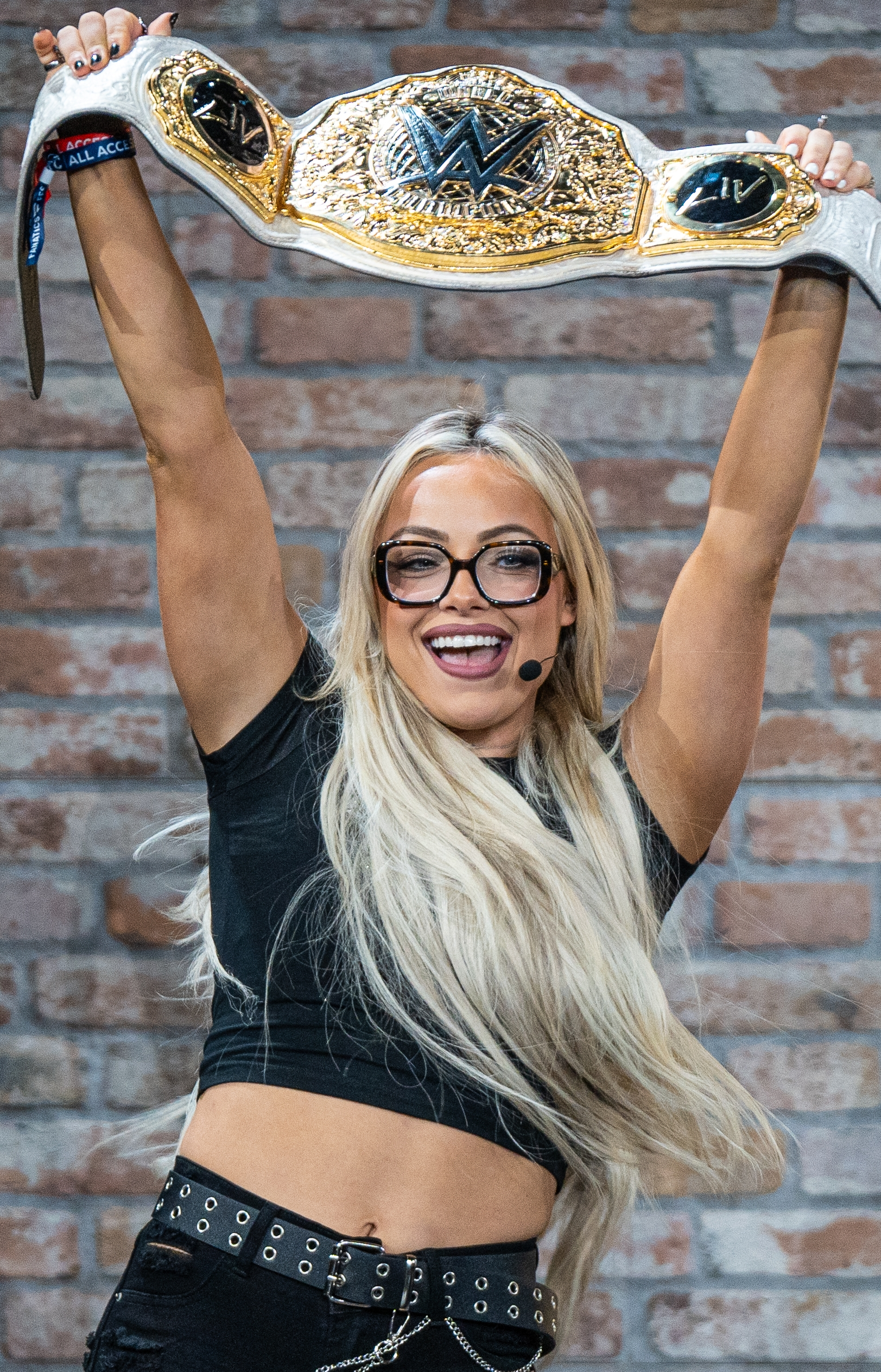
Cody Rhodes and Liv Morgan, shown with their respective brand's world championships—SmackDown's Undisputed WWE Championship and Raw's Women's World Championship—were the inaugural 2024 men's and women's Crown Jewel Championship winners.

These are accomplishments that have occurred as special attractions at Crown Jewel events, not including regular championship matches.

The colors and symbols indicate the home brand of the winners and runner-ups.

†	Raw	‡	SmackDown

=== Crown Jewel Championships ===
Established in 2024, the WWE Crown Jewel Championships are the prize of an annual match between the reigning men's and women's world champions of WWE's Raw and SmackDown brands. The respective Raw and SmackDown world titles, however, are not defended and instead, the winners are crowned the men's and women's Crown Jewel Champions to determine who is the better champion. While the championships are represented by championship belts, the respective winners are instead given a Crown Jewel ring (similar to a Super Bowl ring) as the belts remain on display at the WWE Experience attraction in Riyadh—the winners get to celebrate with the belts and do media with them following the event before the belts are returned to Riyadh. The inaugural winners were SmackDown's Undisputed WWE Champion Cody Rhodes and Raw's Women's World Champion Liv Morgan. The 2026 winners were Raw's World Heavyweight Champion Roman Reigns and SmackDown's WWE Women's Champion Chelsea Green.

==== Men ====
#	Year	Winner	Runner-up	Date	Location	Ref.
1	2024	Undisputed WWE Champion; Cody Rhodes	World Heavyweight Champion; Gunther	November 2, 2024	Riyadh, Saudi Arabia	
2	2025	World Heavyweight Champion; Seth Rollins	Undisputed WWE Champion; Cody Rhodes	October 11, 2025	Perth, Western Australia, Australia	
3	2026	World Heavyweight Champion; Roman Reigns	Undisputed WWE Champion; Sami Zayn	November 7, 2026	Riyadh, Saudi Arabia	

==== Women ====
#	Year	Winner	Runner-up	Date	Location	Ref.
1	2024	Women's World Champion; Liv Morgan	WWE Women's Champion; Nia Jax	November 2, 2024	Riyadh, Saudi Arabia	
2	2025	Women's World Champion; Stephanie Vaquer	WWE Women's Champion; Tiffany Stratton	October 11, 2025	Perth, Western Australia, Australia	
3	2026	WWE Women's Champion; Chelsea Green	Women's World Champion; Liv Morgan	November 7, 2026	Riyadh, Saudi Arabia	

=== Other accomplishments ===
Year	Accomplishment	Winner	Notes	Ref
2018	WWE World Cup	Shane McMahon	Defeated Raw's Dolph Ziggler in the tournament final to win the WWE World Cup trophy.	
2019	WWE Tag Team World Cup	The O.C. (Luke Gallows and Karl Anderson)	Last eliminated Raw's The Viking Raiders (Erik and Ivar) in an interbrand nine-team tag team turmoil match to win the WWE Tag Team World Cup trophy.	
2021	King of the Ring tournament	Xavier Woods	Defeated SmackDown's Finn Bálor to become the 22nd King of the Ring tournament winner.	
2021	Queen's Crown tournament	Zelina Vega	Defeated Raw's Doudrop in the tournament final to become the inaugural Queen's Crown tournament winner.	

== See also ==
- WWE in Saudi Arabia
