= Crown Jewel (2019) =

WWE pay-per-view and livestreaming event

Crown Jewel جوهرة التاج (Arabic)
- Promotional poster featuring Braun Strowman, Tyson Fury, Brock Lesnar, and Cain Velasquez
- Promotion: WWE
- Brand(s): Raw; SmackDown
- Date: October 31, 2019
- City: Riyadh, Saudi Arabia
- Venue: King Fahd International Stadium

WWE event chronology
← Previous; Hell in a Cell	Next → NXT TakeOver: WarGames

WWE in Saudi Arabia chronology
← Previous; Super ShowDown (2019)	Next → Super ShowDown (2020)

Crown Jewel chronology
← Previous; 2018	Next → 2021

The 2019 Crown Jewel (Arabic: جوهرة التاج, romanized: jawharat altaaji) was a professional wrestling pay-per-view (PPV) and livestreaming event produced by the American company WWE, held for wrestlers from the promotion's main roster brands, Raw and SmackDown. It was the second annual Crown Jewel and took place on Thursday, October 31, 2019, at King Fahd International Stadium in Riyadh, Saudi Arabia as part of the city's inaugural Riyadh Season festivities, which launched earlier that same month. It aired live at 8:00 p.m. Arabia Standard Time (1:00 p.m. Eastern Time) and was the fourth event that WWE held in Saudi Arabia under a 10-year partnership in support of Saudi Vision 2030. A Crown Jewel event was not held in 2020 due to the COVID-19 pandemic, but it returned in 2021.

Nine matches were contested at the event, including one on the Kickoff pre-show. In the main event, SmackDown's "The Fiend" Bray Wyatt defeated Raw's Seth Rollins in a Falls Count Anywhere match that could not be stopped for any reason to win the Universal Championship, which subsequently transferred the title to SmackDown. In other prominent matches, Brock Lesnar defeated Cain Velasquez by submission to retain SmackDown's WWE Championship, which was the opening bout, professional boxer Tyson Fury defeated Braun Strowman by countout, and Natalya defeated Lacey Evans by submission in what was the first professional wrestling women's match to take place in Saudi Arabia.

The event was met with mixed to positive reception from critics; although the tag team turmoil match, Raw's United States Championship match, the 5-on-5 tag team match, and in particular the singles match between Mansoor and Cesaro were largely praised, Lesnar vs. Velasquez and Fury vs. Strowman were near-universally panned, with the Universal Championship match receiving a polarized reception. The women's match received polarized reactions for its booking and significance, while being considered average in quality.

== Production ==
=== Background ===
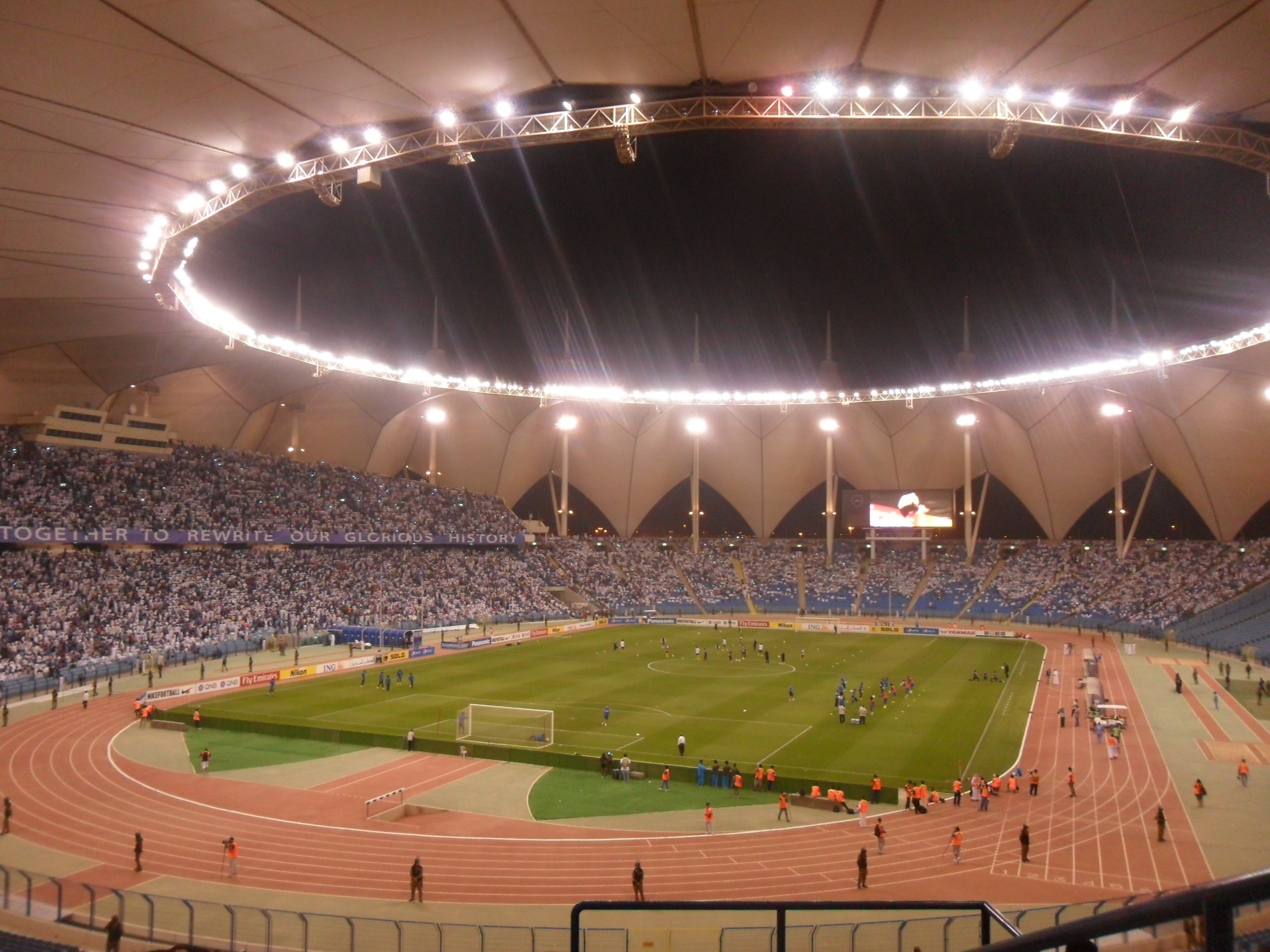
The second annual Crown Jewel was held at the King Fahd International Stadium in Riyadh, Saudi Arabia.

In early 2018, the American professional wrestling promotion WWE began a 10-year strategic multiplatform partnership with the Ministry of Sport (formerly General Sports Authority) in support of Saudi Vision 2030, Saudi Arabia's social and economic reform program. Crown Jewel was established later that year as one of the recurring events in this partnership to be held in Riyadh, the capital of Saudi Arabia.

As first reported on August 5, 2019, and later confirmed on September 27, WWE's Arabic website announced that a second Crown Jewel event would be held at King Fahd International Stadium in Riyadh on Thursday, October 31, and feature wrestlers from the Raw and SmackDown brand divisions. The event was held as part of the city's inaugural Riyadh Season festivities, which launched earlier that same month. The 2019 Crown Jewel was the fourth event under the Saudi Arabian partnership and established Crown Jewel as a recurring Saudi Arabian event in Riyadh. In addition to the main card airing at 8:00 p.m. Arabia Standard Time (1:00 p.m. Eastern Time) on traditional pay-per-view (PPV) worldwide, the event was available to livestream on the WWE Network. WWE Hall of Famer Hulk Hogan and The Undertaker were announced to be making appearances at the event; however, it was later revealed that The Undertaker would not be appearing, but was seen representing WWE in the Riyadh Season Grand Parade Opening.

=== Storylines ===
The event comprised nine matches, including one on the Kickoff pre-show, that resulted from scripted storylines. Results were predetermined by WWE's writers on the Raw and SmackDown brands, while storylines were produced on WWE's weekly television shows, Monday Night Raw and Friday Night SmackDown.

On the September 30 episode of Raw, Hulk Hogan and fellow WWE Hall of Famer Ric Flair were guests on "Miz TV" where Hogan and Flair teased a match against each other. The Miz then announced that at Crown Jewel, there would be a 5-on-5 tag team match between Team Hogan and Team Flair, with Hogan and Flair as the respective coaches. Universal Champion Seth Rollins and Randy Orton were selected as the captains of Team Hogan and Team Flair, respectively. Later that night, Rusev joined Team Hogan while King Corbin joined Team Flair. On the October 14 episode of Raw, Ricochet was added to Team Hogan, while Bobby Lashley and Intercontinental Champion Shinsuke Nakamura were added to Team Flair. That same episode, Rollins was scheduled to defend the Universal Championship at the event and was subsequently removed from the tag team match. On the following SmackDown, Hogan revealed that Ali and Shorty G (shortened from Shorty Gable) were added to his team. Later, Roman Reigns was announced as Rollins' replacement as Team Hogan's captain. Drew McIntyre was revealed as the final member of Team Flair on the following Raw.

On the September 30 episode of Raw, Brock Lesnar and his advocate Paul Heyman interrupted an in-ring promo by Rey Mysterio. Lesnar proceeded to brutally attack Mysterio as well as Mysterio's son, Dominik, who was seated in the front row. After Lesnar won the WWE Championship during SmackDown's 20th Anniversary that Friday, Mysterio appeared along with former Ultimate Fighting Championship (UFC) mixed martial artist Cain Velasquez, making his WWE debut. Velasquez, who had defeated Lesnar for the UFC Heavyweight Championship by technical knockout at UFC 121 in October 2010, entered the ring and attacked Lesnar, who managed to escape and retreated. In a backstage interview, Velasquez stated he came to exact revenge from Lesnar for what he did to Mysterio and Dominik, who was later revealed to be Velasquez's godson. At the Crown Jewel press conference in Las Vegas on October 11, it was announced that Lesnar would defend the WWE Championship against Velasquez at Crown Jewel.

Amid Braun Strowman's match during SmackDown's 20th Anniversary on October 4, Strowman taunted professional boxer Tyson Fury, who was seated in the front row. Later during that match, Strowman brutally slung Dolph Ziggler into the barricade, which knocked Fury back into his seat. Following the match, Fury jumped the barricade only to be restrained by security. On the following Raw, Fury appeared, wanting an apology from Strowman. After exchanging verbal insults, a massive brawl broke out between the two that had to be separated by security and other wrestlers. At the Crown Jewel press conference in Las Vegas on October 11, it was announced that Strowman would face Fury at Crown Jewel.

At Hell in a Cell, the Universal Championship Hell in a Cell match between defending champion Seth Rollins and "The Fiend" Bray Wyatt ended by match stoppage, thus Rollins retained. The Fiend, thought to be injured, proceeded to further attack Rollins after the match. On the October 11 episode of SmackDown (the first night of the 2019 WWE Draft), a match between Rollins (representing Raw) and Roman Reigns (representing SmackDown) was scheduled to determine which brand would earn the first draft pick of the night. Rollins won by disqualification due to The Fiend's interference, earning Raw the first draft pick; The Fiend was later drafted to SmackDown. Although Rollins was drafted to Raw on the second night of the draft, a championship rematch between Rollins and The Fiend was scheduled for Crown Jewel as a Falls Count Anywhere match. That same night, Wyatt as his normal self hosted a segment of Firefly Fun House, only for Rollins to interrupt Wyatt inside the Fun House. Rollins attacked Wyatt, and set the Fun House ablaze. On the following SmackDown, a further stipulation was added in that the referee could not stop the match for any reason.

At Super ShowDown, NXT's Mansoor, a Saudi native, won WWE's largest standard battle royal. On October 14, a match between Mansoor and Cesaro was announced for Crown Jewel.

On October 14, the largest tag team turmoil match in WWE history was scheduled for Crown Jewel, with the winners receiving the WWE Tag Team World Cup and being called "the best tag team in the world". Nine teams were announced for the match: The New Day (represented by Big E and Kofi Kingston; Xavier Woods was injured prior to the event), Heavy Machinery (Otis and Tucker), Lucha House Party (Lince Dorado, Gran Metalik, and/or Kalisto), Curt Hawkins and Zack Ryder, The O.C. (represented by Luke Gallows and Karl Anderson; AJ Styles was scheduled for another match), Dolph Ziggler and Robert Roode, The B-Team (Curtis Axel and Bo Dallas), SmackDown Tag Team Champions The Revival (Scott Dawson and Dash Wilder), and Raw Tag Team Champions The Viking Raiders (Erik and Ivar).

On the October 23 episode of The Bump, a 20-man battle royal was scheduled for the Crown Jewel Kickoff pre-show, with the winner receiving a title match against United States Champion AJ Styles later that night.

Due to the limited rights women have in Saudi Arabia, all WWE female wrestlers had been banned from wrestling in WWE events in the country. However, during the Crown Jewel media press conference on October 30, it was announced that a match between Natalya and Lacey Evans had been approved for Crown Jewel, marking the first-ever women's match in Saudi Arabia. In respecting the country's culture, WWE Chief Brand Officer Stephanie McMahon said that both would be wearing full body suits instead of their normal ring attire, although Natalya's normal ring attire is mostly a bodysuit. Both women also wore shirts from the souvenir shops normally sold at the venue and from the WWE store featuring their branding.

== Event ==
Other on-screen personnel
Role:	Name:
English commentators	Michael Cole
English commentators	Corey Graves
Arabic commentators	Faisal Almughaisib
Arabic commentators	Jude Aldajani
Ring announcer	Greg Hamilton
Referees	Shawn Bennett
Referees	John Cone
Referees	Darrick Moore
Referees	Eddie Orengo
Referees	Chad Patton
Interviewer	Byron Saxton
Pre-show panel	Charly Caruso
Pre-show panel	Scott Stanford
Pre-show panel	Booker T
Pre-show panel	David Otunga

=== Pre-show ===
During the Crown Jewel Kickoff pre-show, the 20-man over the top rope battle royal was contested to determine AJ Styles' challenger for the United States Championship. Midway through the match, after both R-Truth and Sunil Singh had been eliminated, Truth pinned Sunil with a roll up on the entrance ramp to win the 24/7 Championship. At the end of the battle royal, Humberto Carrillo eliminated Erick Rowan to win the match and earn a United States Championship match later in the night. This match would also serve as Luke Harper's last match in WWE before his release on December 8 and untimely death the following year.

=== Preliminary matches ===
The actual pay-per-view opened with Brock Lesnar (accompanied by Paul Heyman) defending the WWE Championship against Cain Velasquez (accompanied by Rey Mysterio). After the two traded strikes, Velasquez went for the ground and pound, but Lesnar forced Velasquez to submit to the Kimura Lock to retain the title. After the match, Lesnar kept the hold applied until Mysterio struck Lesnar with a chair. Lesnar threw Mysterio out of the ring and struck Velasquez with the chair. Lesnar performed an F-5 on Velasquez onto the chair. Mysterio struck Lesnar with a chair, forcing Lesnar to retreat.

Next was the tag team turmoil match for the Best in the World WWE Tag Team World Cup. The teams of Dolph Ziggler and Robert Roode and Lucha House Party (Lince Dorado and Gran Metalik, accompanied by Kalisto) started the match. Roode performed a Glorious DDT on Dorado to eliminate Lucha House Party. The next team to enter was Curt Hawkins and Zack Ryder, who were eliminated quickly by Ziggler and Roode following a Spinebuster/Zig-Zag combination on Ryder. Next was Heavy Machinery (Otis and Tucker). Otis and Tucker performed a Compactor on Ziggler to eliminate him and Roode. The New Day (Big E and Kofi Kingston) then entered and eliminated Heavy Machinery after the Midnight Hour on Tucker. The sixth team was Curtis Axel and Bo Dallas, who were eliminated after Big E performed a Big Ending on Axel. The seventh team to enter were SmackDown Tag Team Champions The Revival (Scott Dawson and Dash Wilder), who attacked The New Day after being eliminated by them. The penultimate team to enter was The O.C. (Luke Gallows and Karl Anderson), who eliminated The New Day after performing the Magic Killer on Kingston. The final team to enter were Raw Tag Team Champions The Viking Raiders (Erik and Ivar). Gallows and Anderson performed Magic Killer on Erik to win the match and the Tag Team World Cup trophy.

After that, Mansoor faced Cesaro. After a back and forth match, Mansoor performed a Moonsault on Cesaro to win. Following the match, Mansoor delivered an emotional heartfelt speech to his home country.

In the fourth match, Braun Strowman faced Tyson Fury. In the closing moments, as Strowman returned to the ring, Fury attacked Strowman, who was on the turnbuckle, with a knockout punch. Strowman was counted out, meaning Fury won the match. Afterwards, an irate Strowman performed a Running Powerslam on Fury.

In a backstage segment, Samir Singh pinned R-Truth to win the 24/7 Championship after Truth ran into a door.

Next, AJ Styles (accompanied by his O.C. stablemates Karl Anderson and Luke Gallows) defended the United States Championship against battle royal winner Humberto Carrillo. In the end, Carrillo attempted a Moonsault, but Styles moved out of the way and performed a Phenomenal Forearm on Carrillo to retain the title.

After that, Natalya faced Lacey Evans in the first-ever women's match in Saudi Arabia. Natalya forced Evans to submit to the Sharpshooter to win the match. Following the match, Natalya and Evans shared an emotional embrace in the ring, and then embraced several audience members before departing backstage. Byron Saxton then joined commentators Michael Cole and Corey Graves for the remainder of the event.

The penultimate match was the 5-on-5 tag team match between Team Hogan (Roman Reigns, Rusev, Ricochet, Ali, and Shorty G; accompanied by Hulk Hogan and Jimmy Hart) and Team Flair (Randy Orton, Bobby Lashley, King Corbin, Intercontinental Champion Shinsuke Nakamura, and Drew McIntyre; accompanied by Ric Flair). In the climax, Orton performed an RKO on Reigns for a nearfall. Orton attempted a Punt Kick on Reigns, but Shorty G grabbed Orton's leg, after which, Ali and Ricochet took everyone else out. Reigns then performed a Spear on Orton to win the match for Team Hogan.

=== Main event ===
In the main event, Seth Rollins defended the Universal Championship against "The Fiend" Bray Wyatt in a Falls Count Anywhere match that could not be stopped for any reason. Before the match, Michael Cole explained that if The Fiend won, the title would be taken with him to the SmackDown brand. During the match, as The Fiend attempted a Running Senton through an announce table, Rollins avoided The Fiend, causing The Fiend to break an announce table. The Fiend pushed Rollins, who fell through tables that were stacked on the floor. On a platform, The Fiend performed Sister Abigail on Rollins for a two count. On the entrance ramp, Rollins executed several Curb Stomps on The Fiend. Rollins performed a superkick on The Fiend, who fell onto electrical equipment; this caused the equipment to briefly catch fire. A spark incapacitated Rollins and The Fiend then appeared behind Rollins. The Fiend applied the Mandible Claw on Rollins before performing Sister Abigail on Rollins to win the title. Following the match, The Fiend posed with the title on the entrance ramp.

== Reception ==
The event received mixed to positive reviews. While the event as a whole was praised as a step-up from their previous shows in Saudi Arabia, Lesnar vs. Velasquez and Fury vs. Strowman were generally panned. The Universal Championship match polarized reviewers, while approving of the decision to have Wyatt win, they also unanimously lamented that the title change didn't take place at Hell in a Cell earlier the same month. The Daily Express noted that fan reaction to Fury vs. Strowman was notably negative.

Adam Silverstein and Jack Crosby of CBS Sports gave a mixed review, giving particular praise to Mansoor vs. Cesaro and stating "While it is obvious WWE is pushing and putting over Mansoor due to the Saudi Arabia relationship, you cannot take away his effort. Mansoor looked like a real-deal future superstar for WWE, and Cesaro did a tremendous job calling the entire match and putting the youngster over". They gave a C rating to both Lesnar vs. Velasquez and Fury vs. Strowman, stating that the first was "failing to let Velasquez get somewhat over was confusing" and that Fury vs. Strowman "was never going to be a good match, but Fury did well enough".

Elton Jones of Heavy.com called the event "A mixed bag. On one hand, you had quality bouts such as Mansoor vs. Cesaro, Team Hogan vs. Team Flair, the tag team gauntlet contest and AJ Styles vs. Humberto Carrillo. But then you have to consider the other half of this show, which was filled with terrible matches that garnered the most hype going into them". John Powell of Canoe.com gave a positive review of the event, rating it 8 out of 10. Most praise went to the tag team turmoil match, Mansoor vs. Cesaro and Styles vs. Carrillo, all of which he gave a score of 8 out of 10, but gave bad ratings to both Lesnar vs. Velasquez and Fury vs. Strowman, calling them "[matches] that nobody except the WWE cared about".

Jason Powell of Pro Wrestling Dot Net stated that while 2019's Crown Jewel was the best WWE PPV held in Saudi Arabia so far, "unfortunately, that's not saying much". Velasquez and Fury being new to professional wrestling made their matches "more interesting" than previous WWE matches in Saudi Arabia, however they "just didn't click going into the show". Fury-Strowman was "weak and forgettable", while WWE played it "safe" with Velasquez. For the tag team turmoil match, Powell liked The O.C. win and the segment involving The Revival and The New Day, but felt that the rest of the match was "pretty random", with the victory seemingly due to "luck of the draw than a major achievement". Powell approved of The Fiend becoming champion, but disliked everything else about the main event, describing it as "horror movie campiness" which was "getting worse the more its repeated".

Tim Fiorvanti, Matt Wilansky, and Marc Raimondi for ESPN wrote that The Fiend becoming champion overshadowed the "unsustainability" of his invincible character, Rollins being left "in no-man's land in terms of crowd reaction and momentum", and the main event having poor lighting and being too long. The 10-man match was "must-see" due to their team leaders Hogan and Flair, and was ultimately about "elevating Reigns, who has not had a significant storyline for months". Fury "didn't look terrible" in his match, but Strowman failed to gain a "mainstream rub" and "didn't come across as a monster" at all. Styles-Carrillo was "entertaining", but the live audience was not interested.

Dave Meltzer of the Wrestling Observer Newsletter rated the matches of the event. Cesaro-Mansoor and Team Hogan-Team Flair were the highest rated at 3.75 stars. The next highest was the US title match at 2.75 stars. The Universal title match was rated 2 stars. The lowest rated matches were Fury-Strowman at 0 stars, and Lesnar-Velasquez at -1 stars.

=== Women's match ===
The women's match between Natalya and Lacey Evans was considered average in quality; although it was largely celebrated by WWE as groundbreaking, media outlets had polarized reactions.

Dave Meltzer wrote that although WWE claimed that "the match was a major cultural breakthrough" in Saudi Arabia, it was really "not a Sputnik Monroe situation which changed local culture". This was because "many women performers have [already] been invited to Saudi Arabia", with the city of Riyadh's current promotion of sports and entertainment. Regarding the match, Meltzer rated it 2 stars and wrote that it was "very basic, by design", to avoid "anything that would be taken wrongly" - explaining why Evans did not play her usual character with "sexy" traits. With "no heel or face or heat, and both not having noticeable ring costumes, it came across more like two women in a gym going through wrestling practice sequences".

Heavy.com reacted very positively. While considering the match itself only "a halfway-decent match here that was a mild step above your usual house show bout", he added that "This bout was clearly put in place to break barriers and further WWE's 'Women's Evolution' for the proud ladies in attendance and watching all over the world. And for that, I have to give it the utmost props". Canoe.com claimed that "nobody seemed to care about who won or lost. Not Evans, Natalya or the fans. The historic match was about and meant so much more".

Conversely, Newsweek called the match part of "Crown Prince Mohammed bin Salman's [intent on] luring major sports event [...] to position the ultra-conservative Islamic country as more liberal and diversify its economy away from depending on the oil industry as part of its Saudi Vision 2030 plan", with Saudi Arabian Amnesty International researcher Dana Ahmed calling the match "a prime example how the Saudi Arabian authorities are using elite sports to try to 'sportswash' their dire human rights record and image internationally".

CBS Sports criticized Michael Cole's commentary for "trying to put over the progressiveness of Saudi Arabia" during the match.

== Travel delays controversy ==
After Crown Jewel ended, it was reported that a flight back to the United States, carrying almost 200 of WWE's wrestlers and other employees, had experienced a major delay on the tarmac. WWE attributed the delay to "aircraft problems including mechanical issues", while the plane's owner, Atlas Air, stated that repairs would be made.

However, as reported in The Hindustan Times, former WWE commentator Hugo Savinovich stated he was told a different explanation for the delay by a WWE executive as well as a source in Saudi Arabia. Savinovich claimed that because Saudi Arabia had failed to pay WWE millions of dollars for previous shows, WWE Chairman Vince McMahon had stopped the television feed for Crown Jewel from being broadcast in Saudi Arabia, leading to Saudi Crown Prince Mohammed bin Salman retaliating by stopping WWE's chartered plane from leaving.

Wrestling journalist Dave Meltzer reported that WWE had not been paid for their shows in Saudi Arabia by September 30, 2019, while WWE was paid $60 million in around two hours before Crown Jewel. According to Meltzer, 20 WWE employees (including 12 wrestlers) managed to leave Saudi Arabia on private jets without delay; this group included Vince McMahon, Kevin Dunn, Brock Lesnar, Paul Heyman, Hulk Hogan, Ric Flair and Tyson Fury. Meltzer quoted that the delayed WWE wrestlers were disbelieving of whether mechanical issues really occurred, because of the presence of military police and that it took around 24 hours before WWE employees eventually left. Meltzer also stated that WWE wrestlers were angry at McMahon for leaving without them.

As the affected personnel would not be able to make it back in time for the following night's episode of Friday Night SmackDown in Buffalo, New York, the show was retooled to rely primarily on talent who did not participate at Crown Jewel, including the women's roster, and NXT (which began developing an angle for Survivor Series by declaring war against SmackDown and Raw), while the WWE Championship match from Crown Jewel (also the shortest match of the entire show) was replayed in its entirety. SmackDown contributor Renee Young, along with NXT UK's Tom Phillips, 205 Live's Aiden English, and Pat McAfee, filled in as guest commentators, and Kayla Braxton filled in as a ring announcer.

WWE announced on November 4, 2019, that it had "expanded" its partnership with the General Authority for Entertainment through 2027, under which it would hold two "large-scale events" in the country per-year.

== Aftermath ==
On the following SmackDown, Paul Heyman described Brock Lesnar's victory at Crown Jewel (which was replayed in full at his request) as being "spiritually orgasmic". Heyman also announced that Lesnar had quit SmackDown and moved to Raw (taking the WWE Championship with him as the Universal Championship had been transferred to SmackDown following The Fiend's victory) in order to seek revenge against Rey Mysterio for his actions following the match. On the following Raw, after attacking crew members and commentator Dio Maddin, Lesnar was repeatedly attacked by Mysterio with a steel pipe. Mysterio then challenged Lesnar for the WWE Championship at Survivor Series, which was made official. The match was then stipulated as a No Holds Barred match.

A Crown Jewel event was not held in 2020 due to the COVID-19 pandemic, but the event returned in 2021. The 2021 event was also the first Crown Jewel to livestream on Peacock after the American version of the WWE Network merged under Peacock in March that year.

== Results ==
No.	Results	Stipulations	Times
1^{P}	Humberto Carrillo won by last eliminating Erick Rowan (Note: Other competitors by order of elimination: Drake Maverick, Heath Slater, Tony Nese, The Brian Kendrick, Eric Young, Mojo Rawley, Sin Cara, Titus O'Neil, No Way Jose, Akira Tozawa, Shelton Benjamin, Apollo Crews, Buddy Murphy, R-Truth, Andrade, Sunil Singh, Cedric Alexander, and Luke Harper.)	20-man Battle Royal; Winner faced AJ Styles for the WWE United States Championship on the main card.	12:25
2	Brock Lesnar (c) (with Paul Heyman) defeated Cain Velasquez (with Rey Mysterio) by submission	Singles match for the WWE Championship	2:10
3	The O.C. (Luke Gallows and Karl Anderson) won by last eliminating The Viking Raiders (Erik and Ivar)	Tag Team Turmoil match for the WWE Tag Team World Cup	32:05
4	Mansoor defeated Cesaro by pinfall	Singles match	12:45
5	Tyson Fury defeated Braun Strowman by countout	Singles match	8:05
6	AJ Styles (c) (with Luke Gallows and Karl Anderson) defeated Humberto Carrillo by pinfall	Singles match for the WWE United States Championship	12:35
7	Natalya defeated Lacey Evans by submission	Singles match	7:20
8	Team Hogan (Roman Reigns, Rusev, Ricochet, Shorty G, and Mustafa Ali) (with Hulk Hogan and Jimmy Hart) defeated Team Flair (Randy Orton, Baron Corbin, Bobby Lashley, Shinsuke Nakamura, and Drew McIntyre) (with Ric Flair) by pinfall	10-man tag team match	19:55
9	"The Fiend" Bray Wyatt defeated Seth Rollins (c) by pinfall	Falls Count Anywhere match for the WWE Universal Championship; Match could not have been stopped for any reason.	21:50
(c) / – the champion(s) heading into the match; P / – the match was broadcast on the pre-show

=== World Cup tag team turmoil match ===
Eliminated	Wrestler	Team	Entered	Eliminated by	Method of elimination	Times
1	Gran Metalik	Lince Dorado and Gran Metalik	2	Dolph Ziggler and Robert Roode	Pinned after a Glorious DDT	5:43
2	Zack Ryder	Curt Hawkins and Zack Ryder	3	Dolph Ziggler and Robert Roode	Pinned after a Zig-Zag	6:53
3	Robert Roode	Dolph Ziggler and Robert Roode	1	Heavy Machinery (Otis and Tucker)	Pinned after the Compactor	13:25
4	Tucker	Heavy Machinery (Otis and Tucker)	4	The New Day (Big E and Kofi Kingston)	Pinned after the Midnight Hour	17:30
5	Curtis Axel	The B-Team (Curtis Axel and Bo Dallas)	6	The New Day (Big E and Kofi Kingston)	Pinned after a Big Ending	19:40
6	Scott Dawson	The Revival (Scott Dawson and Dash Wilder)	7	The New Day (Big E and Kofi Kingston)	Pinned after an inside cradle	25:10
7	Kofi Kingston	The New Day (Big E and Kofi Kingston)	5	Luke Gallows and Karl Anderson	Pinned after a Magic Killer	27:00
8	Erik	The Viking Raiders (Erik and Ivar)	9	Luke Gallows and Karl Anderson	Pinned after a Magic Killer	32:05
Winners	Luke Gallows and Karl Anderson		8	—N/a		32:05
