= Crown Jewel (2024) =

WWE premium live event

- Promotional poster featuring Cody Rhodes, Gunther, Nia Jax, and Liv Morgan
- Promotion: WWE
- Brand(s): Raw; SmackDown
- Date: November 2, 2024
- City: Riyadh, Saudi Arabia
- Venue: Mohammed Abdo Arena
- Attendance: 20,000
- Tagline: First Ever Crown Jewel Champion: Champion vs. Champion

WWE event chronology
← Previous; NXT Halloween Havoc	Next → Survivor Series: WarGames

WWE in Saudi Arabia chronology
← Previous; King and Queen of the Ring	Next → Night of Champions

Crown Jewel chronology
← Previous; 2023	Next → 2025

The 2024 Crown Jewel was a professional wrestling premium live event (PLE) produced by the American company WWE, held for wrestlers from the promotion's main roster brands, Raw and SmackDown. It was the sixth Crown Jewel and took place on Saturday, November 2, 2024, at the Mohammed Abdo Arena in Riyadh, Saudi Arabia. The event was held as part of the city's annual Riyadh Season festivities and aired live at 7:00 p.m. Arabia Standard Time (1:00 p.m. Eastern Time). This year's edition introduced the Crown Jewel Championship matches, contested between the respective reigning men's and women's world champions of Raw and SmackDown to determine the better champions, becoming annual matches for the event.

This was the 12th event that WWE held in Saudi Arabia under a 10-year partnership in support of Saudi Vision 2030. It was also WWE's first PLE to broadcast on Netflix in Brazil, Chile, and Spain, which moved to the platform on November 1. This was also the final Crown Jewel to air on Disney+ Hotstar in Indonesia, Binge in Australia, and the standalone WWE Network in most other international markets due to WWE's content in those areas moving to Netflix in January 2025. It would also be the last Crown Jewel to air on SonyLIV in India and Peacock in the United States as India moved to Netflix in April 2025 and ESPN's direct-to-consumer streaming service assumed the streaming rights to the main roster PLEs in the US beginning in September 2025. While originally established as an annual event for Riyadh, the 2025 edition was held in Australia due to the scheduling of the 2026 Royal Rumble in the city but with the 2026 Crown Jewel planned to return to Riyadh.

Six matches were contested at the event with a seventh that never officially started and was ruled a no contest. While the event was primarily held for Raw and SmackDown, one match involved wrestlers from WWE's developmental brand, NXT. The event was based around the crowning of the inaugural men's and women's Crown Jewel Champions. In the main event, SmackDown's Undisputed WWE Champion Cody Rhodes defeated Raw's World Heavyweight Champion Gunther to become the inaugural men's Crown Jewel Champion, while earlier on the card, Raw's Women's World Champion Liv Morgan defeated SmackDown's WWE Women's Champion Nia Jax to become the inaugural Women's Crown Jewel Champion. In other prominent matches, LA Knight defeated Andrade and Carmelo Hayes to retain SmackDown's WWE United States Championship, and in the opening bout, The Bloodline (Solo Sikoa, Jacob Fatu, and Tama Tonga) defeated Roman Reigns and The Usos (Jey Uso and Jimmy Uso) in a six-man tag team match.

== Production ==
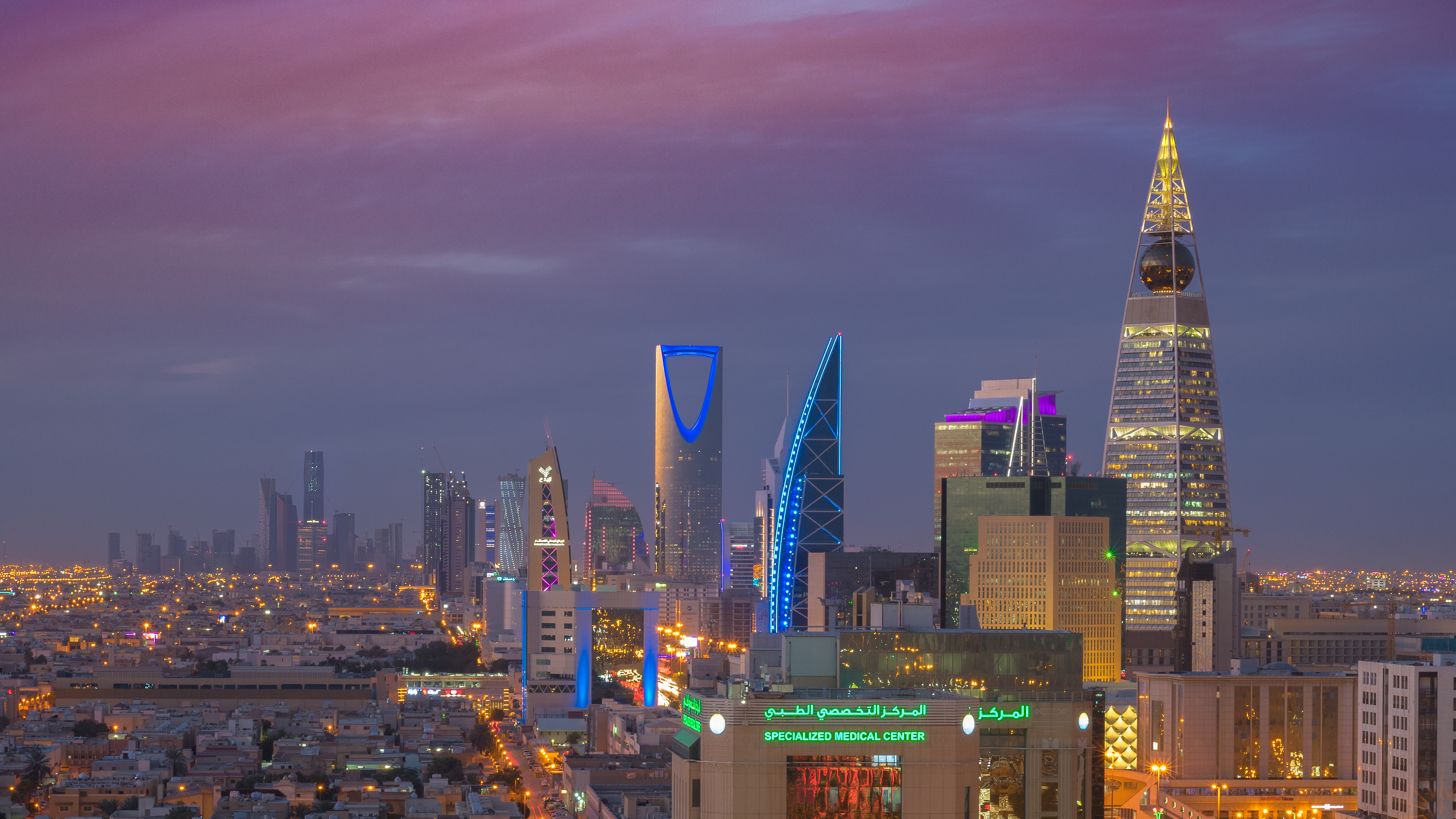
The sixth Crown Jewel was the third time for the event, after 2021 and 2023, to be held at the Mohammed Abdo Arena in Riyadh, Saudi Arabia (pictured).

=== Background ===
Crown Jewel is a professional wrestling premium live event (PLE) produced by the American company WWE since 2018, held in late October–early November in Riyadh, Saudi Arabia. It has been held every year since, except in 2020 due to the COVID-19 pandemic, and it is held as part of the city's annual Riyadh Season festivities, which began in 2019. It is the main recurring event held as part of a 10-year strategic multiplatform partnership with the Ministry of Sport (formerly General Sports Authority) in support of Saudi Vision 2030, Saudi Arabia's social and economic reform program, a partnership that began in early 2018.

Announced during King and Queen of the Ring on May 25, 2024, the sixth Crown Jewel, and 12th overall event in the Saudi Arabian partnership, was scheduled to be held on Saturday, November 2, 2024, at the Mohammed Abdo Arena, and primarily featured wrestlers from the promotion's Raw and SmackDown brand divisions. Additionally, the November 4 episode of Monday Night Raw was taped at the same venue on November 3. The official theme song of the event was "ARABI" by Future, Mohamed Ramadan, and Massari.

=== Broadcast outlets ===
The PLE was broadcast on traditional pay-per-view (PPV) outlets worldwide. It was also available to livestream on Peacock in the United States, SonyLIV in India, Disney+ Hotstar in Indonesia, Disney+ in the Philippines, Binge in Australia, Abema in Japan, Netflix in Brazil, Chile, Spain, and New Zealand, and the WWE Network everywhere else. This was WWE's first PLE to broadcast on Netflix in Brazil, Chile, and Spain, which moved to the platform on November 1, marking the debut of Miguel Pérez and Álvaro Carrera as commentators in Castilian Spanish. With the event held in Saudi Arabia, it aired live at 7:00 p.m. Arabia Standard Time (1:00 p.m. Eastern Time).

Following an announcement made on January 23, this was the final Crown Jewel to air on the standalone WWE Network in most international markets where it was still available, as well as Disney+ Hotstar and Binge, as its content moved to Netflix in January 2025; a select few territories maintained the standalone WWE Network until early 2026 due to pre-existing contracts before they also merged under Netflix when those contracts expired.

=== Storylines ===
The event included six matches that resulted from scripted storylines. Results were predetermined by WWE's writers on the Raw and SmackDown brands, while storylines were produced on WWE's weekly television shows, Monday Night Raw and Friday Night SmackDown.

During Bad Blood, WWE Chief Content Officer (CCO) Paul "Triple H" Levesque announced that at Crown Jewel, the reigning men's and women's world champions of Raw and SmackDown would face each other; however, their respective titles would not be defended and instead, the respective winners would be crowned the inaugural men's and women's Crown Jewel Champions. He also announced that this would be an annual match for Crown Jewel to determine who is the "best of the best". Liv Morgan and Nia Jax would retain their respective titles at Bad Blood—Raw's Women's World Championship and SmackDown's WWE Women's Championship—thus setting up the Women's Crown Jewel Championship match. As SmackDown's Undisputed WWE Champion Cody Rhodes did not have a title defense at Bad Blood, he was automatically entered into the men's match. His opponent was determined by Raw's World Heavyweight Championship match on the October 7 episode of Raw where Gunther retained, thus setting up the men's Crown Jewel Championship match.

On the August 5 episode of Raw, Bronson Reed brutally attacked Seth "Freakin" Rollins with six Tsunamis. Rollins sustained internal bruising and cracked ribs (kayfabe) and was ruled to be out of action for an undetermined amount of time. Rollins made a surprise return on the September 30 episode of Raw, costing Reed a Last Monster Standing match against Braun Strowman. After several subsequent altercations between Rollins and Reed, a match between the two was scheduled for Crown Jewel.

After Bad Blood went off the air, fans captured video footage of Kevin Owens attacking Cody Rhodes as he was entering his bus for teaming with Roman Reigns at Bad Blood, both of whom had a long heated rivalry with Reigns and his original Bloodline faction over the last few years, turning Owens heel for the first time since 2022. Randy Orton, a mutual friend of both Owens and Rhodes, attempted to keep the peace, but Owens attacked Orton in the parking lot during the October 11 episode of SmackDown, believing Orton chose Rhodes over him. Orton requested a match with Owens, but was denied by SmackDown General Manager Nick Aldis, who said the decision to not allow the match came from higher ups. Orton subsequently confronted WWE CCO Triple H during the October 25 episode, who in turn scheduled a match between Orton and Owens at Crown Jewel.

Since July, Andrade and Carmelo Hayes had been feuding with each other, with both men securing three victories each in a Best of Seven Series. Also during this time, LA Knight successfully defended the United States Championship against Andrade and Hayes on the September 20 and October 11 episodes of SmackDown, respectively. A seventh match (which was dubbed game seven) between Andrade and Hayes was scheduled for the October 25 episode, where the winner would also earn a future title match against Knight, who served as the special guest referee for the match, but it ended in a no-contest after Knight attacked both men. As a result of his actions, SmackDown General Manager Nick Aldis scheduled Knight to defend the title against both Andrade and Hayes in a triple threat match at Crown Jewel.

After weeks of women's tag teams interfering in each other's matches across Raw, SmackDown, and NXT to try and make a claim at challenging for the WWE Women's Tag Team Championship, as the title is defended across all three brands, the general managers of Raw, SmackDown, and NXT—Adam Pearce, Nick Aldis, and Ava, respectively—met during the October 25 episode of SmackDown and agreed that Bianca Belair and Jade Cargill would defend the title at Crown Jewel in a fatal four-way match against Damage CTRL (Iyo Sky and Kairi Sane) from Raw, Chelsea Green and Piper Niven from SmackDown, and The Meta-Four (Lash Legend and Jakara Jackson) from NXT.

After losing the Undisputed WWE Universal Championship to Cody Rhodes at WrestleMania XL in April, Roman Reigns took an indefinite hiatus while Solo Sikoa took over The Bloodline, claiming himself to be the Tribal Chief and kicking out Jimmy Uso and Paul Heyman from the group while adding The Tongans (Tama Tonga and Tonga Loa) and Jacob Fatu. At SummerSlam in August, Sikoa challenged Rhodes for the championship—which had been truncated to Undisputed WWE Championship—during which, The Bloodline attempted to interfere, prompting Reigns to return and cost Sikoa the match. Reigns and Rhodes then reluctantly agreed to team up to face Sikoa and Fatu at Bad Blood, which saw the return of Jimmy, who helped Reigns and Rhodes win. On the following SmackDown, Jimmy told Reigns they needed help against Sikoa's Bloodline, insinuating to bring back Jimmy's brother Jey Uso, who had left the group on his own terms a year ago and was moved over to Raw, but Reigns was against the idea. Jimmy then appeared on Raw to attempt to make amends himself, but Jey declined. Sikoa and his Bloodline wanted to recruit Jey but they caused Jey to lose his Intercontinental Championship on the October 21 episode of Raw, and Jey in turn caused The Tongans to lose their WWE Tag Team Championship on the October 25 episode of SmackDown. Later, Jey and Jimmy embraced, reuniting The Usos while Reigns watched on. On the October 28 episode of Raw, Jey agreed to appear on that week's SmackDown to make amends with Reigns, and later, it was announced that Reigns and The Usos would face The Bloodline (Sikoa, Fatu, and Tama) in a six-man tag team match at Crown Jewel.

==== Canceled match ====
At Bad Blood, Liv Morgan retained the Women's World Championship against Rhea Ripley with the assistance of the returning Raquel Rodriguez, who would join Morgan in The Judgment Day. It was reported that there had been plans for a match between Ripley and Rodriguez at Crown Jewel, however, Ripley suffered a legitimate orbital bone injury. Ripley was subsequently written off television in a segment on the October 29 episode of NXT, where Morgan and Rodriguez assaulted Ripley in the parking lot of the WWE Performance Center.

== Event ==
Other on-screen personnel
Role:	Name:
English commentators	Michael Cole
English commentators	Corey Graves
Arabic commentators	Faisal Al-Mughaisib
Arabic commentators	Jude Al-Dajani
Latin American commentators	Marcelo Rodriguez
Latin American commentators	Jerry Soto
Brazilian Portuguese commentators	Marco Alfaro
Brazilian Portuguese commentators	Roberto Figueroa
Castilian Spanish commentators	Miguel Pérez
Castilian Spanish commentators	Álvaro Carrera
Ring announcer	Mike Rome
Referees	Danilo Anfibio
Referees	Daphanie LaShaunn
Referees	Eddie Orengo
Referees	Chad Patton
Referees	Ryan Tran
Interviewer	Cathy Kelley
Pre-show panel	Jackie Redmond
Pre-show panel	Big E
Pre-show panel	Sheamus
Pre-show correspondent	Peter Rosenberg

=== Preliminary matches ===
The PLE opened with The Bloodline (Solo Sikoa, Tama Tonga, and Jacob Fatu, accompanied by Tonga Loa) facing Roman Reigns and The Usos (Jey Uso and Jimmy Uso) in a six-man tag team match, which was the first time since 2022 for Reigns and The Usos to team together. While Reigns and Jimmy made their entrance together, Jey made his solo entrance to hype up the crowd. In the climax, Reigns hit Sikoa with a Superman Punch and then set up for a Spear, but Tama climbed on the apron. Reigns pulled Tama inside the ring and he collided with the referee accidentally. Reigns knocked an interfering Loa off the apron. Fatu stopped a Superman Punch and put Reigns down and hit a top rope moonsault. Fatu performed a suicide dive onto Jey and Jimmy onto the floor. Solo hit Reigns with a pair of Samoan Spikes and pinned him to win the match. After the match, Sikoa, Tama, Loa, and Fatu attacked Reigns. They set up a powerbomb onto the announce table on Reigns, but Jey stopped it with a superkick to Fatu. They brought Jey back in the ring, and teamed up on him, wrapping a chair around his neck and placing him in the corner, but Sami Zayn appeared. After a bit of a conversation, Sikoa motioned for a hug. Zayn looked to reciprocate but he instead hit Sikoa with an exploder suplex. The four then fought off the group, while Sikoa was surrounded by all four. Reigns went for a Superman Punch while Zayn simultaneously went for a Helluva Kick, but Sikoa moved, with Zayn hitting Reigns with the Helluva Kick, while Sikoa laughed. Jimmy and Jey argued about it, with Jey taking Sami's side, before Jey and Zayn left.

Next, Bianca Belair and Jade Cargill defended the WWE Women's Tag Team Championship against Damage CTRL (Iyo Sky and Kairi Sane), Meta-Four (Lash Legend and Jakara Jackson), and Chelsea Green and Piper Niven in a fatal four-way tag team match. Sky launched herself towards Jackson, but a botch occurred when Jackson (who was seated on the top rope) and Sky came up short. Green then prepared for a moonsault to the floor, but she lowered to the bottom rope and reconsidered. Green jumped from the apron instead and was caught. Sky hit a top rope moonsault onto three opponents onto the floor. Jackson jumped off the shoulders of Legend and onto her opponents on the floor. In the ring, Sane hit a spinning back fist on Belair, while Sky suplexed Belair. Sky grabbed Sane, who dropped a flying elbow on Belair. Legend tossed Sane into a powerbomb by Jackson. Green hit a Codebreaker on Jackson and Niven performed a splash on Jackson while she was standing on Green's knees. Niven accidentally splashed Green. Belair and Cargill then hit a Doomsday Device on Niven, and Belair pinned her to win the match and retain their titles.

After that, Seth "Freakin" Rollins faced Bronson Reed. Rollins came out and attacked Reed as he was making his entrance. Reed slammed Rollins into the timekeepers' area and both wrestlers entered the ring to start the match. Reed immediately performed a Tsunami. Reed went for another, but Rollins moved and hit him with a Stomp. Later, Rollins Stomped Reed onto the piece of steel steps that he had been carrying. Reed rolled back in the ring, and Rollins hit him with another Stomp, buy Reed got back to his feet and Rollins hit him with a Super Stomp and pinned him to win the match. After the match, Reed got back to his feet and glared at Rollins, who looked shocked. Reed motioned for Rollins to return, but Rollins jawed at him while backing up the ramp.

In the fourth match, Raw's Women's World Champion Liv Morgan faced SmackDown's WWE Women's Champion Nia Jax for the inaugural WWE Women's Crown Jewel Championship. Morgan hit a DDT and covered Jax for a two count. Jax hit Morgan with a Samoan Drop from the middle rope for a near-fall. Morgan hit a sunset bomb from the ropes. Tiffany Stratton came out with her Money in the Bank briefcase. Jax confronted Stratton at ringside and told her to leave. Stratton walked up the entrance ramp, while Jax returned to the ring and hit another Samoan Drop. Morgan hooked Jax into a pin for a two count. Stratton stopped at the ramp and returned to ringside, while Jax slammed Morgan to the mat for a two count. Stratton climbed on the apron and tried to tell the referee she was cashing in, but Raquel Rodriguez appeared and stopped her, with "Dirty" Dominik Mysterio also appearing at ringside. Morgan and Rodriguez confronted Stratton. Jax hit Morgan and Rodriguez from behind, but this resultee in squishing Stratton between them and the barricade. Back in the ring, Jax hit a leg drop on Morgan and went to the ropes for an Annihilator. Mysterio distracted the referee by sliding the briefcase into the ring. Rodriguez knocked Jax off the ropes with a kick, and Morgan hit an Ob-Liv-Ion and pinned Jax to win the match, thus becoming the first WWE Women’s Crown Jewel Champion. After the match, Triple H entered the ring and presented Morgan with the championship belt and raised her hand in celebration.

After that, Randy Orton was scheduled to face Kevin Owens. As Orton made his entrance, he did his signature pose but was attacked by Owens with a steel chair. The two continued brawling until a group of producers and referees ran out, thus resulting in a no-contest. Orton attempted to hit Owens in the back with the chair, but producer Shawn Daivari ran in and took it from him. Orton took out Daivari with an RKO and dropped Owens with a Draping DDT. SmackDown General Manager Nick Aldis and Raw General Manager Adam Pearce appeared to talk Orton down, but Orton gave the latter an RKO. Aldis fled to ringside. Owens raked Owens' eyes, pulled him to the ringside, and shoved him into the ringpost. Orton tossed Owens over the barricade and followed him. Owens grabbed a small road case and slammed it over Orton's head. He hit Orton with the case multiple times and placed him on a table. Owens then climbed onto a staircase above the main floor and hit a flying elbow drop on Orton through the table.

In the penultimate match, LA Knight defended the United States Championship against Carmelo Hayes and Andrade. To start the match, Andrade and Hayes traded forearms, while Knight stood back and watched. Knight threw punches at both competitors. In the climax, Hayes set up a facebuster, but Knight cut in and hit Hayes with the BFT and pinned him and retain his championship.

=== Main event ===
In the main event, Raw's World Heavyweight Champion Gunther faced SmackDown's Undisputed WWE Champion Cody Rhodes for the inaugural WWE Crown Jewel Championship. To start the match, Rhodes set up a Bionic Elbow, but Gunther blasted Rhodes with a chop. Gunther mocked Rhodes by doing one of his poses while looking at the crowd. Rhodes came back with a clothesline that sent Gunther to ringside. Gunther returned to the apron and was hit with a Disaster Kick. Gunther returned to the ring and caught Rhodes in a sleeper, but Rhodes escaped and sent him back to the floor. Rhodes went for a suicide dive that Gunther stopped. Gunther went on the offensive. Rhodes went for a bodyslam, but his lower back gave out. Gunther targeted the lower back and posed for the crowd. In the climax, Rhodes went to the ropes for a Super Codycutter, but Gunther caught him in a sleeper hold. Rhodes rolled back over Gunther into a pin and the referee counted the three for Rhodes to become the inaugural Crown Jewel Champion. After the match, Gunther shook hands with Rhodes as a sign of respect. Gunther jawed at Rhodes, who nodded, as Gunther exited the ring. Triple H then entered the ring with Saudi Arabia representatives to present Rhodes with the Crown Jewel Championship. Morgan entered the ring and the two celebrated as the inaugural Crown Jewel Champions.

== Reception ==
Dave Meltzer of the Wrestling Observer Newsletter ranked the men's Crown Jewel Championship match 4.25 stars, the Seth Rollins vs. Bronson Reed match 4 stars, the United States Championship match 3.75 stars, the Women's Tag Team Championship and the Roman Reigns and The Usos vs. The Bloodline matches 3.5 stars each, and the Women's Crown Jewel Championship match 1.5 stars.

== Aftermath ==
During the Crown Jewel post-event press conference, a presentation was held where Cody Rhodes and Liv Morgan were both presented with a Crown Jewel ring (similar to a Super Bowl ring) for becoming the inaugural men's and women's Crown Jewel Champions. The championship belts were then placed in display cases at the WWE Experience attraction in Riyadh.

As a result of the Royal Rumble in January 2026 being held as part of the 2025–2026 Riyadh Season, the 2025 Crown Jewel was held in Australia. The 2026 Crown Jewel, however, is planned to return to Riyadh.

=== Raw ===
On the following episode of Raw, Women's World Champion Liv Morgan, Raquel Rodriguez, and "Dirty" Dominik Mysterio celebrated Morgan's victory over Nia Jax at Crown Jewel. WWE Women's Tag Team Champions Bianca Belair and Jade Cargill then interrupted the trio, after which, Morgan taunted them, insinuating that their friendship would fall apart as soon as they lost their titles, only for Belair to challenge Morgan and Rodriguez to a match. A heated altercation then ensued, during which prompted Raw General Manager Adam Pearce to become out and restore order, however, Belair slapped Morgan, resulting in Pearce scheduling a battle royal with the winner facing Morgan for her championship. During the match, Morgan and Rodriguez interfered and eliminated Belair and Cargill. Damage CTRL's Iyo Sky went on to win the match by last eliminating Lyra Valkyria.

Later that night, as Sami Zayn attempted to cut an in-ring promo, he was interrupted by Jey Uso, who thanked Zayn for having his back at Crown Jewel, however, Jey questioned if his Helluva kick to Roman Reigns was an accident or intentional. This brought out Jimmy Uso, who claimed the kick was on purpose and implored Jey not to trust Zayn. Zayn then stated to Jey that he went to Crown Jewel to make sure Jey was okay, and stated that it felt good to be reunited with them, but that it went downhill as it always did. Before Zayn left, Jey asked him to come to SmackDown so they could talk it out like family, only for Jimmy to state that he was not family. Jey stated that although Zayn was not blood-related, it did not mean he was not family. Later on, Jimmy felt hesitant to trust Zayn, given their past issues.

In the main event of Raw, a fatal four-way match between The Judgment Day's "Dirty" Dominik Mysterio, Sheamus, Damian Priest, and Seth "Freakin" Rollins was held to determine the number one contender for the World Heavyweight Championship. During the match, Bronson Reed viciously attacked Rollins with a Tsunami. Reed would also perform Tsunamis on Sheamus and Priest. Mysterio failed to take advantage, and Priest won the match after performing South of Heaven on Mysterio. Rollins and Reed then had a rematch on the November 18 episode of Raw with Reed winning that time.

=== SmackDown ===
On the following SmackDown, Sami Zayn told Roman Reigns that the kick was an accident and stated it felt good to team with Reigns and The Usos (Jey Uso and Jimmy Uso) again, however, he would only reunite with them against Solo Sikoa's Bloodline if Reigns apologized to Jey for his past mistreatment of him, but Reigns refused. Later that night, Reigns confronted Sikoa and his Bloodline with Sikoa challenging Reigns and a team of his choosing to a WarGames match at Survivor Series: WarGames. Sikoa then introduced Zayn as the fifth member of his team, but Zayn attacked Sikoa with Reigns acknowledging Zayn, officially reuniting the original iteration of The Bloodline (Reigns, The Usos, and Zayn). It was then announced that they would face Sikoa's Bloodline in a WarGames match at the event. Sikoa's Bloodline then included Bronson Reed while Paul Heyman recruited CM Punk.

Also on SmackDown, Kevin Owens and Randy Orton engaged in a brawl which ended with Owens performing a piledriver on Orton, who was then hospitalized. Owens was then scheduled to face Cody Rhodes for the Undisputed WWE Championship at Saturday Night's Main Event XXXVII.

=== Broadcasting changes ===
In addition to the majority of countries moving to Netflix in January 2025, this would also be the final Crown Jewel to air on SonyLIV in India following the expiration of WWE's contract with SonyLIV with India then moving to Netflix in April 2025. Additionally, on August 6, 2025, WWE announced that ESPN's direct-to-consumer streaming service would assume the streaming rights of WWE's main roster PLEs in the United States. This was originally to begin with WrestleMania 42 in April 2026, but was pushed up to September 2025 with Wrestlepalooza. As such, this was the last Crown Jewel to livestream on Peacock in the US.

== Results ==
No.	Results	Stipulations	Times
1	The Bloodline (Solo Sikoa, Jacob Fatu, and Tama Tonga) (with Tonga Loa) defeated Roman Reigns and The Usos (Jey Uso and Jimmy Uso) by pinfall	Six-man tag team match	16:35
2	Bianca Belair and Jade Cargill (c) defeated Damage CTRL (Kairi Sane and Iyo Sky), Meta-Four (Lash Legend and Jakara Jackson), and Chelsea Green and Piper Niven by pinfall	Fatal four-way tag team match for the WWE Women's Tag Team Championship	12:00
3	Seth "Freakin" Rollins defeated Bronson Reed by pinfall	Singles match	12:20
4	Liv Morgan (Raw's Women's World Champion) defeated Nia Jax (SmackDown's WWE Women's Champion) by pinfall	Singles match for the inaugural 2024 WWE Women's Crown Jewel Championship	8:15
5	LA Knight (c) defeated Andrade and Carmelo Hayes by pinfall	Triple threat match for the WWE United States Championship	9:10
6	Cody Rhodes (SmackDown's Undisputed WWE Champion) defeated Gunther (Raw's World Heavyweight Champion) by pinfall	Singles match for the inaugural 2024 WWE Crown Jewel Championship	23:00
(c) / – the champion(s) heading into the match
