= Crown Jewel (2026) =

WWE professional wrestling event

Crown Jewel جوهرة التاج (Arabic)
- Promotional poster featuring Liv Morgan, Chelsea Green, Roman Reigns, and Sami Zayn
- Promotion: WWE
- Brand(s): Raw; SmackDown
- Date: November 7, 2026
- City: Riyadh, Saudi Arabia
- Venue: ANB Arena

WWE event chronology
← Previous; NXT Halloween Havoc	Next → Survivor Series: WarGames

WWE in Saudi Arabia chronology
← Previous; Night of Champions	Next → WrestleMania 43

Crown Jewel chronology
← Previous; 2025	Next → —

The 2026 Crown Jewel, also promoted as Crown Jewel: Riyadh (Arabic: جوهرة التاج: الرياض, romanized: jawharat altaaji: alriyad), was a professional wrestling premium live event (PLE) produced by the American company WWE, held for wrestlers from the promotion's main roster brands, Raw and SmackDown. It was the eighth Crown Jewel and took place on Saturday, November 7, 2026, at the ANB Arena in Riyadh, Saudi Arabia. It was held as part of the city's annual Riyadh Season festivities and aired live at 8:00 p.m. Arabia Standard Time (12:00 p.m. Eastern Time). The event centered around the men's and women's Crown Jewel Championship matches, which featured the respective men's and women's world champions of Raw and SmackDown against each other to determine the better champions.

This was the 16th event that WWE held in Saudi Arabia under a 10-year partnership in support of Saudi Vision 2030. This also returned Crown Jewel to Riyadh, after the 2025 event was held in Australia. This event subsequently marked the first time that WWE held three PLEs in Saudi Arabia in one calendar year, which was due to 2025 only having one. The event was initially set to be held at the Riyadh Season Stadium, a purpose-built temporary outdoor stadium in the King Abdullah Financial District; however, it was moved to the smaller and indoor ANB Arena, reportedly due to security concerns amid conflict in the area as the event was held shortly after the October 2026 attacks on Saudi airports.

Five matches were contested at the event, including one impromptu match. The main event was the 2026 Men's Crown Jewel Championship match, which was won by Raw's World Heavyweight Champion Roman Reigns, who defeated SmackDown's Undisputed WWE Champion Sami Zayn. The 2026 Women's Crown Jewel Championship match saw SmackDown's WWE Women's Champion Chelsea Green defeat Raw's Women's World Champion Liv Morgan, after which, Tiffany Stratton cashed in her Money in the Bank contract and defeated Green to win the WWE Women's Championship. In the other matches on the card, Penta and Je'Von Evans defeated The Vision (Bron Breakker and Austin Theory) to win Raw's World Tag Team Championship, while in the opening bout, which was a featured match from SmackDown, Cody Rhodes defeated Randy Orton in a Last Man Standing match.

== Production ==
=== Background ===
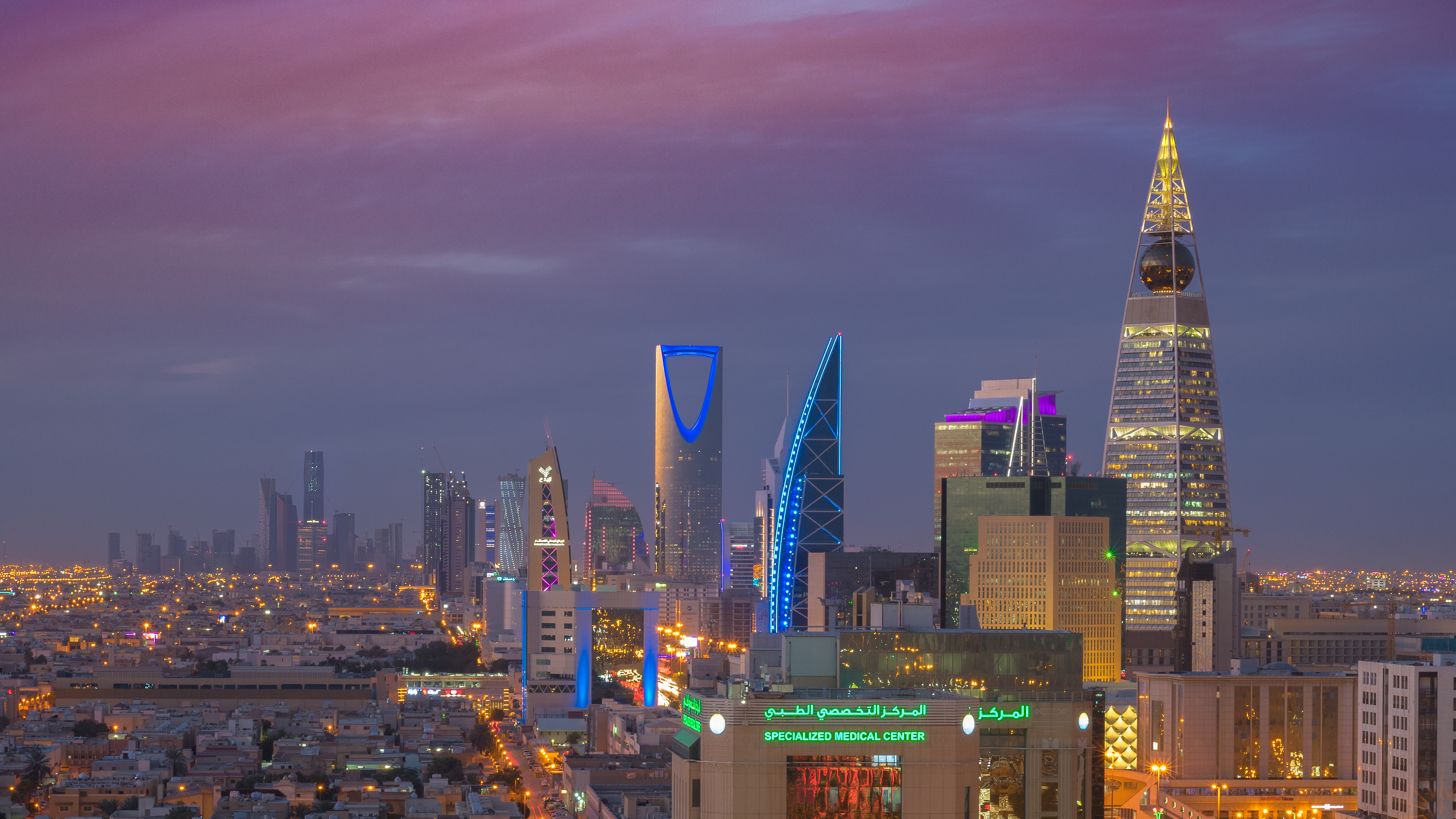
The eighth Crown Jewel was held at the ANB Arena in Riyadh, Saudi Arabia (pictured). This returned Crown Jewel to Riyadh after the 2025 event was held in Australia.

Crown Jewel is a professional wrestling premium live event (PLE) produced by the American company WWE since 2018, typically held in late October–early November. It has been held every year since, except in 2020 due to the COVID-19 pandemic, and with the exception of the 2025 event, it is held in Riyadh, Saudi Arabia, as part of the city's annual Riyadh Season festivities, which began in 2019. It is the main recurring event held as part of a 10-year strategic multiplatform partnership with the Ministry of Sport (formerly General Sports Authority) in support of Saudi Vision 2030, Saudi Arabia's social and economic reform program, a partnership that began in early 2018. Beginning with the 2024 event, Crown Jewel became centered around the men's and women's Crown Jewel Championship matches, held between the respective men's and women's world champions of WWE's Raw and SmackDown brand divisions to determine the better champions.

Announced during the August 31, 2026, episode of Monday Night Raw, the eighth Crown Jewel, and the 16th event in the Saudi Arabian partnership, was scheduled for Saturday, November 7, 2026, in Riyadh. This returned Crown Jewel to the city and as part of Riyadh Season after the previous year's event was held in Australia, with the 2026 event promoted as Crown Jewel: Riyadh. This event subsequently marked the first time that WWE held three PLEs in Saudi Arabia in one calendar year, which was due to 2025 only having one. WWE later announced that Crown Jewel would take place at the Riyadh Season Stadium, a purpose-built temporary outdoor stadium in the King Abdullah Financial District, which had originally been used for WWE's Royal Rumble event earlier in January. However, on October 28, it was announced that the event had been moved to an unspecified different venue in Riyadh.

=== Broadcast outlets ===
The PLE was broadcast on traditional pay-per-view (PPV) outlets worldwide. It was also available to livestream on ESPN Unlimited in the United States, SuperSport in Sub-Saharan Africa, and Netflix everywhere else. With the event being held in Saudi Arabia, it aired live at 8:00 p.m. Arabia Standard Time (12:00 p.m. Eastern Time).

=== Storylines ===
Four matches were scheduled for the event that resulted from scripted storylines. Results were predetermined by WWE's writers on both Raw and SmackDown brands, while storylines were produced on WWE's weekly television shows, Monday Night Raw and Friday Night SmackDown.

At Money in the Bank, Raw's World Heavyweight Champion Roman Reigns retained his title, while SmackDown's Undisputed WWE Champion Sami Zayn successfully retained his title two times before the event, officially setting up the men's Crown Jewel Championship match. On the women's side, 2024 women's Crown Jewel Champion Liv Morgan won Raw's Women's World Championship at Money in the Bank and successfully defended it on the October 26 episode of Raw, while SmackDown's WWE Women's Champion Chelsea Green successfully retained her title two times before the event, officially setting up the women's Crown Jewel Championship match.

In the main event of Night 1 of WrestleMania 42, Cody Rhodes defeated Randy Orton to retain the Undisputed WWE Championship. After the match, Orton attacked Rhodes with a Punt Kick. Rhodes subsequently lost the title, but he got another chance for the title on Night 1 of SummerSlam, where Orton returned, costing Rhodes the title and the match. Their rivalry resumed, leading to a rematch between the two at Sunday Night's Main Event, which Orton won. On the October 23 episode of SmackDown, the brand's General Manager Nick Aldis tried to schedule a match between both men for that night's episode, which Orton declined. Aldis then offered a match between both men at Crown Jewel, with Rhodes saying that he wanted a Last Man Standing match, which Orton agreed.

Over the prior few weeks, Penta and Je'Von Evans had been in a rivalry with The Vision (Austin Theory, Bron Breakker, Bronson Reed, Logan Paul, and Maxxine Dupri). Penta and Evans subsequently defeated World Tag Team Champions Theory and Breakker in a non-title match on the October 5 episode of Raw. Five days later, Penta, Evans, and Breaker competed in the Money in the Bank ladder match at the namesake event; during the match, Breakker viciously attacked Evans, which forced him to be taken out of the match on a stretcher, however, Evans subsequently returned to the match in an ambulance, only to be thrown by Breakker from the top of a ladder onto the roof of the ambulance. Penta subsequently won the match and the contract. On the following episode of Raw, when Evans and Penta were in the ring, Breakker attempted to perform a Spear on Penta, with Evans shoving him off and receiving the Spear instead. This led to a match between Breakker and Penta on the following episode, where Evans came to Penta's aid to fend off an ambush by Theory, allowing Penta to pick up the win. On the October 26 episode, Penta and Evans were ambushed by The Vision following Evans's failed Undisputed WWE Championship match. Backstage while they were recovering, Raw General Manager Adam Pearce told Penta and Evans that they would face Theory and Breakker at Crown Jewel for the World Tag Team Championship, which both men accepted.

== Event ==
Other on-screen personnel
Role	Name
English commentators	Michael Cole
English commentators	Corey Graves
Arabic commentators	Faisal Al-Mughaisib
Arabic commentators	Jude Al-Dajani
Ring announcer	Mark Nash
Referees	Danilo Anfibio
Referees	Chad Patton
Referees	Charles Robinson
Referees	Ryan Tran
Pre-show & post-show panels	Joe Tessitore
Pre-show & post-show panels	Jackie Redmond
Pre-show & post-show panels	Big E
Pre-show & post-show panels	Peter Rosenberg

=== Preliminary matches ===
The PLE opened with a Last Man Standing match between Cody Rhodes and Randy Orton, in which the victor must incapacitate their opponent for a count of 10. As Rhodes and Orton brought the fight to the stage, Orton executed a powerbomb on Rhodes through a table, where Orton positioned Rhodes on his shoulders before slamming Rhodes down. The fight progressed back to ringside, where Rhodes attempted to dive off a ladder onto Orton through the announce table, but Orton evaded and Rhodes crashed through the table instead. Orton attempted a punt kick, where Orton would have hit Rhodes' head with a running kick, but Rhodes avoided. After Orton struck Rhodes' groin, Rhodes later retaliated with three consecutive "Cross Rhodes", bending Orton backwards before twisting to drive Orton down face-first; Orton's head hit the steel steps, which caused Orton's head to bleed. As the referee counted, Rhodes stopped the referee to execute a punt kick. The count was restarted, and Orton failed to beat the 10-count, handing the victory to Rhodes.

Next, The Vision (Bron Breakker and Austin Theory), accompanied by Maxxine Dupri, defended the World Tag Team Championship against Mr. Money in the Bank Penta and Je'Von Evans. Early into the match, Theory made an unsuccessful attempt at tying Penta's mask to a ring rope as Dupri distracted the referee. Penta would later retaliate and attempt a pinfall on Theory, but Dupri placed Theory's foot on the ropes to stop the referee's count. The Vision member Bronson Reed then appeared to attack Penta, which prompted Oba Femi to appear and attack Reed; Femi would then throw Reed off the stage through tables on the arena floor. As Breakker was distracted by Femi, Evans attempted to ambush Breakker with a dive, but Breakker caught Evans by the throat before Penta dove off the top rope onto Breakker. Penta then executed the "Mexican Destroyer" on Theory, flipping forward to flip Theory backwards and land head-first. Evans then followed up with the "OG Cutter", diving off the top rope backwards and grabbed Theory's head to force Theory to fall face-first. Evans then pinned Theory to win the World Tag Team Championship with Penta.

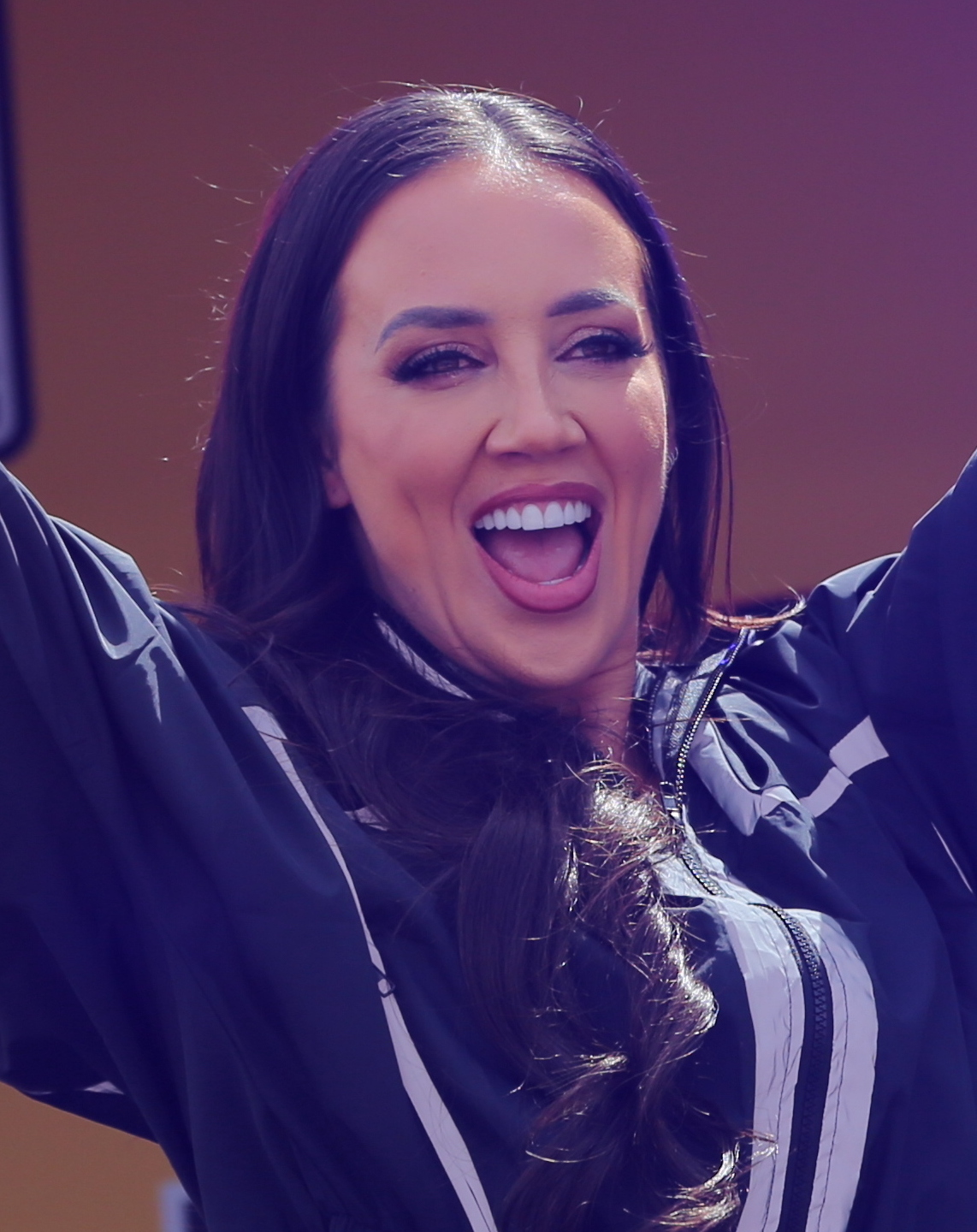
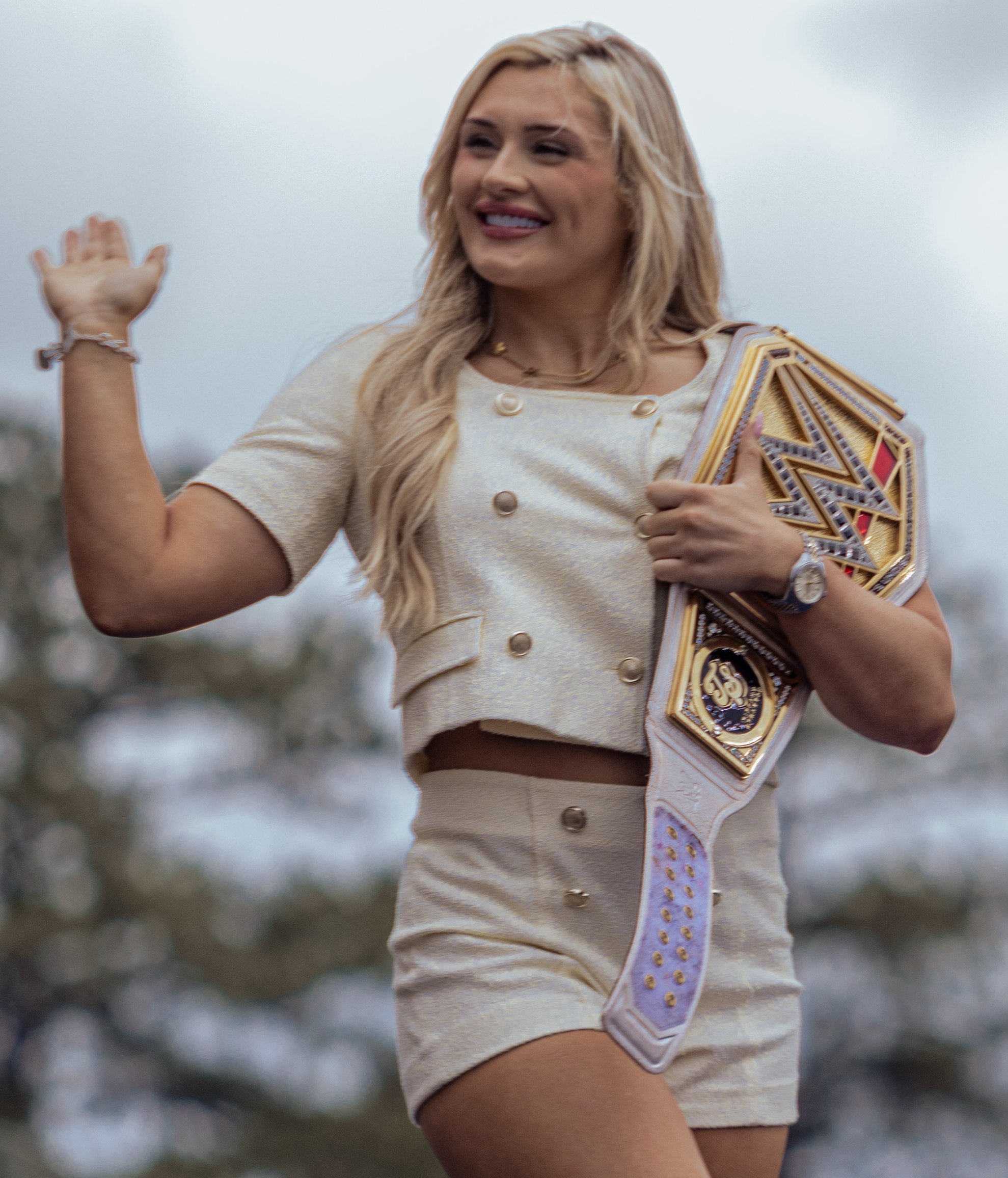
After SmackDown's WWE Women's Champion Chelsea Green (left) won the WWE Women's Crown Jewel Championship, Tiffany Stratton (right) cashed in her Money in the Bank contract and defeated Green to win the WWE Women's Championship.

In the penultimate match, Raw's Women's World Champion Liv Morgan and SmackDown's WWE Women's Champion Chelsea Green battled for the 2026 WWE Women's Crown Jewel Championship. Late into the match, Morgan's The Judgment Day stablemates Raquel Rodriguez and Roxanne Perez appeared, but Morgan instructed them to stay away from the match. Morgan attempted an attack, but Green countered by successfully pinning Morgan to win the Crown Jewel Championship. Following the match, WWE Chief Content Officer Paul "Triple H" Levesque presented the championship belt and the ring to Green. As Green tried to claim to be the greatest champion of all-time in her victory speech, Morgan ambushed her. Tiffany Stratton then appeared and attacked Morgan. Stratton teased cashing in her Money in the Bank contract on an incapacitated Morgan, but Rodriguez and Perez returned to the ring in an attempt to stop Stratton. Green staved them off, but Stratton attacked Green with the Money in the Bank briefcase and cashed in on Green instead. Stratton then executed the "Prettiest Moonsault Ever", flipping backwards off the top rope onto a supine Green, before successfully pinning Green to win the WWE Women's Championship. Stratton also stole the WWE Women's Crown Jewel Championship belt and Crown Jewel ring from Green.

=== Main event ===
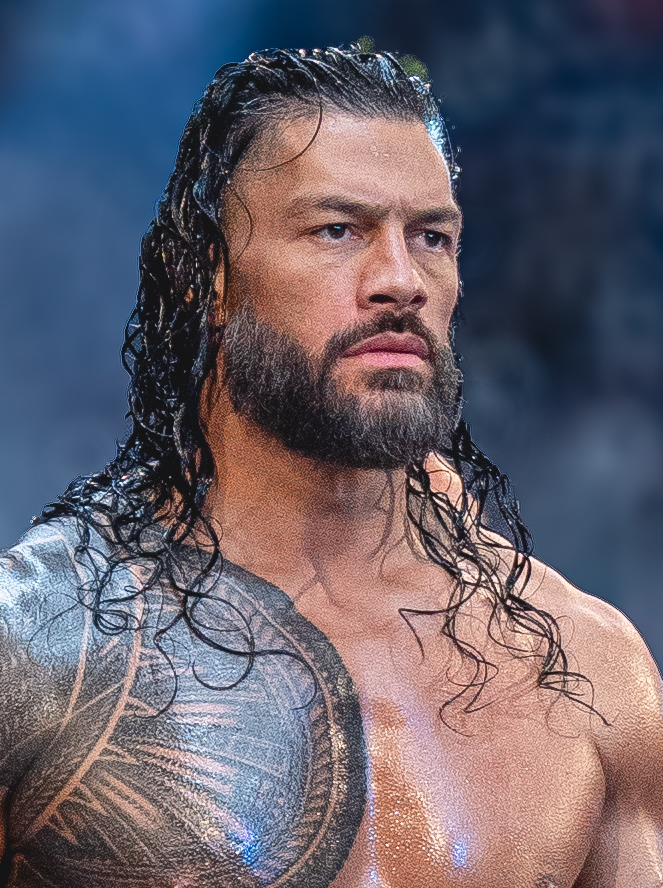
Raw's World Heavyweight Champion Roman Reigns won the 2026 WWE Crown Jewel Championship.

In the main event, Raw's World Heavyweight Champion Roman Reigns and SmackDown's Undisputed WWE Champion Sami Zayn battled for the 2026 WWE Crown Jewel Championship. Zayn attempted a Superman punch, in which Zayn charged at Reigns and jumped forward to punch Reigns' head, but Reigns evaded and Zayn nearly hit referee Chad Patton. Reigns then attempted a Superman punch himself but accidentally hit Patton after Zayn dodged. Zayn then attacked with the "Helluva Kick", where Zayn ran towards Reigns and front kicked Reigns' head in the ring's corner, before attempting a pinfall without a referee, which prompted referee Charles Robinson to appear as a replacement and made the count, but Reigns kicked out. Frustrated, Zayn attacked Robinson. Zayn grabbed his championship belt, but Reigns hit Zayn with a Superman punch. Zayn later attempted to charge towards Reigns, but he was stopped with a spear from Reigns, with Reigns diving into Zayn and causing Zayn to fall. Reigns then executed another spear to get the pinfall victory and win the 2026 WWE Crown Jewel Championship.

Following the match, Zayn asked Reigns to shake his hand as he had felt that he deserved it. Reigns hesitated until he slapped Zayn's hand away to hug Zayn instead. As Zayn left the ring, Reigns told Zayn, "Make them respect you." WWE Chief Content Officer Paul "Triple H" Levesque then presented the WWE Crown Jewel Championship belt and Crown Jewel ring and put the World Heavyweight Championship belt and the ula fala on Reigns, who then told the crowd to acknowledge him.

== Security concerns ==
Following the October 2026 attacks on Saudi airports, which took place less than four weeks to Crown Jewel, concerns were raised regarding the safety of fans and WWE personnel traveling to the event. On October 23, 2026, TKO Group Holdings chief executive officer Ari Emanuel confirmed that Crown Jewel would proceed as planned, but stated that the event could be moved elsewhere if required. On October 28, Riyadh Season announced that the event would be relocated to an unspecified venue in Riyadh. It was initially reported by American wrestling historian Dave Meltzer that the event would be held at the Kingdom Arena. However, that initial report was later corrected when it was confirmed that the event was actually moving to the ANB Arena (formerly The Venue) instead. It was also reported that WWE produced the broadcast remotely from its headquarters in Stamford, Connecticut to reduce the amount of non-essential staff on-site, and that its commentators would also be broadcasting remotely rather than present in-arena.

== Reception ==
Professional ratings
Publication		Matches					Overall	Ref.
Publication		1	2	3	4	5	Overall	Ref.
411Mania	Jeremy Thomas	3.0/5	3.5/5	3.25/5	—N/a	4.0/5	6.5/10	
411Mania	Thomas Hall	C+	B–	C+	—N/a	B	6.5/10	
Asbury Park Press		83/100	86/100	75/100	82/100	94/100	—N/a	
Athlon Sports		B+	B	B–	—N/a	A	B+	
Bleacher Report		D	A–	B–	C	A–	B	
CBS Sports		B	B	C+	—N/a	B+	—N/a	
Súper Luchas		3.75/5	3.75/5	3.5/5	—N/a	5.0/5	—N/a	
TJR Wrestling		4.0/5	3.5/5	3.25/5	—N/a	4.25/5	7.5/10	
Uncrowned		3.25/5	3.75/5	3.75/5	2/5	4/5	6.5/10	
USA Today		B+	B–	C+	—N/a	A	—N/a	
Wrestling Observer Newsletter		3.5/5	3.75/5	2.75/5	—N/a	4.5/5	—N/a	
Match order: 1. Cody Rhodes vs. Randy Orton in a Last Man Standing Match; 2. The Vision (Bron Breakker and Austin Theory) (c) vs. Penta and Je'Von Evans for the World Tag Team Championship; 3. Liv Morgan vs. Chelsea Green for the 2026 WWE Women's Crown Jewel Championship; 4. Chelsea Green (c) vs. Tiffany Stratton for the WWE Women's Championship; 5. Roman Reigns vs. Sami Zayn for the 2026 WWE Crown Jewel Championship

Kevin Berge of Bleacher Report said that the wrestlers over-delivered on an event that did not look good on paper, calling it "one of WWE's more complete nights of pure action in 2026". Steven Harrison of Athlon Sports also praised the "strong" performances, but said that the decision to advertise only four matches was difficult to defend, especially given the cost of streaming services, and that the card compared poorly with the eight to ten matches of older premium live events. Jeremy Thomas of 411Mania described the event as “fine” and “a bit of a throwaway”, while Thomas Hall of 411Mania said that although the wrestling was “[okay]”, the event did not feel important and fell flat at times because of the “meaningless” advertised title matches and the “big letdown” of the Last Man Standing match. John Canton of TJR Wrestling said that he liked most of an otherwise unmemorable show, and Drake Riggs of Uncrowned said that it was not a “glorified house show” like past editions but was “largely predictable and flat”.

Harrison highlighted the chemistry and brutality between Cody Rhodes and Randy Orton, and Canton called it a “very good brawl with a lot of weapon usage”. Jordan Mendoza of USA Today said that although the match and the feud failed to meet expectations, it was the best match the two had in 2026, while Derrick Hubbard of Pro Wrestling Torch felt it was good but did not feel special. Berge and HC Green of Men’s Journal said it lacked the intensity and impact of their WrestleMania 42 encounter, with Green calling it a “complete dud” and Berge saying the feud ended with a “whimper”. Brent Brookhouse of CBS Sports and Hubbard noted that the crowd’s support for Orton over Rhodes hurt the match and the story.

Berge called the World Tag Team Championship match one of the best tag team matches in WWE in 2026, saying that although Penta and Je'Von Evans were a makeshift team, they could help carry a struggling division. Riggs named the match the "Gem of the Night" and Oba Femi as the "MVP of the Day". Hubbard found that the interference of Bronson Reed and Femi added “excitement and drama”. Harrison viewed the title change as a "welcome development" for the tag team division, but Jason Powell of Pro Wrestling Dot Net had mixed feelings about the title change given the lack of stories in the division. Mendoza said the best part of the match came after Femi's appearance, but Canton felt that Femi's full entrance took away from the match. Green criticized Femi's appearance as illogical due to the continuation of his feud with The Vision despite previously claiming the end of the feud.

Thomas thought that the WWE Women's Crown Jewel Championship match was “very well booked” with a great story, and Hubbard said it had a "really good story". Berge likewise praised Liv Morgan and Chelsea Green's ability to tell a "strong consistent story", although he noted a lack of chemistry between them. Canton said that the match had an easy story to tell and the correct outcome, but did not reach the next level to become great. Hall called it "mostly mediocre", but said that Chelsea's underdog victory was what mattered. Mendoza said the one-sided nature of the match did not suit a Champion vs. Champion match and that nothing major happened. Berge and Hubbard criticized the finish, with Berge calling it a non-definitive win and Hubbard saying it made Chelsea’s victory look like a fluke.

Canton thought that Tiffany Stratton's Money in the Bank cash-in match was perfectly booked, saying that it gave Stratton a lot of heat while making Chelsea look sympathetic. Harrison said that Chelsea's emotional victory celebration made Stratton’s betrayal more effective, and Mendoza called it the "best twist of the night". Hubbard said that although he had expected Stratton to turn on Chelsea, he was still surprised by the misdirection. Berge described the cash-in as the expected payoff after weeks of attempts, but concluded that Stratton versus Chelsea instantly became the hottest feud in the women’s division.

Harrison called the WWE Crown Jewel Championship match the main event Crown Jewel needed, saying that Reigns and Zayn’s long history elevated an “already compelling" match. Mendoza said that the emotional investment took the match to another level and that it was the pair's best match together, while Riggs named it the match of the night, particularly by the standard of Reigns's matches in 2026, and picked Zayn landing the "Helluva Kick" as Reigns signaled for a spear as the spot of the night. Berge said that the pair's chemistry made an "over-the-top" match work and that Zayn looked better against Reigns than against any of his recent opponents, as he did not need shortcuts to almost defeat him. Brookhouse and Hubbard said that Zayn earned a moral victory by gaining Reigns' respect despite the clean loss. Canton praised Zayn for competing as an equal to Reigns. Brookhouse also found the later portion of the match "a little goofy" because of Zayn mimicking Reigns's taunts but still called it a “fun enough” main event, and Riggs noted that the match's formulaic nature could be a problem.

== Aftermath ==
=== Raw ===
World Tag Team Champions Penta and Je'Von Evans opened the following episode of Raw to celebrate their victory when they were attacked by Bron Breakker who demanded a match against Oba Femi, to which he accepted. Femi defeated Breakker by disqualification after he was attacked by The Vision (Logan Paul and Austin Theory), but was saved by Penta and Evans.

Also on the same episode of Raw, Cody Rhodes spoke about punting Randy Orton, and was asked how that felt, he stated that "he loved it."

=== SmackDown ===
On the following episode of SmackDown, Undisputed WWE Champion Sami Zayn spoke about his loss against World Heavyweight Champion and WWE Crown Jewel Champion Roman Reigns where he clarified he's not asking for Reigns' validation nor approval, but respect he needed. He then stateed that if Reigns can show him respect, that was the bare minimum that he expected from each and everyone in the stands.

WWE Women's Champion Tiffany Stratton dedicated her win to her "ex-BFF", WWE Women's Crown Jewel Champion Chelsea Green who confronted her and stated that they were clearly never friends, and Stratton was always faking it. Green attempted to retrieve her Crown Jewel ring that Stratton stole, but was told to "enjoy the rest of her career in catering", leading to Green attacking Stratton, but she retaliated by punching Green using the Crown Jewel ring.

== Results ==
No.	Results	Stipulations	Times
1	Cody Rhodes defeated Randy Orton	Last Man Standing match	27:20
2	Penta and Je'Von Evans defeated The Vision (Bron Breakker and Austin Theory) (c) (with Maxxine Dupri) by pinfall	Tag team match for the World Tag Team Championship	14:35
3	Chelsea Green (SmackDown's WWE Women's Champion) defeated Liv Morgan (Raw's Women's World Champion) by pinfall	Singles match for the 2026 WWE Women's Crown Jewel Championship	16:15
4	Tiffany Stratton defeated Chelsea Green (c) by pinfall	Singles match for the WWE Women's Championship; This was Stratton's Money in the Bank cash-in match.	0:03
5	Roman Reigns (Raw's World Heavyweight Champion) defeated Sami Zayn (SmackDown's Undisputed WWE Champion) by pinfall	Singles match for the 2026 WWE Crown Jewel Championship	24:10
(c) / – the champion(s) heading into the match
