= ANB Arena =

Indoor arena in Riyadh, Saudi Arabia

- Interactive map of ANB Arena
- Former names: The Venue (2024)
- Location: 7516 Takhassusi Road, Ar Rahmaniyah District, Riyadh, Saudi Arabia
- Coordinates: 24°46′34.0″N 46°36′24.1″E
- Owner: Public Investment Fund
- Capacity: 8,000

Construction
- Opened: October 16, 2024

ANB Arena, formerly known as The Venue and stylized as anb Arena, is an indoor arena located in Riyadh, Saudi Arabia. The arena first opened in conjunction with the 2024 Riyadh Season.

== History ==
The Venue first opened on October 16, 2024 with the first event being the 2024 Six Kings Slam tennis tournament. In December 2024, Sela announced that they had signed a naming rights deal with the Arab National Bank, renaming The Venue to the ANB Arena.

On February 1, 2025, the arena hosted its first mixed martial arts event with UFC Fight Night: Adesanya vs. Imavov.

Since 2025, the ANB Arena has hosted the Riyadh Comedy Festival, a stand-up comedy festival which featured stand-up comedians such as Kevin Hart, Gabriel Iglesias, and Dave Chappelle. The festival had received backlash for its inaugural by human rights groups and various stand-up comedians accusing the Saudi government of using the event to whitewash the country's image.

On October 30, 2026, WWE announced that the Crown Jewel premium live event would be moved from the Riyadh Season Stadium to the ANB Arena due to the October 2026 attacks on Saudi airports.
