= Mohammed Abdo Arena =

Arena in Riyadh, Saudi Arabia

Artist of the Arabs Mohammed Abdu Stage
- مسرح فنان العرب محمد عبده
- Mohammed Abdo Arena
- Official logo featuring Mohammed Abdu
- Interactive map of Artist of the Arabs Mohammed Abdu Stage
- Location: The Boulevard, Prince Turki Al-Awal Road, Hittin, Riyadh 13513, Saudi Arabia
- Coordinates: 24.773693°N 46.605288°E
- Operator: General Entertainment Authority
- Capacity: 22,000

Construction
- Opened: 17 October 2019

Mohammed Abdo Arena (Arabic: محمد عبده أرينا), officially as the Artist of the Arabs Mohammed Abdu Stage (Arabic: مسرح فنان العرب محمد عبده), is a 22,000 seat Multi-purpose stadium in the Hittin neighborhood of Riyadh, Saudi Arabia, located in the "Theaters" area of Boulevard City recreational complex.

Named after the Saudi singer Mohammed Abdu Othman, it was established following the inauguration of Boulevard City in October 2019 during the beginning week of the first edition of Riyadh Season entertainment festival. Since its inception, the arena has hosted events like The Filipino Night, as well as WWE's Super ShowDown and Crown Jewel.

== History ==
On 12 October 2019, a day after the launch of the 2019 edition of Riyadh Season, the president of General Entertainment Authority Turki al-Sheikh announced the establishment of Mohammed Abdo Arena and Abu Bakr al-Salem Stage through is official Twitter handle.
