= Heavy (website) =

American news website

- Website type: Sports news
- Available in: English, Spanish
- Owner: Heavy Inc.
- Creators: Simon Assaad; David Carson
- Website: heavy.com
- Commercial: Yes
- Registration: Optional
- Launched: September 23, 1998; 27 years ago
- Current status: Active

Heavy (stylized as Heavy.com and heavy.) is a sports news website based in New York City. It publishes sports news and information for an American audience, with a focus on the NFL, NBA, NHL and MLB.

== History ==
Heavy was founded by Simon Assaad and David Carson in 1999 as a video-focused entertainment site aimed primarily at young men, debuting audiovisual pop culture phenomena like the Kung Faux series. Assaad and Carson said they modeled the highly interactive site on video games.

Assaad continues to serve as CEO, and Aaron Nobel is the editor-in-chief.

== Content ==
Heavy primarily aggregates news on sports and trending topics.

The Wall Street Journal's editorial board cited Heavy in an August 2019 story on the mass shooter in Dayton, Ohio, as having "gained access to Connor Betts' Twitter account before it was taken down". Slate cited the website's story on the Quebec City mosque shooting as one of the first to be published in English.

Heavy uses information from original sources whenever possible. They recommend that when citing information from other sources, reporters must clearly cite them and hyperlink to the original source.
