= Riyadh Season Stadium =

Stadium in Riyadh

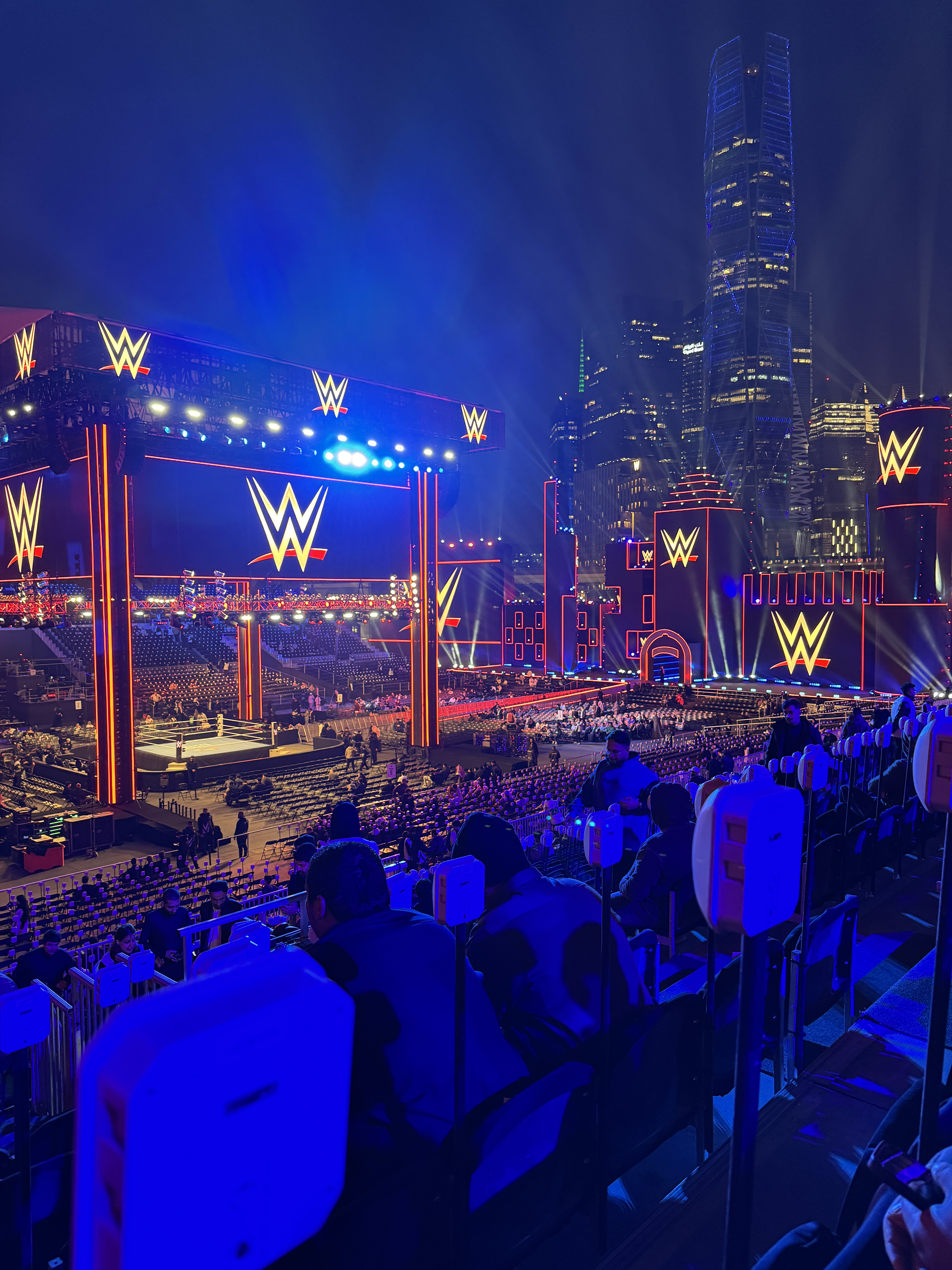
- Interactive map of Riyadh Season Stadium
- Location: King Fahad Branch Road, Al Ghadir District, Riyadh 13519, Saudi Arabia
- Coordinates: 24°46′23.982″N 46°38′37.368″E
- Owner: Public Investment Fund
- Capacity: 25,000

Construction
- Opened: January 30, 2026

Riyadh Season Stadium, also known as Riyadh Season Stadium at KAFD, is a temporary outdoor stadium located in the King Abdullah Financial District in Riyadh, Saudi Arabia. The stadium was originally constructed for WWE's Royal Rumble premium live event and preceding SmackDown episode which took place on January 30 and 31, 2026.

== History ==
In May 2024, the chairman of Saudi Arabia's General Entertainment Authority, Turki Alalshikh, announced that the country was in talks with WWE to bring either the Royal Rumble or WrestleMania to the country in 2026 or 2027. On January 3, 2025, PWInsider reported that WWE would be holding the 2026 Royal Rumble in Saudi Arabia, with Fightful later confirming an official announcement would come during the Raw premiere on Netflix. In January 2026, construction began on a temporary outdoor stadium which would be the host of Royal Rumble. The stadium's construction was criticized by several human rights organizations such as Amnesty International and the Business & Human Rights Resource Centre as having poor working conditions for migrant workers, stemming from systemic labor law violations in the country through the kafala system. On September 1, 2026, WWE announced that the 2026 Crown Jewel premium live event would take place at the stadium., but due to the October 2026 attacks on Saudi airports, on October 28, WWE announced that the show will be relocated, stating that the original venue will no longer host the show.
