= Night of Champions (2023) =

WWE premium live event

Night of Champions ليلة الأبطال (Arabic)
- Promotional poster featuring Roman Reigns and Bianca Belair
- Promotion: WWE
- Brand(s): Raw; SmackDown
- Date: May 27, 2023
- City: Jeddah, Saudi Arabia
- Venue: Jeddah Super Dome
- Attendance: 13,000

WWE event chronology
← Previous; Backlash	Next → NXT Battleground

Night of Champions chronology
← Previous; 2015	Next → 2025

WWE in Saudi Arabia chronology
← Previous; Crown Jewel (2022)	Next → Crown Jewel (2023)

The 2023 Night of Champions (Arabic: ليلة الأبطال, romanized: Laylat al-Abtal) was a professional wrestling premium live event (PLE) produced by the American company WWE, held for wrestlers from the promotion's main roster brands, Raw and SmackDown. It was the 10th Night of Champions and took place on Saturday, May 27, 2023, at the Jeddah Super Dome in Jeddah, Saudi Arabia and aired live at 8:00 p.m. Arabia Standard Time (1:00 p.m. Eastern Time). The original concept of Night of Champions (2007–2015) was that every main roster championship was contested. This theme was not retained for the 2023 event and instead celebrated the crowning of a new World Heavyweight Champion for Raw and also marked the 1,000th day for Roman Reigns as SmackDown's Universal Champion.

This was the first Night of Champions held since 2015, and also the first Night of Champions to take place on a Saturday and the first held in Saudi Arabia, subsequently making it the ninth event that WWE held in the country under a 10-year partnership in support of Saudi Vision 2030. The event was originally announced to be held as a PLE titled "King and Queen of the Ring", which would have reinstated the King of the Ring event series but with a rebranding, however, WWE decided to instead reinstate Night of Champions; King and Queen of the Ring would get rescheduled for 2024 at the same venue. This was in turn the first Night of Champions held following the reintroduction of the brand split in July 2016, which made it the first Night of Champions since 2010 to feature multiple brands during a brand split. It was also the first Night of Champions to livestream on Peacock in the United States, SonyLIV in India, Disney+ Hotstar in Indonesia, Disney+ in the Philippines, and Binge in Australia. The PLE also replaced the previously annual Hell in a Cell event. This was also the first Night of Champions to be branded as a "premium live event", a term the company introduced at the start of 2022 to refer to its events airing on traditional pay-per-view and via WWE's livestreaming platforms. A Night of Champions was not held in 2024, but it returned in 2025.

Seven matches were contested at the event, five of which were championship matches. In the main event, Kevin Owens and Sami Zayn defeated The Bloodline (Roman Reigns and Solo Sikoa) to retain the Undisputed WWE Tag Team Championship. This was one of three matches promoted as part of a triple main event, the other two were a match between Cody Rhodes and Brock Lesnar, which Lesnar won via technical submission, and the match for the aforementioned World Heavyweight Championship, which was the opening bout and saw Raw's Seth "Freakin" Rollins defeat SmackDown's AJ Styles to become the inaugural champion. In another prominent match, Asuka defeated Bianca Belair to win the Raw Women's Championship, ending Belair's record-setting title reign at 420 days. As a result of the 2023 WWE Draft that occurred before the event in April, this was contested as the women's championship of SmackDown with Raw having the SmackDown Women's Championship. This would be the last event for the women's championships to carry a brand name, as two weeks after the event, the Raw and SmackDown women's championships were renamed as the WWE Women's Championship and Women's World Championship, respectively.

The event received mostly positive reviews from critics and fans. The Undisputed WWE Tag Team Championship match and the ending that followed were deemed highlights of the night. Praise was also given to the World Heavyweight Championship match.

== Production ==
=== Background ===
The 10th Night of Champions was held at the Jeddah Superdome in Jeddah, Saudi Arabia (pictured).

On March 6, 2023, the American professional wrestling promotion WWE announced that the King of the Ring event would be reinstated and rebranded as "King and Queen of the Ring" to incorporate both the men's King of the Ring tournament and women's Queen's Crown tournament, renamed as Queen of the Ring, which would also replace the previously annual Hell in a Cell event. The event was scheduled to be held on Saturday, May 27, 2023, at the Jeddah Superdome in Jeddah, Saudi Arabia and feature wrestlers from the Raw and SmackDown brand divisions. On April 13, however, it was revealed that WWE scrapped these plans and that this Saudi Arabian event would instead be the 10th Night of Champions, thus reinstating the Night of Champions event, which had previously been held annually from 2007 to 2015, in turn marking the first Night of Champions since 2015. According to Mike Johnson of PWInsider, the decision to change the event to Night of Champions was a creative choice to revive and bring the event to an international market. It was also reported that the change was to please business partners in Saudi Arabia and add intrigue to the show with the crowning of a new world champion. The King and Queen of the Ring event would be rescheduled for the same venue in May 2024.

In early 2018, WWE began a 10-year strategic multiplatform partnership with the Ministry of Sport in support of Saudi Vision 2030, Saudi Arabia's social and economic reform program. The 2023 Night of Champions was the ninth event that WWE held in Saudi Arabia under this partnership and subsequently the first Night of Champions to be held in the country. It was also the first Night of Champions to be held on a Saturday. This was subsequently the first Night of Champions held following the reintroduction of the brand extension in July 2016, where WWE again split the main roster between the Raw and SmackDown brands where wrestlers were exclusively assigned to perform, which made it the first Night of Champions since 2010 to feature multiple brands during a brand split. This was also the first Night of Champions to be branded as a "premium live event" (PLE), a term the company introduced on January 1, 2022, to refer to its events that are available on pay-per-view (PPV) and via livestreaming.

The original theme of Night of Champions from 2007 to 2015 was that every main roster championship was to be contested. This theme was not retained for the 2023 event, as SmackDown's Undisputed WWE Universal Championship, SmackDown's United States Championship, and the WWE Women's Tag Team Championship, which was available to both brands, were not contested. However, five of the event's seven matches were championship matches. The event also marked the 1,000th day for Roman Reigns as Universal Champion. He won the title at Payback on August 30, 2020, and later won the WWE Championship at WrestleMania 38 in April 2022 to become the Undisputed WWE Universal Champion.

=== Broadcast outlets ===
The PLE was broadcast on traditional PPV outlets worldwide. It was also available to livestream on Peacock in the United States, SonyLIV in India, Disney+ Hotstar in Indonesia, Disney+ in the Philippines, Binge in Australia, and the WWE Network everywhere else. This marked the first Night of Champions to air on SonyLIV, Peacock, Disney+ Hotstar, Disney+, and Binge, after those countries' respective versions of the WWE Network merged under those services in February 2021, April 2021, January 2022, November 2022, and January 2023, respectively. With the event being held in Saudi Arabia, it aired live at 8:00 p.m. Arabia Standard Time (1:00 p.m. Eastern Time).

=== Storylines ===
The event included seven matches that resulted from scripted storylines. Results were predetermined by WWE's writers on the Raw and SmackDown brands, while storylines were produced on WWE's weekly television shows, Monday Night Raw and Friday Night SmackDown.

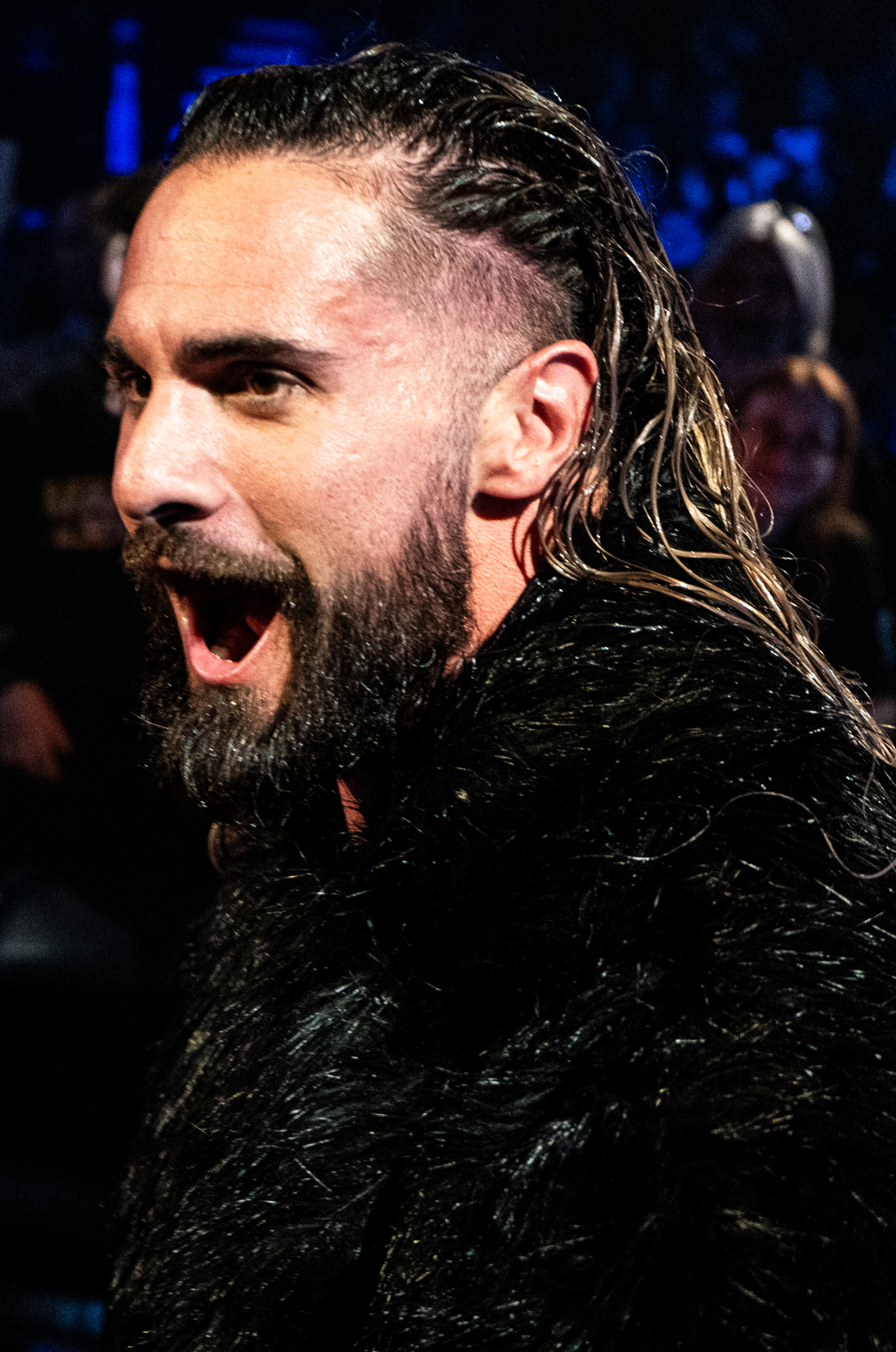
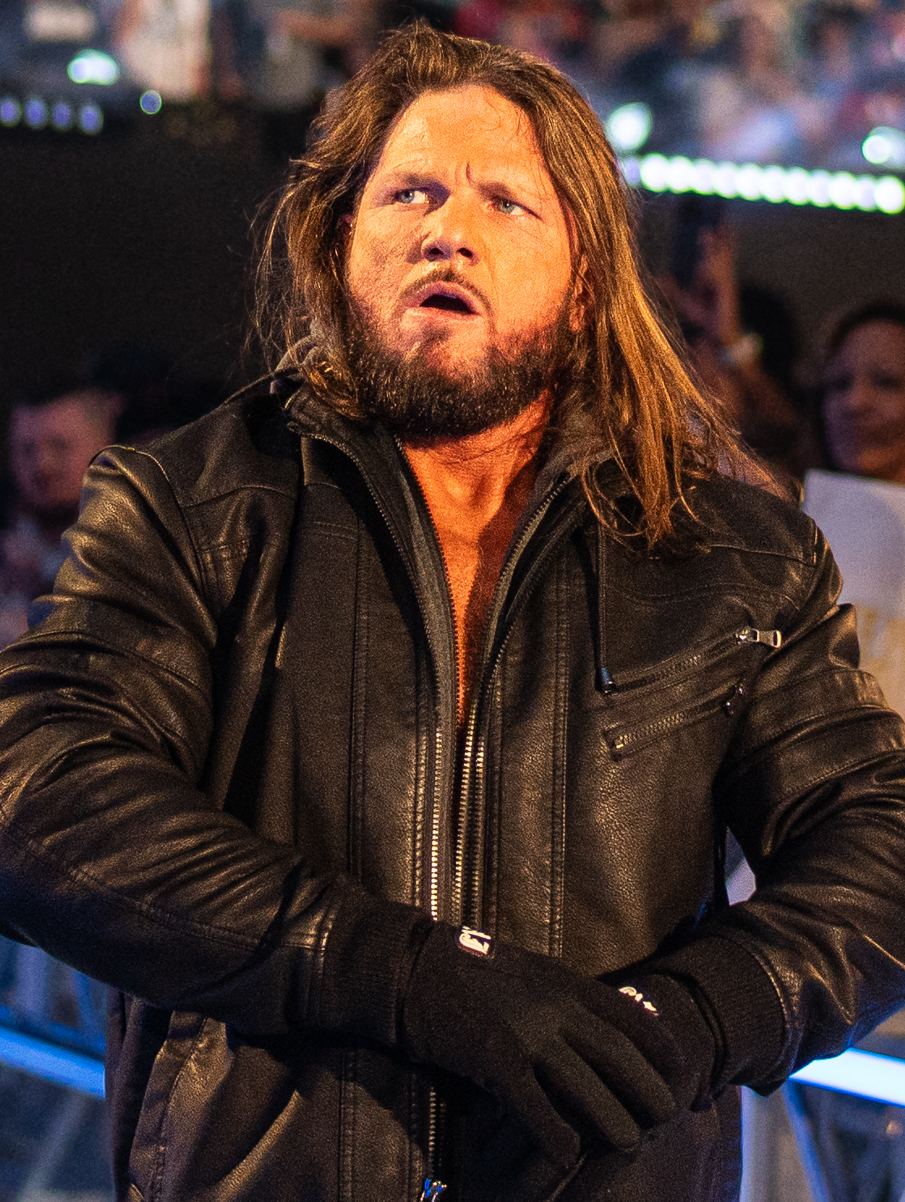
Raw's Seth "Freakin" Rollins and SmackDown's AJ Styles faced each other to become the inaugural World Heavyweight Champion for the Raw brand.

On the April 24 episode of Raw, WWE Chief Content Officer Paul "Triple H" Levesque unveiled a new World Heavyweight Championship for the brand that did not draft Undisputed WWE Universal Champion Roman Reigns in the 2023 WWE Draft and that the inaugural champion would be crowned at Night of Champions. During the draft, Reigns was drafted to SmackDown, thus making the World Heavyweight Championship exclusive to Raw. To crown the new champion, a tournament was scheduled including wrestlers from both brands with a bracket for each brand. (Note: According to wrestling journalist Dave Meltzer, the reason that SmackDown wrestlers were included in the tournament was due to WWE's attempt to retain viewership for the May 12 episode of SmackDown, as it and other wrestling programs that week were going head-to-head with the 2023 NBA playoffs.) The first round and semifinals for each bracket were scheduled for the May 8 and May 12 episodes of Raw and SmackDown, respectively. The first round matches for each episode consisted of two triple threat matches with the respective winners advancing to the semifinals in a singles match the same night, with those respective winners advancing to the championship match at Night of Champions. The 12 tournament participants were revealed on May 7 on WWE's YouTube channel. Raw's bracket was won by Seth "Freakin" Rollins, while SmackDown's bracket was won by AJ Styles, thus scheduling Rollins to face Styles in the tournament final for the World Heavyweight Championship at Night of Champions.

At Backlash, Cody Rhodes defeated Brock Lesnar. On the following episode of Raw, Rhodes participated in the aforementioned tournament for the World Heavyweight Championship. During the first-round triple threat match that Rhodes competed in, Lesnar interfered and attacked Rhodes, costing him an opportunity at the title. Lesnar subsequently challenged Rhodes to another match at Night of Champions and Rhodes accepted. On the May 22 episode, Lesnar broke (kayfabe) Rhodes's arm. Although Triple H tried to dissuade him, Rhodes stated that he would still compete at Night of Champions.

In the main event of Night 1 of WrestleMania 39, Kevin Owens and Sami Zayn defeated The Usos (Jey Uso and Jimmy Uso) to win the Undisputed WWE Tag Team Championship, and retained them in a rematch on the April 28 episode of SmackDown. At Backlash, The Bloodline (The Usos and Solo Sikoa) competed in a six-man tag team match in which Owens and Zayn were opponents; Sikoa won the match for The Bloodline, although there was friction between Sikoa and The Usos. On the following SmackDown, Bloodline leader Roman Reigns praised Sikoa but expressed his disappointment in The Usos due to them losing their titles and the inability to regain them. The group's manager Paul Heyman then announced that he was able to procure another tag team championship match for The Bloodline; however, instead of The Usos, it would be Reigns and Sikoa challenging Owens and Zayn for the Undisputed WWE Tag Team Championship at Night of Champions. This in turn marked Zayn's first Saudi Arabian event since a WWE Live tour in April 2014 due to the relations between Saudi Arabia and Syria being restored after they had been suspended amidst the Syrian conflict that broke out in March 2011, which resulted in Zayn not working at any of WWE's Saudi Arabian events since. This additionally marked Owens's first WWE Saudi Arabian event since Greatest Royal Rumble in April 2018 as he had not worked any of the other events in support of Zayn.

On the May 15 episode of Raw, Mustafa Ali won a battle royal to become the number one contender for Gunther's Intercontinental Championship at Night of Champions.

On Night 2 of WrestleMania 39, Bianca Belair defeated Asuka to retain the Raw Women's Championship. During the 2023 draft, both were drafted to SmackDown. On the May 12 episode of SmackDown, during Belair's celebration on becoming the longest-reigning WWE women's champion of the modern era, Asuka, in her first appearance since WrestleMania, interrupted and shook Belair's hand, only for her to spit green mist on Belair, officially turning heel. On May 18, it was announced that Belair would defend the Raw Women's Championship against Asuka in a rematch at Night of Champions.

On the May 8 episode of Raw, SmackDown Women's Champion Rhea Ripley, who had been drafted to Raw in the 2023 WWE Draft, defeated Dana Brooke in a non-title match. Afterwards, Ripley continued attacking Brooke, prompting Natalya to come to Brooke's aid. The following week, Natalya stated that Ripley attacking an already defeated woman was disrespectful, with Ripley responding that Natalya only wanted to be relevant again, also stating that if Natalya interrupted her again, she would end her career. On the next episode, Ripley stated she would end Natalya's career at Night of Champions, thus a match between the two for the SmackDown Women's Championship was confirmed for the event.

On Night 1 of WrestleMania 39, Trish Stratus teamed with reigning WWE Women's Tag Team Champions Becky Lynch and Lita in a six-woman tag team match in which they were victorious. Stratus then teamed with Lynch on the April 10 episode of Raw to defend the title on behalf of an injured Lita, who had been attacked by an unknown person backstage. They lost the match and the title with Stratus taking the pin. Following the match, Stratus attacked Lynch, turning heel for the first time in 18 years after being a babyface since 2005. The following week, Stratus revealed herself as the mystery person who attacked Lita, ending their friendship, and then stated that she attacked Lynch and deliberately cost her the championship because Lynch believed that she was responsible for making the women's division relevant, with Stratus claiming that she was the one responsible. Stratus also stated that neither Lynch nor the fans said "thank you" for her impact on the women's division and she did not come back to be a sidekick or nostalgia act. After weeks of Stratus taunting Lynch, Lynch made her return on the May 8 episode, attacking Stratus. The following week, Lynch challenged Stratus to a match at Night of Champions, which was confirmed the following week.

== Event ==
Other on-screen personnel
Role:	Name:
English commentators	Michael Cole
English commentators	Corey Graves
Arabic commentators	Faisal Al-Mughaisib
Arabic commentators	Jude Aldajani
Ring announcer	Mike Rome
Referees	Danilo Anfibio
Referees	Jessika Carr
Referees	Dan Engler
Referees	Daphanie LaShaunn
Referees	Eddie Orengo
Referees	Ryan Tran
Interviewer	Byron Saxton
Pre-show panel	Kayla Braxton
Pre-show panel	Matt Camp
Pre-show panel	Peter Rosenberg

=== Preliminary matches ===
The PLE opened with the tournament final to crown the inaugural World Heavyweight Champion for Raw, contested between Raw's Seth "Freakin" Rollins and SmackDown's AJ Styles. During the match, Styles performed a Suplex on Rollins into the corner and a reverse DDT for a nearfall. Styles then performed a modified neckbreaker on Rollins. As Styles attempted a second rope Styles Clash, Rollins countered into a hurricanrana. Rollins then delivered a top rope reverse suplex into a reverse DDT on Styles. Styles then delivered a brainbuster to Rollins onto the ring apron. As Styles attempted the Phenomenal Forearm, Rollins moved out of the way and sent Styles to the outside, delivering a suicide dive and tweaking his own knee in the process. Styles then locked in the Calf Crusher, however, Rollins escaped. Styles then performed a Pele Kick and a Pedigree on Rollins for a nearfall. In the closing moments, Rollins performed a Superkick, a Pedigree, and a Curb Stomp on Styles to become the first-ever World Heavyweight Champion. Following the match, WWE chief content officer Triple H presented the title to Rollins. Rollins celebrated by standing on the middle ring rope as fireworks went off.

Next, Becky Lynch faced Trish Stratus. Lynch performed a Becksploder and Leg Drop on Stratus for a nearfall. Lynch performed Diamond Dust and a second Leg Drop for a nearfall. Lynch applied the Boston Crab on Stratus who reached the ring ropes to void the submission. Stratus performed a Chick Kick on Lynch for a nearfall. Lynch then applied the Dis-Arm-Her on Stratus who escaped. Lynch then attempted the Manhandle Slam on Stratus who placed her foot on the ring rope to void the pin. In the closing moments, Stratus rolled out of the ring, however, Lynch threw Stratus back into the ring. Zoey Stark then emerged from under the ring and performed the Z360 on Lynch, and Stratus then delivered a Stratusfaction on Lynch to win the match.

After that, Gunther defended the Intercontinental Championship against Mustafa Ali. During the match, as Gunther attempted a Top Rope Butterfly Suplex, Ali countered into a Sunset Powerbomb and performed the 450° for a nearfall. Ali then delivered a tornado DDT and attempted a second 450°, however, Gunther moved out the way and followed up with a Dropkick and a Powerbomb on Ali to retain the title.

In a backstage segment, Undisputed Tag Team Champions Kevin Owens and Sami Zayn spoke about their upcoming match against Roman Reigns and Solo Sikoa. Owens then stated that Reigns and Solo will lose this match, after which, Reigns will acknowledge Owens and Zayn instead.

In the fourth match, Bianca Belair defended the Raw Women's Championship against Asuka. In the opening stages, Asuka performed kicks to Belair's arm. Belair then delivered a spinebuster and a handspring moonsault. As Asuka attempted the Asuka Lock, Belair countered it into a pin for a nearfall. As the referee was attending to Belair, Asuka spit green mist at Belair, but she ducked. Asuka then spat the mist into her hand. As Belair attempted the Kiss of Death, Asuka rubbed her misted hand into Belair's eyes, and performed two roundhouse kicks to become the new Raw Women's Champion, ending Belair's record-setting reign at 420 days.

Next, Rhea Ripley (accompanied by her Judgment Day stablemate Dominik Mysterio) defended the SmackDown Women's Championship against Natalya. Utilizing distractions from Mysterio, Ripley beat up Natalya, sending her into the steel steps and bouncing her head into the announce table. Ripley then delivered the Riptide to retain the title.

In the penultimate match, Brock Lesnar faced Cody Rhodes in a singles match. Due to Lesnar breaking Rhodes' arm on the previous episode of Raw, his arm was equipped with a titanium-enforced cast, which he utilized heavily in his offense against Lesnar. In the opening portion, Lesnar dominated Rhodes, delivering three belly-to-belly suplexes. Rhodes then performed the Disaster Kick, the Cody Cutter, and two Cross Rhodes for a two count. Lesnar then applied the Kimura Lock, but Rhodes reached the ropes. As Lesnar attempted another F-5, Rhodes countered it into another Cross Rhodes for another nearfall. Lesnar then performed the F-5 on Rhodes for a nearfall. Lesnar then applied another Kimura Lock. Despite multiple attempts to reach the ropes, Rhodes passed out from the pain, giving Lesnar the win via technical submission.

=== Main event ===
In the main event, Kevin Owens and Sami Zayn defended the Undisputed WWE Tag Team Championship against The Bloodline (Roman Reigns and Solo Sikoa, accompanied by Paul Heyman). Zayn started the match with Sikoa, but was tagged by Reigns. Zayn then tagged in Owens, who performed a Stunner, but Reigns immediately performed a Spear. Zayn then performed a tope suicida to Sikoa, followed by a Blue Thunder Bomb for a nearfall. As Sikoa attempted the Samoan Spike, Zayn escaped and delivered an Exploder Suplex into the corner and hit the Helluva Kick, but Reigns broke up the pin. As Reigns attempted a Spear to Zayn, he dodged and Reigns unintentionally hit the referee. As Zayn attempted a Superman Punch, Reigns countered it with his own Superman Punch. With the referee down, Owens attempted a pop-up powerbomb on Reigns through the announce table, but The Usos (Jey Uso and Jimmy Uso) stopped him. The Usos then delivered multiple Superkicks to Zayn. As they attempted another superkick, they unintentionally hit Sikoa, which Reigns saw, infuriating him. After shoving both Usos around, Jimmy retaliated and delivered two Superkicks to Reigns, and, along with Jey, they retreated, allowing Owens and Zayn to perform a Stunner/Helluva Kick combination to Sikoa to retain the titles.

== Reception ==
The event received mostly positive reviews from critics, with the Undisputed WWE Tag Team Championship match and the ending that followed being deemed highlights of the night, while also praising the World Heavyweight Championship match.

Wrestling journalist Dave Meltzer rated the main event 4.5 stars, which was the highest rated match of the night. Bianca Belair vs. Asuka and Becky Lynch vs. Trish Stratus both received 3.25 stars, the lowest rated matches of the night. Gunther vs. Mustafa Ali was rated 3.75 stars, the World Heavyweight Championship match was rated 4.25 stars, and Cody Rhodes vs. Brock Lesnar was rated 4 stars. Rhea Ripley vs. Natalya was not rated.

== Aftermath ==
A Night of Champions event was not held in 2024, as WWE instead held King and Queen of the Ring that was originally planned for this 2023 date and location, but Night of Champions returned in 2025, also in Saudi Arabia, with the event becoming an annual PLE for the country, with it also subsequently hosting the finals of the King and Queen of the Ring tournaments. Additionally, on January 23, 2024, WWE announced that in January 2025, all of the WWE Network content would move to Netflix in most countries where the former was still available as a standalone service, making the 2023 event the final Night of Champions to livestream on the WWE Network in those areas.

=== Raw ===
New World Heavyweight Champion Seth "Freakin" Rollins opened the following episode of Raw to talk about his win at Night of Champions. Despite being a SmackDown wrestler, AJ Styles interrupted to congratulate Rollins. They were interrupted by The Judgment Day (Finn Bálor, Damian Priest, Dominik Mysterio, and Rhea Ripley). This led to a tag team match where Styles and Rollins defeated Priest and Bálor.

Also on Raw, Zoey Stark explained her alliance with Trish Stratus. Stark stated that she wanted to take the fast lane to the top of the women's division, but was then interrupted by Becky Lynch. Afterwards, Stark and Stratus laid out Lynch. After months of feuding, the rivalry ended at Payback, where Lynch defeated Stratus in a Steel Cage match after Stark betrayed Stratus.

Cody Rhodes talked about his loss to Brock Lesnar, stating that he did not give up and questioned if Lesnar was satisfied with that victory and them being tied 1–1. Rhodes then issued an open challenge to Lesnar for anytime. Lesnar then returned on the July 3 episode, and a short brawl broke out, with Rhodes standing tall. This eventually led to a third match between the two for SummerSlam.

On the June 12 episode of Raw, SmackDown Women's Champion Rhea Ripley was presented with a new championship belt and the title was renamed as the Women's World Championship. The following week, Natalya received a rematch against Ripley, but the match never occurred as Ripley attacked and laid out Natalya before the match could begin. Another rematch was scheduled for the July 3 episode, where Ripley retained.

=== SmackDown ===
The following episode of SmackDown saw a celebration for Roman Reigns's achievement of reaching 1,000 days as Universal Champion. During the festivity, Triple H presented Reigns with a new singular championship belt to represent the Undisputed WWE Universal Championship. The celebration was then interrupted by The Usos (Jey Uso and Jimmy Uso). Jimmy stated that he did what he did at Night of Champions to protect his family, specifically his brother Jey. Jimmy seemingly convinced Solo Sikoa to join them against Reigns, but this was a ruse as he turned on his brothers by attacking Jimmy, showing his loyalty to The Bloodline. The following week, Paul Heyman tried bribing Jey to remain loyal to The Bloodline and got Jey a match for the United States Championship that night. Jey lost the match after an interference from Sikoa, who tried helping Jey win, as well as Jimmy, who accidentally superkicked Jey when Sikoa dodged the attack. After the match, Jey shoved Jimmy and Heyman away before walking off. On the June 16 episode, after seemingly siding with Reigns, Jey exited The Bloodline by superkicking Reigns and helped Jimmy fend off Sikoa, ending The Usos' association with Reigns in the process. The next day, it was announced that The Usos would face Reigns and Sikoa in a "Bloodline Civil War" tag team match at Money in the Bank.

On the June 9 episode of SmackDown, a championship presentation was held for new Raw Women's Champion Asuka. WWE official Adam Pearce convinced Bianca Belair to stay backstage to not jeopardize her rematch. During the special occasion, Asuka was presented with a new championship belt and the title reverted to its original name of WWE Women's Championship. The presentation was interrupted by the returning Charlotte Flair in her first appearance since WrestleMania 39, who challenged Asuka to a match for the title. Asuka accepted, much to the dismay of Belair, who was supposed to get her rematch first, with Pearce stating he would resolve the situation. Belair became impatient with Pearce and took matters into her own hands by confronting Flair the following week, stating she would be the next challenger for the title, regardless of who won. On the June 23 episode, Pierce banned Belair from ringside during the title match between Asuka and Flair on the June 30 episode. The title match ended in a disqualification win for Asuka after Belair, who was seated at the front row during the match, attacked Asuka. After the match, Belair laid out both Asuka and Flair. A championship rematch between Asuka and Flair was then scheduled for the July 14 episode. The match ended in a disqualification win for Belair, but Asuka retained. On July 21, a triple threat match between the three for the title was scheduled for SummerSlam.

== Results ==
No.	Results	Stipulations	Times
1	Seth "Freakin" Rollins defeated AJ Styles by pinfall	Tournament final for the inaugural World Heavyweight Championship	20:40
2	Trish Stratus defeated Becky Lynch by pinfall	Singles match	14:50
3	Gunther (c) defeated Mustafa Ali by pinfall	Singles match for the WWE Intercontinental Championship	9:00
4	Asuka defeated Bianca Belair (c) by pinfall	Singles match for the WWE Raw Women's Championship	15:00
5	Rhea Ripley (c) (with Dominik Mysterio) defeated Natalya by pinfall	Singles match for the WWE SmackDown Women's Championship	1:10
6	Brock Lesnar defeated Cody Rhodes by technical submission	Singles match	9:40
7	Kevin Owens and Sami Zayn (c) defeated The Bloodline (Roman Reigns and Solo Sikoa) (with Paul Heyman) by pinfall	Tag team match for the Undisputed WWE Tag Team Championship (Note: The name "Undisputed WWE Tag Team Championship" referred to both the Raw Tag Team Championship and SmackDown Tag Team Championship being held and defended together, although both titles remained independently active.)	26:25
(c) / – the champion(s) heading into the match

=== World Heavyweight Championship Tournament ===
First Round; Raw; May 8, 2023; SmackDown; May 12, 2023
Damian Priest Shinsuke Nakamura	— 13:25
Seth Rollins	Pinfall
Raw
Cody Rhodes The Miz	— 9:30
Finn Bálor	Pinfall
Edge Rey Mysterio	16:00 —
AJ Styles	Pinfall
SmackDown
Bobby Lashley	Pinfall
Austin Theory Sheamus	13:00 —

Semifinals; Raw; May 8, 2023; SmackDown; May 12, 2023
Seth Rollins	Pinfall
Finn Bálor	13:30
AJ Styles	Pinfall
Bobby Lashley	12:00

Final; Night of Champions; May 27, 2023
Seth Rollins	Pinfall
AJ Styles	20:40
