= Crown Jewel (2021) =

WWE pay-per-view and livestreaming event

Crown Jewel جوهرة التاج (Arabic)
- Promotional poster featuring Roman Reigns, Brock Lesnar, and Paul Heyman
- Promotion: WWE
- Brand(s): Raw; SmackDown
- Date: October 21, 2021
- City: Riyadh, Saudi Arabia
- Venue: Mohammed Abdo Arena
- Attendance: 22,000

WWE event chronology
← Previous; Extreme Rules	Next → Survivor Series

WWE in Saudi Arabia chronology
← Previous; Super ShowDown	Next → Elimination Chamber

Crown Jewel chronology
← Previous; 2019	Next → 2022

King of the Ring & Queen's Crown tournament chronology
← Previous; King: 2019; Queen: First	Next → King & Queen: 2024

The 2021 Crown Jewel (Arabic: جوهرة التاج, romanized: jawharat altaaji) was a professional wrestling pay-per-view (PPV) and livestreaming event produced by the American company WWE, held for wrestlers from the promotion's main roster brands, Raw and SmackDown. It was the third Crown Jewel and took place on Thursday, October 21, 2021, at Mohammed Abdo Arena on The Boulevard in Riyadh, Saudi Arabia. The event was held as part of the city's annual Riyadh Season festivities and aired live at 7:00 p.m. Arabia Standard Time (12:00 p.m. Eastern Time). It also hosted the finals of both the 22nd King of the Ring tournament and the inaugural Queen's Crown tournament (renamed Queen of the Ring in 2024), with the last King of the Ring tournament held in 2019.

This was the sixth event that WWE held in Saudi Arabia under a 10-year partnership in support of Saudi Vision 2030. It would also be WWE's first event to be held outside the United States since the last Saudi Arabian event, Super ShowDown in February 2020, due to the COVID-19 pandemic, which suspended WWE's touring schedule, requiring all events between mid-March 2020 and mid-July 2021 to be held behind closed doors at venues in the U.S. state of Florida, with the exception of WrestleMania 37 in April 2021, although it was held at a reduced venue capacity before WWE resumed live touring with full capacity crowds in mid-July. As a result, this was the first Crown Jewel held since 2019, and it was also the first Crown Jewel to livestream on SonyLIV in India and Peacock in the United States following the shutdown of the Indian version of the WWE Network in February and the American version in April.

Ten matches were contested at the event, including one on the Kickoff pre-show. In the main event, Roman Reigns defeated Brock Lesnar to retain SmackDown's Universal Championship. In other prominent matches, Becky Lynch defeated Sasha Banks and Bianca Belair in a triple threat match to retain the SmackDown Women's Championship, Big E defeated Drew McIntyre to retain Raw's WWE Championship, Goldberg defeated Bobby Lashley in a No Holds Barred Falls Count Anywhere match, and in the opening bout, Edge defeated Seth Rollins in a Hell in a Cell match. Additionally, Raw's Xavier Woods defeated SmackDown's Finn Bálor to win the King of the Ring tournament, earning the title of "King of the Ring", while SmackDown's Zelina Vega defeated Raw's Doudrop to win the inaugural Queen's Crown tournament, earning the title of "Queen".

In contrast to WWE's earlier events held in Saudi Arabia, the 2021 Crown Jewel was met with positive reviews from critics, with much praise being directed to the Hell in a Cell match between Edge and Seth Rollins.

== Production ==
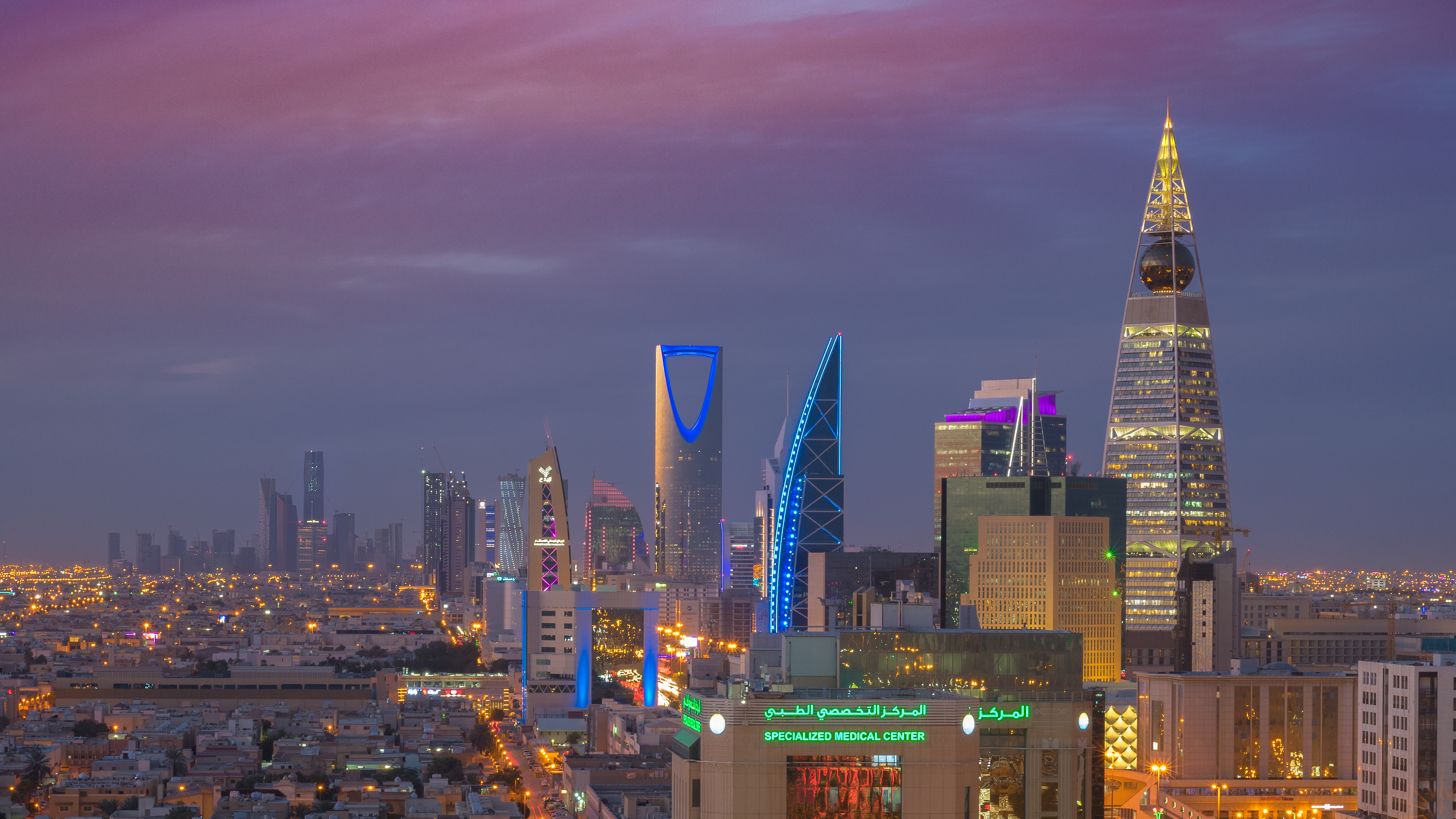
The third Crown Jewel was held at the Mohammed Abdo Arena on The Boulevard in Riyadh, Saudi Arabia (pictured).

=== Background ===
In early 2018, the American professional wrestling promotion WWE began a 10-year strategic multiplatform partnership with the Ministry of Sport (formerly General Sports Authority) in support of Saudi Vision 2030, Saudi Arabia's social and economic reform program. Crown Jewel was then established later that same year, subsequently becoming the main recurring event in this partnership, held in Riyadh, the capital of Saudi Arabia, in late October–early November, which became part of the city's annual Riyadh Season festivities that launched just prior to the 2019 event. As a result of the COVID-19 pandemic that began affecting the industry in mid-March 2020, WWE had to suspend its touring schedule and hold all of its events behind closed doors at venues in the U.S. state of Florida, with the exception of WrestleMania 37 in April 2021, although it was held at a reduced venue capacity. This resulted in the cancellation of a Crown Jewel event for 2020 due to pandemic-related travel restrictions.

After WWE resumed live touring in mid-July 2021, the company announced on August 16 that it would be returning to Saudi Arabia for the third Crown Jewel, and sixth overall event in the Saudi Arabian partnership, which would also be WWE's first pay-per-view (PPV) and livestreaming event to be held outside the United States since the last Saudi Arabian event, Super ShowDown in February 2020. The event was scheduled for Thursday, October 21, 2021, at Mohammed Abdo Arena on The Boulevard and featured wrestlers from the Raw and SmackDown brand divisions. The official theme song for the event was "Take My Breath" by The Weeknd.

=== Broadcast outlets ===
The event was broadcast on traditional PPV worldwide. It was also available to livestream on Peacock in the United States, SonyLIV in India, and the WWE Network everywhere else. This was the first Crown Jewel to livestream on SonyLIV and Peacock, following the shutdown of the Indian version of the WWE Network in February and the American version in April. With the event being held in Saudi Arabia, it aired live at 7:00 p.m. Arabia Standard Time (12:00 p.m. Eastern Time).

=== Storylines ===
The event comprised ten matches, including one on the Kickoff pre-show, that resulted from scripted storylines. Results were predetermined by WWE's writers on the Raw and SmackDown brands, while storylines were produced on WWE's weekly television shows, Monday Night Raw and Friday Night SmackDown.

After Roman Reigns retained the Universal Championship at SummerSlam, he was confronted by a returning Brock Lesnar in his first appearance since WrestleMania 36 in April 2020. On the September 10 episode of SmackDown, Lesnar again appeared to confront Reigns and claimed that his former advocate, Paul Heyman, who had been serving as Reigns's special counsel since August 2020, knew Lesnar would be present at SummerSlam in an attempt to cause dissension between Reigns and Heyman. Lesnar then challenged Heyman to accept a match against Reigns for the Universal Championship. Later that night, an irate Reigns accepted the challenge. On September 16, WWE announced that the match would occur at Crown Jewel, though not necessarily for the Universal Championship, as before Crown Jewel, Reigns had a scheduled title defense against "The Demon" Finn Bálor at Extreme Rules. Reigns retained at that event, thus officially making his match against Lesnar at Crown Jewel for the Universal Championship.

At SummerSlam, Bianca Belair was scheduled to defend the SmackDown Women's Championship against Sasha Banks, however, before the match began, it was announced that Banks could not appear for unknown reasons. Becky Lynch then made a surprise return in her first appearance since the Raw after Money in the Bank in May 2020. Lynch challenged Belair, who accepted, and Lynch defeated her in 26 seconds to win the title. At Extreme Rules, Lynch defended the title against Belair, however, Banks ambushed both Belair and Lynch causing the match to end in a no contest. On October 1, a triple threat match between the three women for the SmackDown Women's Championship was scheduled for Crown Jewel. On that night's SmackDown, Banks and Belair had their one-on-one match, where Banks won after interference from Lynch.

At SummerSlam, Bobby Lashley defended the WWE Championship against WWE Hall of Famer Goldberg. Lashley was declared the winner after the referee called off the match due to Goldberg injuring his knee and rendering him unable to continue. Following the match, as Lashley continued to attack Goldberg, his 15-year-old son Gage came out and jumped on Lashley's back. Lashley then applied the Hurt Lock on Gage only to release him and flee due to Goldberg aiding his son. Goldberg was then off television due to his (kayfabe) injury while Lashley lost his championship to Big E. Goldberg returned on the October 4 episode of Raw and proclaimed that he would kill Lashley for what he did to his son. Lashley came out and stated that his attack on Gage was a misunderstanding, which Goldberg refused to believe. Lashley then stated he would face Goldberg at Crown Jewel on the condition that the match was a No Holds Barred match, which Goldberg gladly accepted. The day of the event, it was announced that the match would have an added stipulation of Falls Count Anywhere.

On the September 27 episode of Raw, after Big E retained the WWE Championship in a Steel Cage match, he was attacked by Drew McIntyre, who wanted a shot at the WWE Championship. The following week, after McIntyre and Big E's match, Big E accepted the challenge and the match was scheduled for Crown Jewel.

On the October 1 episode of SmackDown, WWE announced the return of the King of the Ring tournament, following the last tournament in 2019, as well as the establishment of a female counterpart called the Queen's Crown tournament. Both the 22nd King of the Ring and inaugural Queen's Crown tournaments, each consisting of eight wrestlers evenly divided between the Raw and SmackDown brands, began on the October 8 episode of SmackDown, with the finals of each being held at Crown Jewel.

At Money in the Bank, Seth Rollins cost Edge his match for the Universal Championship as Rollins felt he deserved to be in the title match, and that Edge cut in line ahead of him. This led to a match at SummerSlam that Edge won. Unsatisfied, Rollins challenged Edge to a rematch that occurred on the September 10 episode of SmackDown that Rollins won. Rollins was still unsatisfied, however, as he continued to taunt Edge over the next few weeks due to Edge not announcing his retirement. Rollins challenged Edge to appear on SmackDown and accept another rematch. On the October 1 episode, Edge appeared to confront Rollins, however, as Rollins thought that Edge would not appear, he instead went directly to Edge's house and proceeded to make himself at home. The following week on SmackDown, Edge attacked Rollins and challenged him to a Hell in a Cell match, which was scheduled for Crown Jewel.

At SummerSlam, RK-Bro (Randy Orton and Riddle) defeated AJ Styles and Omos to win the Raw Tag Team Championship. On October 4, a championship rematch between the two teams was scheduled for Crown Jewel.

On the October 11 episode of Raw, after Mustafa Ali and Mansoor won their match, Ali shoved Mansoor and said that he was sick of losing. A match between the two was subsequently scheduled for Crown Jewel.

== Event ==
Other on-screen personnel
Role:	Name:
English commentators	Michael Cole
English commentators	Corey Graves
English commentators	Byron Saxton
Arabic commentators	Faisal Almughaisib
Arabic commentators	Jude Aldajani
Ring announcer	Greg Hamilton
Referees	Jessika Carr
Referees	Dan Engler
Referees	Eddie Orengo
Referees	Chad Patton
Referees	Charles Robinson
Interviewer	Kevin Patrick
Pre-show panel	Kayla Braxton
Pre-show panel	Matt Camp
Pre-show panel	Peter Rosenberg

=== Pre-show ===
During the Crown Jewel Kickoff pre-show, SmackDown Tag Team Champions The Usos (Jey Uso and Jimmy Uso) fought the newly reformed Hurt Business (Cedric Alexander and Shelton Benjamin) in a non-title tag team match. In the end, Jimmy performed an Uso Splash on Alexander to win the match.

=== Preliminary matches ===
The actual event opened with Edge facing Seth Rollins in a Hell in a Cell match. At the start, Edge started to attack Rollins in corner with right hands, but Rollins reversed and then did it himself, but Edge reversed and did it a second time. Throughout the match, the two used various weapons, including a steel pipe, steel chair, a ladder, tables, and the steel steps. One notable moment included Rollins performing a sunset bomb from the top of the ladder on Edge through a table, but it resulted in a nearfall. Towards the end, Rollins placed Edge's head onto a chair and attempted a Stomp, however, Edge countered. Edge performed multiple superkicks of his own on Rollins. Edge untangled the chain around Rollins' foot and applied the Crossface on Rollins using a steel pipe. In the end, Edge performed a Stomp of his own on Rollins onto a chair to pin him and win the match.

Next, Mansoor faced Mustafa Ali. During the match, Mansoor performed a Moonsault on Ali, however, Ali countered into a submission on Mansoor, who reached the ropes to break the submission. In the end, Mansoor performed a neckbreaker on Ali to win the match. Following the match, as Ali attacked Mansoor, he was confronted by karateka Tareg Hamedi, who kicked Ali in the head. Hamedi and Mansoor then celebrated with the crowd.

After that, RK-Bro (Randy Orton and Riddle) defended the Raw Tag Team Championship against AJ Styles and Omos. In the end, Orton countered a Phenomenal Forearm attempt into an RKO on Styles followed by Riddle performing the Floating Bro on Styles to retain the titles.

In the fourth match, Raw's Doudrop faced SmackDown's Zelina Vega in the final of the inaugural Queen's Crown tournament. In the end, Vega performed a Code Red on Doudrop to win the match and the tournament, becoming the inaugural Queen.

Next, Goldberg faced Bobby Lashley in a No Holds Barred Falls Count Anywhere match. During the match, Lashley dominated Goldberg and targeted Goldberg's leg by placing it in a chair and stomping on it. As Lashley attempted a spear on Goldberg, Goldberg moved out of the way and Lashley crashed through a table positioned in the corner of the ring. Goldberg performed a Jackhammer on Lashley, but instead of pinning Lashley, Goldberg decided he was not finished. Outside the ring, Goldberg performed a spear on Lashley into the timekeepers' area. Goldberg attempted to attack Lashley using the steel steps, however, Lashley moved out of the way. Goldberg followed Lashley to the entrance stage where Goldberg made quick work of Cedric Alexander and Shelton Benjamin. In the end, Goldberg performed a spear on Lashley off the entrance stage and through tables positioned by the stage and pinned him to win the match.

After that, Raw's Xavier Woods faced SmackDown's Finn Bálor in final of the 22nd King of the Ring tournament. During the match, as Woods attempted a Tornado DDT in Bálor, Bálor countered into a Double Stomp to the chest of Woods. Woods performed a Superkick on Bálor for a nearfall. Woods performed a Superplex on Bálor for a nearfall. As Woods performed the Tightrope Walk Diving Elbow, Bálor raised his knees to counter. In the end, Woods performed a Diving Elbow Drop on Bálor to become the King of the Ring.

Following this, Big E defended the WWE Championship against Drew McIntyre. McIntyre performed a Spinebuster on Big E for a nearfall. Big E performed three Belly-to-Belly Suplexes on McIntyre. Big E performed the Warrior Splash on McIntyre for a nearfall. As Big E attempted the Big Ending, McIntyre countered with a Michinoku Driver for a nearfall. McIntyre performed a Glasgow Kiss and a Future Shock DDT on Big E for a nearfall. Big E performed the Big Ending on McIntyre for a nearfall. McIntyre then performed the Claymore Kick on Big E for a nearfall. As McIntyre went for a second Claymore, Big E avoided and performed a second Big Ending on McIntyre to retain the title.

In the penultimate match, Becky Lynch defended the SmackDown Women's Championship against Bianca Belair and Sasha Banks. During the match, Belair did a one-handed press slam on Banks. Later, Banks applied the Bank Statement and Lynch applied the Dis-arm-her on Belair at the same time. As Banks applied the Bank Statement on Lynch, Belair broke it up with a handspring splash. Lynch performed a Manhandle Slam on Banks, but Belair broke up the pin. Lynch applied the Dis-arm-her on Banks and Belair at the same time, but Belair lifted both Banks and Lynch up. In the closing moments, Belair performed the Kiss of Death on Lynch, but Banks threw Belair out of the ring. After Banks returned to the ring, Lynch caught Banks with an inside cradle while holding the ropes for leverage to retain the title.

=== Main event ===
In the main event, Roman Reigns (accompanied by Paul Heyman) defended the Universal Championship against Brock Lesnar. During the early half of the match, Lesnar constantly tried to perform a Suplex on Reigns, however, Reigns held the top rope. Lesnar eventually performed multiple German Suplexes and an F-5 on Reigns for a nearfall. As Lesnar attempted a second F-5, Reigns countered into a Guillotine Choke who fought out with a Spinebuster. In the climax, Lesnar performed an F-5 on Reigns, who fell onto the referee, incapacitating him. Heyman then tossed the title in the middle of the ring, between both wrestlers, although it was unclear as towards whom Heyman intended to throw the title. This led to Reigns and Lesnar engaging into a tug-of-war with the title. Although Lesnar gained control of the title, The Usos came out and attacked Lesnar with a Double Superkick. Reigns then struck Lesnar over the head with the title. A second referee then came out and Reigns pinned Lesnar to retain the title.

== Reception ==
The 2021 Crown Jewel received generally positive reviews from fans and critics alike. The Hell in a Cell match between Edge and Seth Rollins was widely praised, with Brent Brookhouse of CBS Sports saying it stole the show, John Canton from TJR Wrestling graded the match 5 stars out of 5. and Chris Mueller of Bleacher Report calling it match of the night. Additionally, Mueller went on to praise the entire event, giving both the Hell in a Cell match and the triple threat match for the SmackDown Women's Championship a grade of A, while the only poorly received match was Doudrop vs. Zelina Vega, which they graded C+. WWE named the Hell in a Cell match the best match out of their top 25 matches in 2021, where it was ranked #1.

== Aftermath ==
The 2021 WWE Draft took place on the October 1 and 4 episodes of SmackDown and Raw, respectively; however, the roster changes did not go into effect until the October 22 episode of SmackDown, the night after Crown Jewel. This in turn meant that some rivalries, such as the one between WWE Champion Big E and Drew McIntyre, ended at Crown Jewel, as Big E remained on Raw while McIntyre went to SmackDown. Also, Becky Lynch, who was drafted to Raw and had retained the SmackDown Women's Championship at Crown Jewel, exchanged championships with Raw Women's Champion Charlotte Flair, who was drafted to SmackDown. This was done to keep the titles on their respective brands, with Lynch becoming the Raw Women's Champion and Flair becoming the SmackDown Women's Champion, making Flair a record 13-time women's champion.

The draft also impacted the King of the Ring and Queen's Crown tournaments as going into Crown Jewel, King of the Ring winner Xavier Woods had represented Raw but joined the SmackDown roster the following night, while Queen's Crown winner Zelina Vega had represented SmackDown, but moved to Raw. The next King of the Ring and Queen's Crown tournaments (renamed Queen of the Ring) were originally scheduled for 2023, but were delayed to 2024 for an event titled King and Queen of the Ring in Jeddah, Saudi Arabia, with both subsequently becoming annual tournaments but concluding at the Night of Champions event, which became an annual June event in Saudi Arabia beginning in 2025. Also beginning with the 2024 tournaments, the respective winners receive world championship matches at SummerSlam.

=== SmackDown ===
After Crown Jewel, it was reported that Brock Lesnar said he would be at the following night's SmackDown and would beat Roman Reigns senseless for what transpired at the event. Reigns opened SmackDown, and questioned Paul Heyman's allegiance before calling out Lesnar. After several minutes of taunting Lesnar, he finally came out and brawled with Reigns. The Usos attempted to save Reigns only for Lesnar to take them out, who continued attacking Reigns. WWE official Adam Pearce called for several members of SmackDown's roster, as well as security, to restrain Lesnar, who took out the majority of them. Lesnar then taunted Reigns and posed in the ring with the Universal Championship as Reigns retreated backstage. Following this, Pearce announced that Lesnar was suspended indefinitely for his actions. Lesnar responded by performing two F-5s on Pearce. In addition to the suspension, Pearce fined Lesnar $1 million. Lesnar's suspension was lifted a month later after paying his fine, and he returned on the December 3 episode where he convinced Sami Zayn, who had become the number one contender the previous week, to face Reigns for the title that night. WWE official Sonya Deville made it official and that the winner would defend the Universal Championship against Lesnar at Day 1. Just before the match, Lesnar attacked Zayn, which allowed Reigns to quickly defeat Zayn and retain the title, officially scheduling Reigns to defend the championship against Lesnar at Day 1.

Also on SmackDown, The New Day (Kofi Kingston and Xavier Woods) had a coronation for Woods's King of the Ring victory. Kingston introduced the 2021 King of the Ring winner, now adopting the name of King Woods, who was adorned with the crown, cape, and king's scepter. The following week, King Woods knighted Kingston as Sir Kofi Kingston, the Hand of the King.

Mansoor faced Mustafa Ali in a rematch which saw Mansoor defeat Ali once again.

=== Raw ===
On the following Raw, Becky Lynch boasted about becoming Raw Women's Champion again as well as for her victory at Crown Jewel. Bianca Belair, who was also drafted to Raw, interrupted and pointed out the fact that Lynch did not beat her at Crown Jewel, as Lynch had pinned Sasha Banks in the triple threat match. Belair also made the point that she had defeated former Raw Women's Champion Charlotte Flair the previous week and deserved a title match. A brawl ensued between the two. Following the brawl, Lynch stated that Belair would get a title shot, but not that night. The match was scheduled for the following week, where Lynch retained.

Also on Raw, a coronation was held for Zelina Vega, who won the inaugural Queen's Crown tournament. Now adopting the name of Queen Zelina, she was adorned with the crown, cape, and queen's scepter. Zelina then defeated Doudrop in a rematch.

== Results ==
No.	Results	Stipulations	Times
1^{P}	The Usos (Jey Uso and Jimmy Uso) defeated The Hurt Business (Cedric Alexander and Shelton Benjamin) by pinfall	Tag team match	10:40
2	Edge defeated Seth Rollins by pinfall	Hell in a Cell match	27:40
3	Mansoor defeated Mustafa Ali by pinfall	Singles match	10:00
4	RK-Bro (Randy Orton and Matt Riddle) (c) defeated AJ Styles and Omos by pinfall	Tag team match for the WWE Raw Tag Team Championship	8:40
5	Zelina Vega defeated Doudrop by pinfall	Queen's Crown tournament final	5:50
6	Goldberg defeated Bobby Lashley by pinfall	No Holds Barred Falls Count Anywhere match	11:25
7	Xavier Woods defeated Finn Bálor by pinfall	King of the Ring tournament final	9:40
8	Big E (c) defeated Drew McIntyre by pinfall	Singles match for the WWE Championship	13:25
9	Becky Lynch (c) defeated Bianca Belair and Sasha Banks by pinfall	Triple threat match for the WWE SmackDown Women's Championship	19:25
10	Roman Reigns (c) (with Paul Heyman) defeated Brock Lesnar by pinfall	Singles match for the WWE Universal Championship	12:20
(c) / – the champion(s) heading into the match; P / – the match was broadcast on the pre-show
