= King and Queen of the Ring (2024) =

WWE premium live event

King and Queen of the Ring ملك وملكة الحلبة (Arabic)
- Promotional poster featuring Logan Paul, Cody Rhodes, Sami Zayn, Becky Lynch, Jade Cargill, and Bianca Belair
- Promotion: WWE
- Brand(s): Raw; SmackDown
- Date: May 25, 2024
- City: Jeddah, Saudi Arabia
- Venue: Jeddah Superdome
- Attendance: 20,000

WWE event chronology
← Previous; Backlash	Next → NXT Battleground

King of the Ring event chronology
← Previous; 2015	Next → Final

King & Queen of the Ring tournament chronology
← Previous; King: 2021; Queen: 2021	Next → King & Queen: 2025

WWE in Saudi Arabia chronology
← Previous; Crown Jewel	Next → Crown Jewel

King and Queen of the Ring (Arabic: ملك وملكة الحلبة, romanized: Malik wa Malikat Al-Halaba) was a 2024 professional wrestling premium live event (PLE) produced by the American company WWE, held for wrestlers from the promotion's main roster brands, Raw and SmackDown. It was the 12th King of the Ring event, but under a new name, and took place on Saturday, May 25, 2024, at the Jeddah Super Dome in Jeddah, Saudi Arabia, airing live at 7:00 p.m. Arabia Standard Time (12:00 p.m. Eastern Time). The event hosted the finals of both the 23rd King of the Ring tournament and second Queen of the Ring tournament, with the last tournaments for each held in 2021, and the winners of each received a world championship match of their respective brand at SummerSlam.

This was the 11th event that WWE held in Saudi Arabia under a 10-year partnership in support of Saudi Vision 2030, thus marking the first King of the Ring event held outside of the United States. The event was originally scheduled to be held at the same location in May 2023, but plans were changed and it was replaced by Night of Champions. This was the first King of the Ring event since 2015, which was livestreamed exclusively on the WWE Network, the first and only to livestream on Peacock in the United States, SonyLIV in India, Disney+ Hotstar in Indonesia, Disney+ in the Philippines, Binge in Australia, and Abema in Japan, the first to air on traditional pay-per-view since 2002, and the first dedicated event for the Queen of the Ring tournament, which was originally established in 2021 as the Queen's Crown tournament. This was also only the second time that the men's tournament winner received a world championship match, after 2002, and the first time ever for the women. The event would go on hiatus again as the respective tournament finals have since been held annually at Night of Champions with a world championship match at SummerSlam becoming a permanent reward.

Six matches were contested at the event, including one on the Countdown to King and Queen of the Ring pre-show. In the main event, Cody Rhodes defeated Logan Paul to retain SmackDown's Undisputed WWE Championship, while in the opening bout, Liv Morgan defeated Becky Lynch to win Raw's Women's World Championship. In the event's namesake tournament finals, Raw's Gunther defeated SmackDown's Randy Orton to win the King of the Ring tournament, earning the title of "King of the Ring" and a match for his brand's World Heavyweight Championship, while SmackDown's Nia Jax defeated Raw's Lyra Valkyria to win the Queen of the Ring tournament, earning the title of "Queen of the Ring" and a match for her brand's WWE Women's Championship.

== Production ==
The 12th King of the Ring event, which was the first titled as King and Queen of the Ring, was held at the Jeddah Superdome in Jeddah, Saudi Arabia (pictured).

=== Background ===
In early 2018, the American professional wrestling promotion WWE began a 10-year strategic multiplatform partnership with the Ministry of Sport (formerly General Sports Authority) in support of Saudi Vision 2030, Saudi Arabia's social and economic reform program. As part of this partnership, WWE had scheduled a premium live event (PLE) for May 2023 in Jeddah at the Jeddah Super Dome titled King and Queen of the Ring, which would have revived the King of the Ring event series but with a rebranding; however, these plans were scrapped with the event replaced by Night of Champions at the same venue. Fightful later reported that WWE did not have plans to reschedule King and Queen of the Ring for later that year, but that the event could possibly be used for a future Saudi Arabian show.

On April 7, 2024, during night two of WrestleMania XL, WWE announced plans to go ahead with the King and Queen of the Ring event in Saudi Arabia at the Jeddah Super Dome, thus marking the 12th King of the Ring event and 11th overall event in the Saudi Arabian partnership. It was scheduled to be held on Saturday, May 25, 2024. This marked the first King of the Ring event since 2015 and the first to be held outside of the United States. It was also confirmed that the May 24 episode of Friday Night SmackDown would take place in Saudi Arabia for the first time.

The King of the Ring event was originally primarily based around the King of the Ring tournament, a men's single-elimination tournament that was established by WWE in 1985 with the winner being crowned "King of the Ring". It was held annually until 1991, with the exception of 1990. These early tournaments were special non-televised house shows. From 1993 to 2002, the promotion produced the King of the Ring tournament as an annual self-titled pay-per-view (PPV) event every June. The PPV was discontinued after the 2002 event, but the tournament continued to be held periodically every few years at other PPV events or as part of WWE's weekly television programs. WWE then reinstated the event in 2015, but it was again discontinued with the tournament again being periodically held on WWE's other programs. With the event's revival and rebranding as King and Queen of the Ring in 2024, it saw the finals of the 23rd King of the Ring tournament and the second Queen of the Ring tournament (originally known as Queen's Crown), which had been established as the female counterpart in 2021 with the winner crowned "Queen of the Ring" (originally simply "Queen"), thus being the first dedicated event for the Queen of the Ring. The last King of the Ring tournament was also held in 2021.

=== Broadcast outlets ===
The PLE was broadcast on traditional PPV outlets worldwide. It was also available to livestream on Peacock in the United States, SonyLIV in India, Disney+ Hotstar in Indonesia, Disney+ in the Philippines, Binge in Australia, Abema in Japan, and the WWE Network everywhere else. With the event being held in Saudi Arabia, it aired live at 7:00 p.m. Arabia Standard Time (12:00 p.m. Eastern Time).

This was the first King of the Ring event to broadcast on traditional PPV since 2002, as the 2015 event was livestreamed exclusively on the WWE Network. This was also the first King of the Ring event to air on SonyLIV, Peacock, Disney+ Hotstar, Disney+, Binge, and Abema after those countries' respective versions of the WWE Network merged under those services in February 2021, April 2021, January 2022, November 2022, January 2023, and October 2023, respectively.

=== Storylines ===
The event comprised six matches, including one on the pre-show, that resulted from scripted storylines. Results were predetermined by WWE's writers on the Raw and SmackDown brands, while storylines were produced on WWE's weekly television shows, Monday Night Raw and Friday Night SmackDown.

On the April 22 episode of Raw, Gunther announced he would take part in the King of the Ring tournament, making him the first official participant. Later that same night, 2021 men's tournament winner Xavier Woods as well as Drew McIntyre announced their participation. On the May 3 episode of SmackDown, Carmelo Hayes, LA Knight, and Santos Escobar announced their participation. Both tournaments began on the May 6 episode of Raw, with three first round matches for each tournament being held on both Raw and then SmackDown on May 10, with the remaining four first round matches held during the WWE Live events on May 11 and 12 (WWE Live events are typically non-canon to the television product). Due to various medical reasons, some announced participants for the first round matches were replaced: Woods was replaced by his New Day tag team partner Kofi Kingston, McIntyre was replaced by Jey Uso, Asuka was replaced by her Damage CTRL stablemate Dakota Kai, Bobby Lashley was replaced by his Pride stablemate Angelo Dawkins, and 2021 women's tournament winner Zelina Vega was replaced by Maxxine Dupri. On May 23 during an appearance at the WWE Experience attraction in Saudi Arabia, WWE Chief Content Officer Paul "Triple H" Levesque announced that the winners of both tournaments would receive a match for the world championship of their respective brand at SummerSlam, marking only the second time the men's tournament rewarded an award other than the title of "King of the Ring", after 2002, and the first time for the women's tournament.

On the April 22 episode of Raw, Becky Lynch won a 14-woman Battle Royal by last eliminating Liv Morgan to win the vacant Women's World Championship. The following week, as Lynch was celebrating her victory, she was interrupted by Morgan and Nia Jax—the latter's last night as part of the Raw roster as she was drafted to SmackDown in the 2024 WWE Draft. A match between Morgan and Jax was then scheduled for later that night, where Morgan won, prompting Lynch to give Morgan a title match. The title match was subsequently scheduled for King and Queen of the Ring.

On the March 11 episode of Raw, Sami Zayn won a gauntlet match by last eliminating Chad Gable to become the number one contender for the Intercontinental Championship at WrestleMania XL. In the weeks leading up to event, Gable trained Zayn for his championship match, which he won. Because of Gable's help, Zayn gave him a title match. Before the match, however, Bronson Reed warned that he would go after the winner. Zayn defeated Gable to retain the title, but after the match, Gable attacked Zayn while celebrating with his family, turning heel in the process. Later, Gable explained that the reason he attacked Zayn was because he felt disrespected by Zayn after he brought the title to him while he was down in the corner of the ring, and also after seeing Zayn celebrating his win with his family, something that Gable was not able to do after he lost an Intercontinental Championship match back in September 2023. After being attacked by Reed, Zayn defended his title against him on the April 29 episode, which Zayn won by disqualification after Gable attacked him. The following week, Zayn attacked Gable during his match with Reed, causing another disqualification. Later that night, Zayn announced that he would defend his title against Gable and Reed in a triple threat match at King and Queen of the Ring, which was later made official.

After successfully defending the Undisputed WWE Championship at Backlash, Cody Rhodes appeared on the following SmackDown. After being introduced by SmackDown General Manager Nick Aldis, he announced that Rhodes's next opponent would be United States Champion Logan Paul, and a Champion vs. Champion match was scheduled for King and Queen of the Ring. On the following episode, during the contract signing for the match, the contract stated that both Rhodes's and Paul's titles would be on the line at the event. However, when Paul was about to sign the contract, he tore it up, before bringing out his own contract, which stated that only Rhodes's title would be on the line. After being mocked by Paul, Rhodes signed the contract, confirming that he would defend the Undisputed WWE Championship against Paul at the event.

On the May 10 episode of SmackDown, Bianca Belair defeated Candice LeRae to advance in the Queen of the Ring tournament despite interference from LeRae's tag team partner, Indi Hartwell. Two weeks later, Belair lost in the semifinals of the tournament, hurting her knee in the process. LeRae and Hartwell mocked Belair's injury backstage until her tag team partner, Jade Cargill, came to her defense. Cargill then said that she would talk to SmackDown General Manager Nick Aldis, and it then announced that Belair and Cargill would defend the WWE Women's Tag Team Championship against LeRae and Hartwell on the Countdown to King and Queen of the Ring pre-show.

== Event ==
Other on-screen personnel
Role:	Name:
English commentators	Michael Cole
English commentators	Corey Graves
Arabic commentators	Faisal Al-Mughaisib
Arabic commentators	Jude Al-Dajani
Ring announcer	Mike Rome
Ring announcer	Ibrahim Al Hajjaj (main event)
Referees	Shawn Bennett
Referees	Jessika Carr
Referees	Dan Engler
Referees	Daphanie LaShaunn
Referees	Ryan Tran
Interviewer	Byron Saxton
Pre-show panel	Kayla Braxton
Pre-show panel	Kevin Owens
Pre-show panel	Big E
Pre-show panel	Wade Barrett

=== Pre-show ===
On the Countdown to King and Queen of the Ring pre-show, Bianca Belair and Jade Cargill defended the WWE Women's Tag Team Championship against Candice LeRae and Indi Hartwell. In the end, Belair and Cargill performed the DDT/Wheelbarrow Suplex on LeRae to retain the title.

=== Preliminary matches ===
The actual PLE began with Becky Lynch defending the Women's World Championship against Liv Morgan. Morgan countered a Manhandle Slam attempt into a roll-up for a nearfall. While Lynch applied the Dis-arm-her, "Dirty" Dominik Mysterio showed up. Morgan countered a Manhandle Slam attempt into a Codebreaker for a nearfall. After Morgan performed a superplex, Mysterio brought a steel chair into the ring. While he was distracting the referee, Morgan performed a DDT on Lynch onto the chair and scored a successful pinfall following Oblivion to win the title.

The next match saw Sami Zayn defend the Intercontinental Championship against Bronson Reed and Chad Gable (accompanied by Otis). All three men had control of the match in different points. Otis interfered and Gable told him to finish off Zayn, but Otis hesitated. Otis then accidentally struck Gable with a clothesline and Zayn performed a Helluva Kick on Reed to retain the title.

In the fourth match, Raw's Lyra Valkyria faced SmackDown's Nia Jax in the Queen of the Ring tournament final. Jax performed a Samoan Drop on Valkyria for a nearfall. Valkyria performed a Tornado DDT on Jax for a nearfall. Jax performed a second Samoan Drop and attempted an Annihilator, but Valkyria performed a running dropkick for a nearfall. Valkyria attempted a sunset bomb, but Jax countered and performed the Annihilator to win the match, becoming the second "Queen of the Ring" and earning a match for her brand's WWE Women's Championship at SummerSlam.

In the penultimate match, Raw's Gunther faced SmackDown's Randy Orton in the King of the Ring tournament final. After both men countered and performed their finishing moves, Gunther performed a clothesline on Orton for a nearfall. Orton performed a powerslam and a draping DDT on Gunther. Gunther countered an RKO attempt and performed a splash on Orton for a nearfall. Gunther attempted the move again, but Orton moved out of the way and performed an RKO on Gunther, who rolled out of the ring. Orton performed a back bodydrop on Gunther onto the announce table twice, but Gunther beat the count back in the ring. Gunther performed a half crab on Orton, who made it to the ropes to break the hold. Orton performed an RKO, but Gunther countered into a pinning combination to win the match, becoming the 23rd "King of the Ring" and earning a match for his brand's World Heavyweight Championship at SummerSlam. Replays showed that Orton's shoulder was up during the pin attempt.

Before the main event, Triple H announced that Drew McIntyre was medically cleared and would face Damian Priest for the World Heavyweight Championship at Clash at the Castle.

=== Main event ===
In the main event, Cody Rhodes defended the Undisputed WWE Championship against Logan Paul. Late in the match, Paul performed a frog splash on Rhodes through an announce table before performing the same move in the ring for a nearfall. Paul attempted a splash, but Rhodes moved out of the way, leading to the referee being incapacitated. Rhodes performed the Vertebreaker, but with the referee knocked out, Paul struck Rhodes with a low blow. As Paul attempted to hit Rhodes with brass knuckles, ring announcer Ibrahim Al Hajjaj grabbed Paul's leg. Rhodes then performed three Cross Rhodes on Paul to retain the title. After the match, Rhodes thanked Hajjaj for the help and raised his arm.

== Aftermath ==
After the show, WWE Chief Content Officer Paul "Triple H" Levesque noted the mistake in the King of the Ring final but said the referee's decision was final. He also said that there would likely be a rematch between Gunther and Randy Orton. Because of his win, Gunther received a match for Raw's World Heavyweight Championship at SummerSlam, where he defeated Damian Priest to win the title. During Gunther's speech on the following Raw, he was interrupted by Orton, who noted that because of that mistake in the King of the Ring final, that ultimately allowed Gunther to become champion. He then said that he wanted his rematch at Bash in Berlin so he could take the World Heavyweight Championship from Gunther, who accepted the challenge. It was also stipulated that if Orton won the championship, he would be transferred to Raw while Gunther would be transferred to SmackDown.

Because of her win in the Queen of the Ring final, Nia Jax received a match for SmackDown's WWE Women's Championship at SummerSlam. Jax would go on to defeat Bayley at the event to win the championship.

On the following episode of Raw, after Otis lost a match, Chad Gable said he would discipline him. When Gable was about to hit Otis with a strap, he was interrupted by Intercontinental Champion Sami Zayn, who asked how long Alpha Academy would put up with Gable's humiliation. After more provocation, Zayn and Gable brawled, with the latter coming out on top. The following week, Zayn called out Gable, however, he sent the Alpha Academy with a letter from Gable, who challenged Zayn for another Intercontinental Championship match. Zayn accepted the challenge for Clash at the Castle.

A Steel Cage match between Liv Morgan and Becky Lynch for the Women's World Championship was scheduled for the following episode of Raw, where Morgan retained after another accidental interference from "Dirty" Dominik Mysterio. Afterwards, Lynch went on a hiatus from WWE, but returned at Night 2 of WrestleMania 41.

The King (and Queen) of the Ring event would again go on hiatus, but the respective tournaments have continued to be held annually at Night of Champions beginning in 2025 with a world championship match at SummerSlam becoming a permanent reward for the tournament winners.

== Results ==
No.	Results	Stipulations	Times
1^{P}	Bianca Belair and Jade Cargill (c) defeated Candice LeRae and Indi Hartwell by pinfall	Tag team match for the WWE Women's Tag Team Championship	8:05
2	Liv Morgan defeated Becky Lynch (c) by pinfall	Singles match for the Women's World Championship	16:25
3	Sami Zayn (c) defeated Chad Gable (with Otis) and Bronson Reed by pinfall	Triple threat match for the WWE Intercontinental Championship	13:40
4	Nia Jax (SmackDown) defeated Lyra Valkyria (Raw) by pinfall	Queen of the Ring tournament final Since Jax won, she was crowned "Queen of the Ring" and earned a match for her brand's WWE Women's Championship at SummerSlam. (Note: Had Valkyria won, she would have challenged for Raw's Women's World Championship at SummerSlam.)	9:40
5	Gunther (Raw) defeated Randy Orton (SmackDown) by pinfall	King of the Ring tournament final Since Gunther won, he was crowned "King of the Ring" and earned a match for his brand's World Heavyweight Championship at SummerSlam. (Note: Had Orton won, he would have challenged for SmackDown's Undisputed WWE Championship at SummerSlam.)	21:50
6	Cody Rhodes (c) defeated Logan Paul by pinfall	Singles match for the Undisputed WWE Championship	24:20
(c) / – the champion(s) heading into the match; P / – the match was broadcast on the pre-show

=== King of the Ring tournament ===
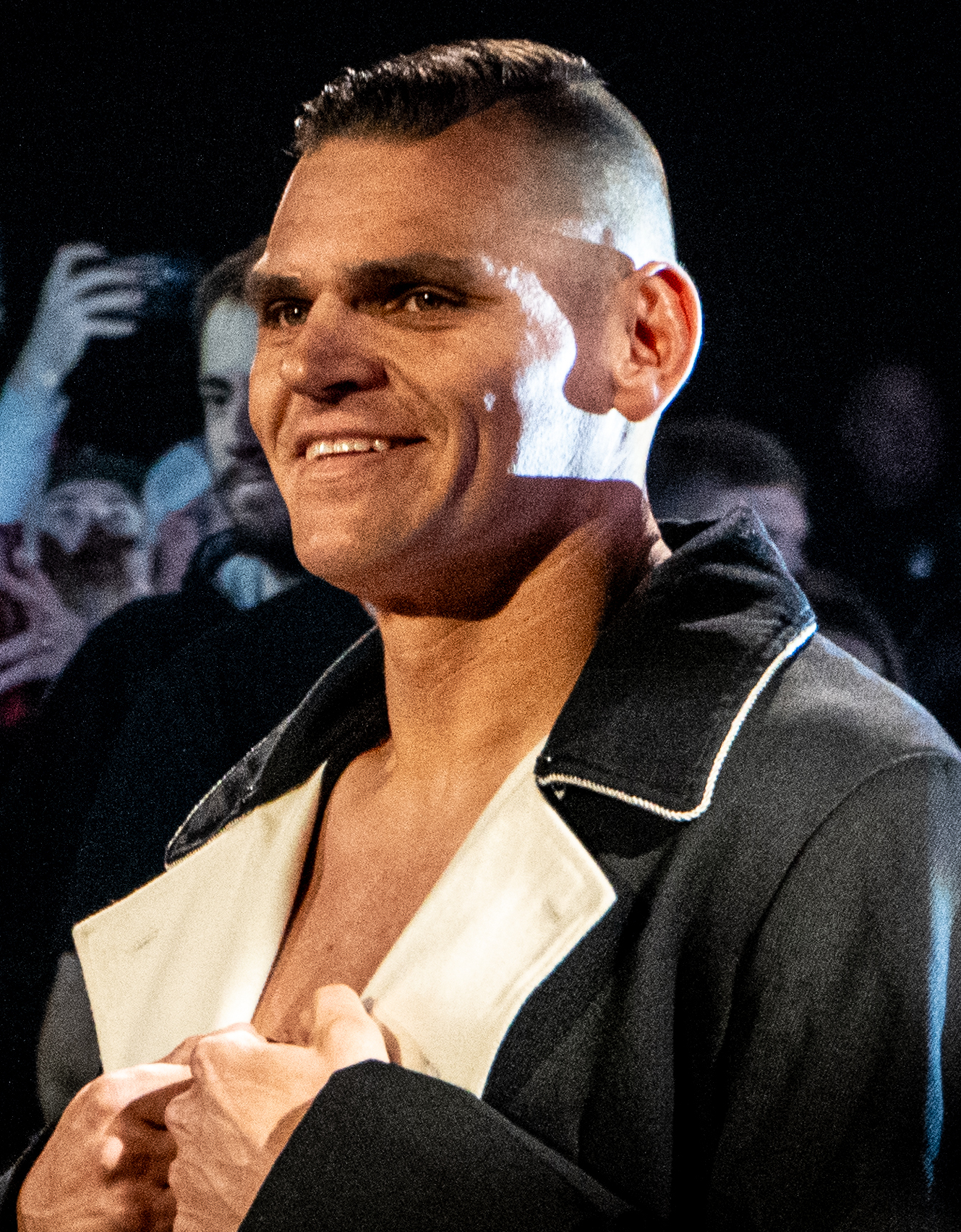
2024 King of the Ring winner Gunther.

First round (Raw, May 6) (SmackDown, May 10) (WWE Live, May 11–12)	Quarterfinals (Raw, May 13) (SmackDown, May 17)
Gunther	Sub
Sheamus	21:05
Gunther	Sub
Kofi Kingston	13:50
Kofi Kingston (Note: Originally scheduled to be Xavier Woods, but was pulled from the tournament due to not being medically cleared to compete.)	Pin
Rey Mysterio
Raw
Ricochet	14:00
Ilja Dragunov	Pin
Ilja Dragunov	13:15
Jey Uso	Pin
Jey Uso (Note: Originally scheduled to be Drew McIntyre, but was pulled from the tournament due to not being medically cleared to compete.)	Pin
Finn Bálor	13:35
AJ Styles	17:14
Randy Orton	Pin
Randy Orton	Pin
Carmelo Hayes	10:38
Baron Corbin	6:17
Carmelo Hayes	Pin
SmackDown
LA Knight	Pin
Santos Escobar
LA Knight	8:43
Tama Tonga	Pin
Angelo Dawkins (Note: Originally scheduled to be Bobby Lashley, but was pulled from the tournament due to not being medically cleared to compete.)	2:28
Tama Tonga	Pin

Semifinals (Raw, May 20) (SmackDown, May 24)
Gunther	Sub
Jey Uso	17:40
Randy Orton	Pin
Tama Tonga	13:58

Final (King and Queen of the Ring, May 25)
Gunther	Pin
Randy Orton	21:50

=== Queen of the Ring tournament ===
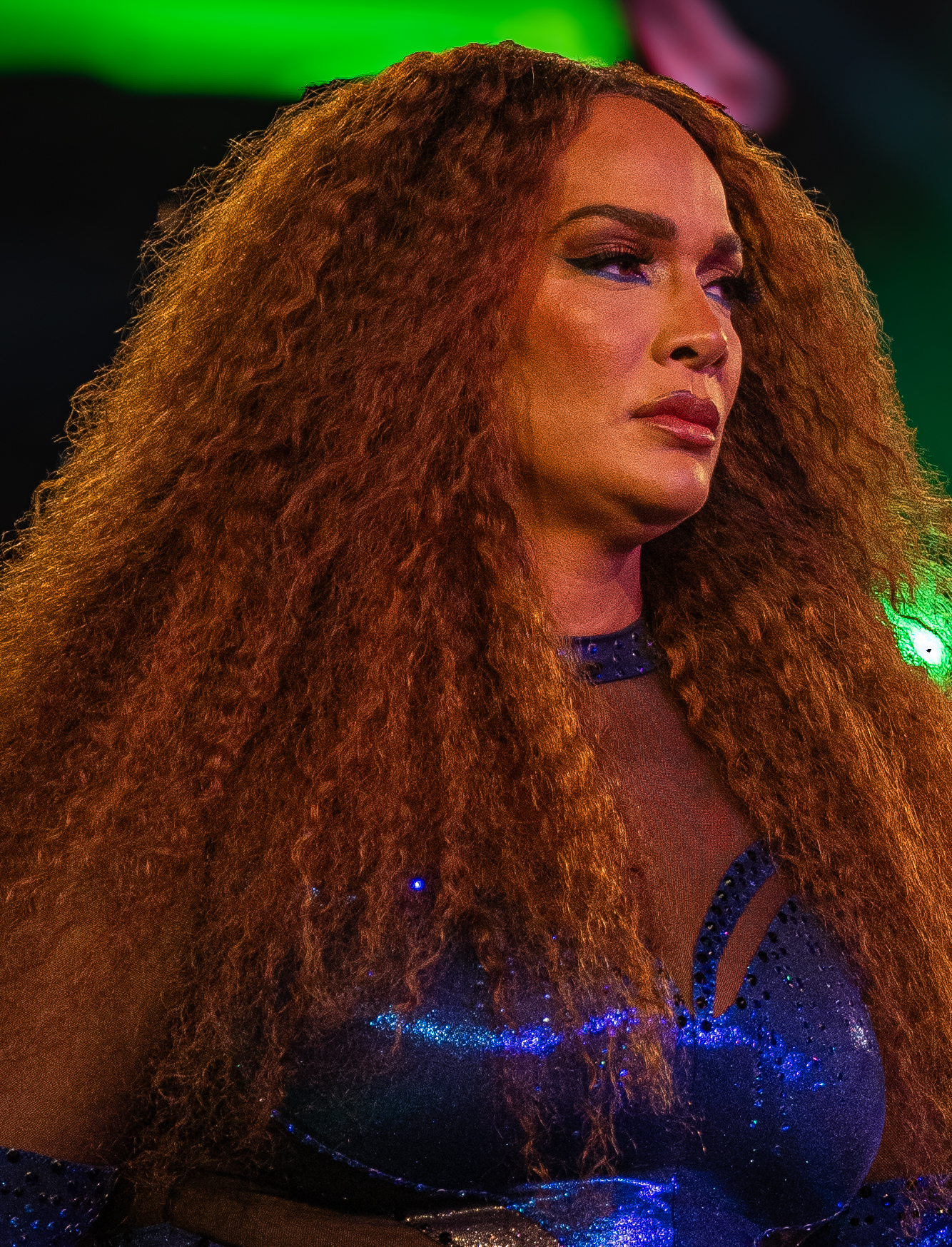
2024 Queen of the Ring winner Nia Jax.

First round (Raw, May 6) (SmackDown, May 10) (WWE Live, May 11–12)	Quarterfinals (Raw, May 13) (SmackDown, May 17)
Shayna Baszler	Sub
Maxxine Dupri (Note: Originally scheduled to be Zelina Vega, but was pulled from the tournament due to not being medically cleared to compete.)
Shayna Baszler	10:00
Iyo Sky	Pin
Iyo Sky	Pin
Natalya	10:20
Raw
Dakota Kai (Note: Originally scheduled to be Asuka, but was pulled from the tournament due to not being medically cleared to compete.)	8:50
Lyra Valkyria	Pin
Lyra Valkyria	Pin
Zoey Stark	9:00
Ivy Nile	5:20
Zoey Stark	Pin
Naomi	8:21
Nia Jax	Pin
Nia Jax	DQ
Jade Cargill	2:37
Jade Cargill	Pin
Piper Niven	5:23
SmackDown
Michin
Tiffany Stratton	Pin
Tiffany Stratton	13:28
Bianca Belair	Pin
Bianca Belair	Pin
Candice LeRae	2:48

Semifinals (Raw, May 20) (SmackDown, May 24)
Iyo Sky	19:15
Lyra Valkyria	Pin
Nia Jax	Pin
Bianca Belair	11:37

Final (King and Queen of the Ring, May 25)
Lyra Valkyria	9:40
Nia Jax	Pin
