= Jeddah Super Dome =

Multi-purpose venue in Jeddah

Jeddah Superdome
- Arabic: جدة سوبر دوم
- Interactive map of Jeddah Superdome
- Address: Jeddah; Saudi Arabia
- Coordinates: 21°44′54.7519″N 39°8′56.7128″E
- Elevation: 46 m (151 ft)
- Operator: Sela
- Capacity: 35,000–40,000

Construction
- Opened: 9 June 2021

The Jeddah Superdome (JSD; Arabic: جدة سوبر دوم, romanized: Jidda Sūbar Dūm) is a 40,000 seat multi-purpose event space located on Madinah Road, west of King Abdullah Sports City, Jeddah, Saudi Arabia. Since its opening in June 2021, it hosts all local and international exhibitions, conferences, and events in the city.

== Overview ==
With a diameter of 210 m (690 ft), height of 46 m (151 ft), and covered area of 34,636 m^{2} (372,820 sq ft), the JSD broke two building structure records: it is now the largest continuous (non-segmented, non-openable) dome, a record previously held by the Caesars Superdome, and the world’s largest geodesic dome.

== Events ==
- Notable Events

Event	Date
Jeddah International Motor Show	Unknown
WWE Elimination Chamber (2022)	February 19, 2022
Stan Lee's Super Con	Unknown
NEOM Exhibition	August 1–14, 2022
Rage on the Red Sea - Usyk vs. Joshua II	August 20, 2022
WWE Night of Champions (2023)	May 27, 2023
WWE SmackDown	May 24, 2024
WWE King and Queen of the Ring (2024)	May 25, 2024
Anthony Joshua vs. Kristian Prenga	July 25, 2026

== See also ==
- List of largest buildings
