= King and Queen of the Ring (2025) =

Professional wrestling tournaments by WWE

- King and Queen of the Ring logo
- Promotion: WWE
- Brand(s): Raw; SmackDown
- Date: June 9 – June 28, 2025

King & Queen of the Ring tournament chronology
← Previous; 2024	Next → 2026

King of the Ring
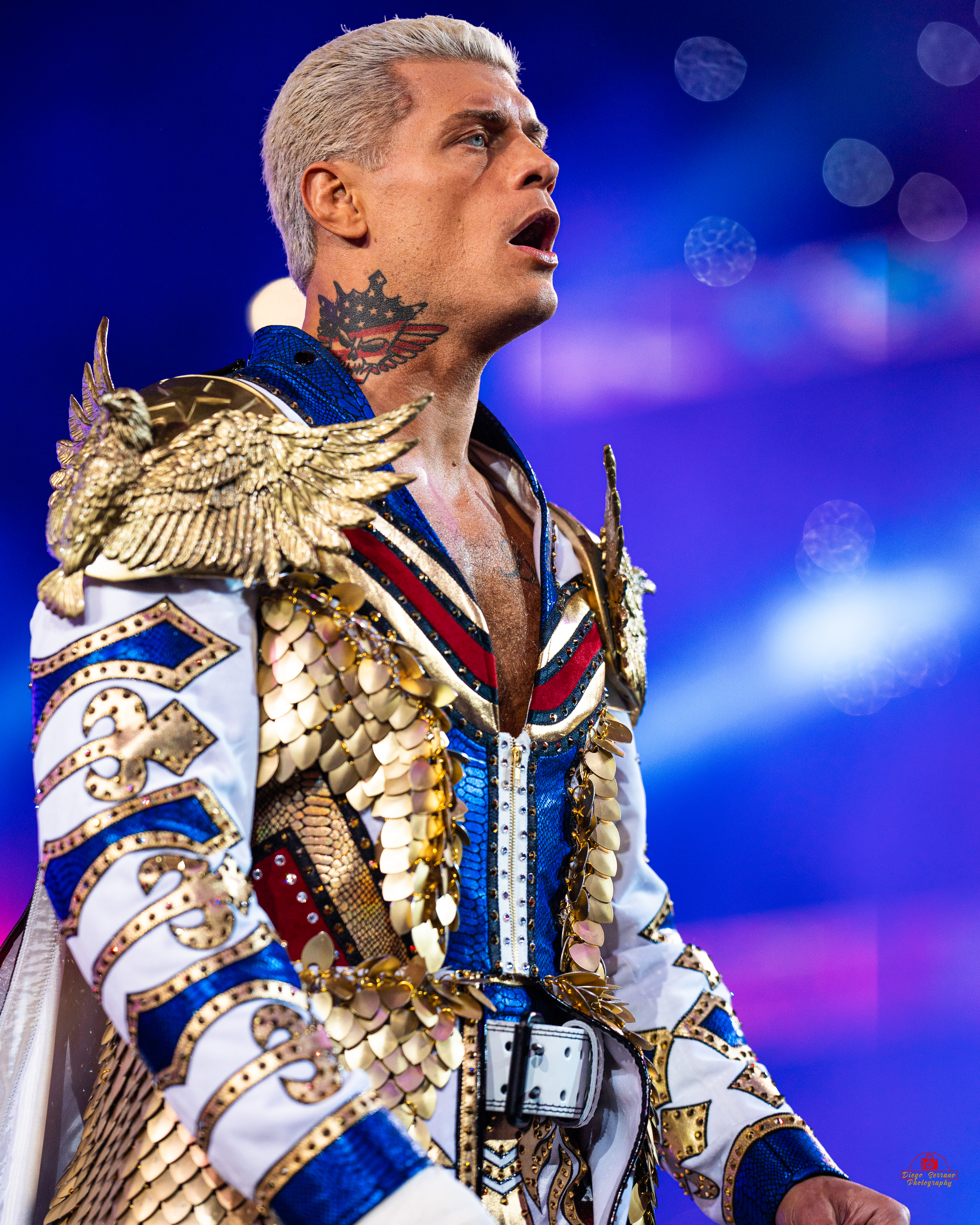
- 2025 King of the Ring winner Cody Rhodes

Tournament information
- Sport: Professional wrestling
- Location: United States Saudi Arabia
- Dates: June 9, 2025–June 28, 2025
- Tournament format: Single elimination tournament
- Participants: 16

Final positions
- Champion: Cody Rhodes
- Runner-up: Randy Orton

Tournament statistics
- Matches played: 7

Queen of the Ring
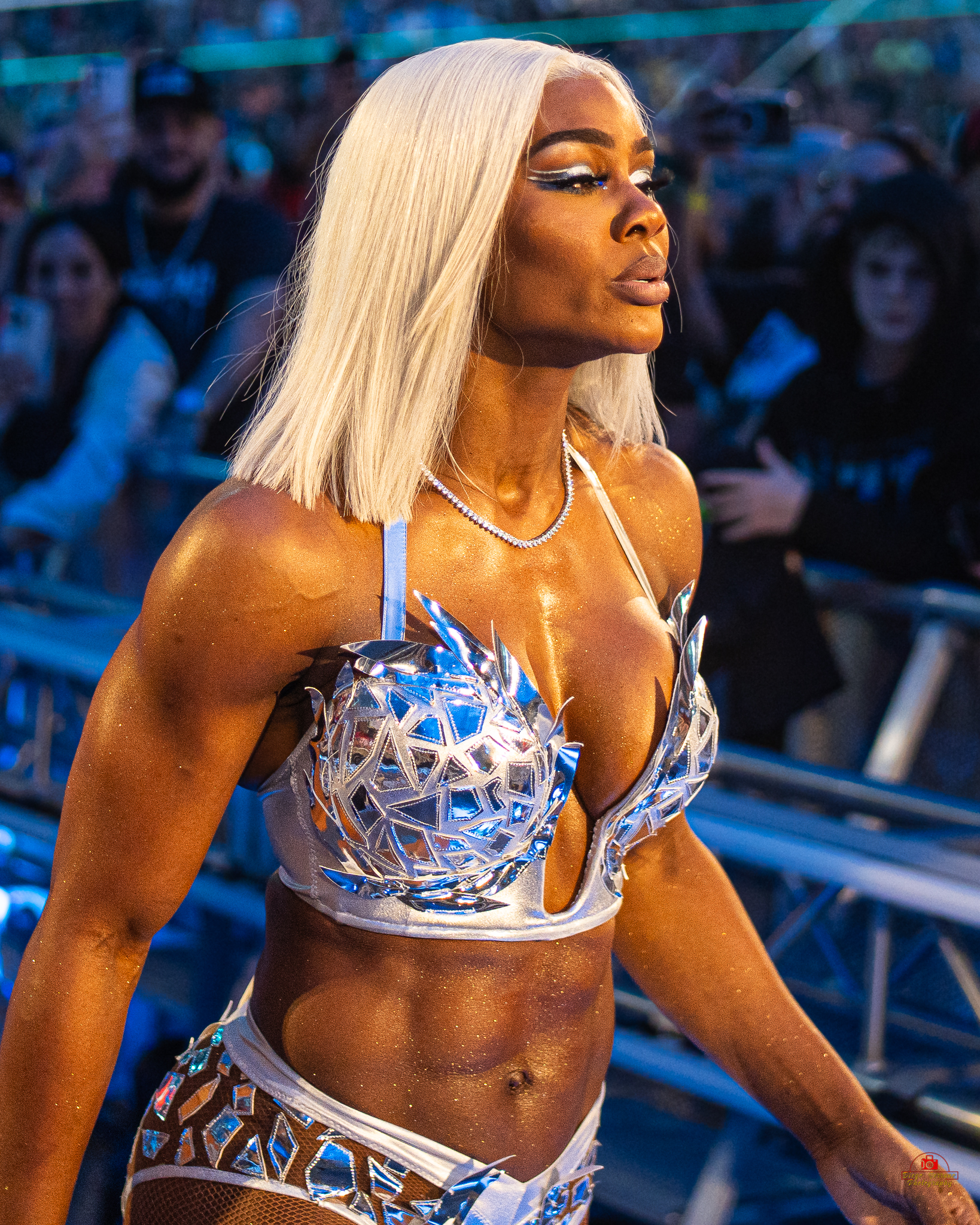
- 2025 Queen of the Ring winner Jade Cargill

Tournament information
- Sport: Professional wrestling
- Location: United States Saudi Arabia
- Dates: June 9, 2025–June 28, 2025
- Tournament format: Single elimination tournament
- Participants: 16

Final positions
- Champion: Jade Cargill
- Runner-up: Asuka

Tournament statistics
- Matches played: 7

The 2025 King and Queen of the Ring were men's and women's professional wrestling tournaments produced by the American company WWE. They were the 24th edition of the men's King of the Ring tournament and third edition of the women's Queen of the Ring tournament that took place from June 9 to June 28, 2025, each held between wrestlers from the Raw and SmackDown brand divisions. The respective winners were crowned "King of the Ring" and "Queen of the Ring" and received a world championship match of their respective brand at SummerSlam. In the King of the Ring final, held between two SmackDown wrestlers, Cody Rhodes defeated Randy Orton to earn a match for the Undisputed WWE Championship, while in the Queen of the Ring final, SmackDown's Jade Cargill defeated Raw's Asuka to earn a match for the WWE Women's Championship.

Tournament matches began on the June 9, 2025, episode of Raw and continued to be held across episodes of Raw and SmackDown. The respective tournaments concluded at the Night of Champions pay-per-view and livestreaming event in Jeddah, Saudi Arabia on June 28, 2025.

== Background ==
King and Queen of the Ring are respective men's and women's professional wrestling tournaments periodically held by the American company WWE. The King of the Ring tournament was established in 1985 with Queen of the Ring introduced in 2021 (originally as Queen's Crown; renamed in 2024). The respective winners are crowned the "King of the Ring" and "Queen of the Ring", and since 2024, they also receive a world championship match of their respective brand at SummerSlam. From 1993 to 2002 and in 2015, the King of the Ring finals took place at the King of the Ring event, while in 2024, both tournament finals took place at the King and Queen of the Ring event, which was held in Jeddah, Saudi Arabia. For all other years the tournaments were held, the finals took place at another event.

The 24th King of the Ring and third Queen of the Ring tournaments were announced during the June 6, 2025, episode of SmackDown, with tournament matches beginning on the June 9 episode of Raw and subsequently held across episodes of Raw and SmackDown. First round matches for each tournament consisted of four fatal four-way matches with eight wrestlers each from the Raw and SmackDown brands. The winners of those matches advanced to the semifinals and those subsequent winners advanced to the finals at the Night of Champions pay-per-view and livestreaming event on June 28, 2025, in Riyadh, Saudi Arabia. Unlike prior tournaments since 2019 where there were separate Raw and SmackDown brackets and the respective bracket winners faced each other in the final, the 2025 brackets were mixed, creating the possibility that the final could be between two wrestlers from the same brand (which did in fact happen for the men).

== Finals ==
The King of the Ring final was between two SmackDown wrestlers, thus guaranteeing that regardless of winner, their world championship match at SummerSlam would be for the Undisputed WWE Championship. In the final, Cody Rhodes defeated Randy Orton to become the 2025 King of the Ring.

In the Queen of the Ring final, SmackDown's Jade Cargill defeated Raw's Asuka to become the 2025 Queen of the Ring, thus earning a match for the WWE Women's Championship at SummerSlam. Had Asuka won, she would have challenged for the Women's World Championship at the event.

== Brackets ==
=== King of the Ring ===
†	Raw	‡	SmackDown

First round (Raw, June 9, June 16) (SmackDown, June 13)
Bron Breakker	–
Dominik Mysterio	17:05
Penta	–
Sami Zayn	Pin
Aleister Black	–
Carmelo Hayes	–
LA Knight	16:15
Randy Orton	Pin
Andrade	–
Cody Rhodes	Pin
Damian Priest	–
Shinsuke Nakamura	17:05
Bronson Reed	17:25
Jey Uso	Pin
Rusev	–
Sheamus	–

Semifinals (SmackDown, June 20) (Raw, June 23)
Sami Zayn	11:25
Randy Orton	Pin
Cody Rhodes	Pin
Jey Uso	20:00

Final (Night of Champions, June 28)
Randy Orton	19:45
Cody Rhodes	Pin

=== Queen of the Ring ===
First round (Raw, June 9, June 16) (SmackDown, June 13)
Kairi Sane	12:50
Liv Morgan	–
Rhea Ripley	–
Roxanne Perez	Pin
Jade Cargill	Pin
Michin	–
Nia Jax	–
Piper Niven	12:50
Alba Fyre (Note: Replaced her Green Regime stablemate, Chelsea Green, who (in kayfabe) could not make the show as she could not find the city where the show was taking place.)	–
Alexa Bliss	Pin
Candice LeRae	11:00
Charlotte Flair	–
Asuka	Pin
Ivy Nile	–
Raquel Rodriguez	15:50
Stephanie Vaquer	–

Semifinals (SmackDown, June 20) (Raw, June 23)
Roxanne Perez	11:20
Jade Cargill	Pin
Alexa Bliss	9:25
Asuka	Pin

Final (Night of Champions, June 28)
Jade Cargill	Pin
Asuka	8:35
