= Queen of the Ring tournament =

Recurring professional wrestling tournament by WWE

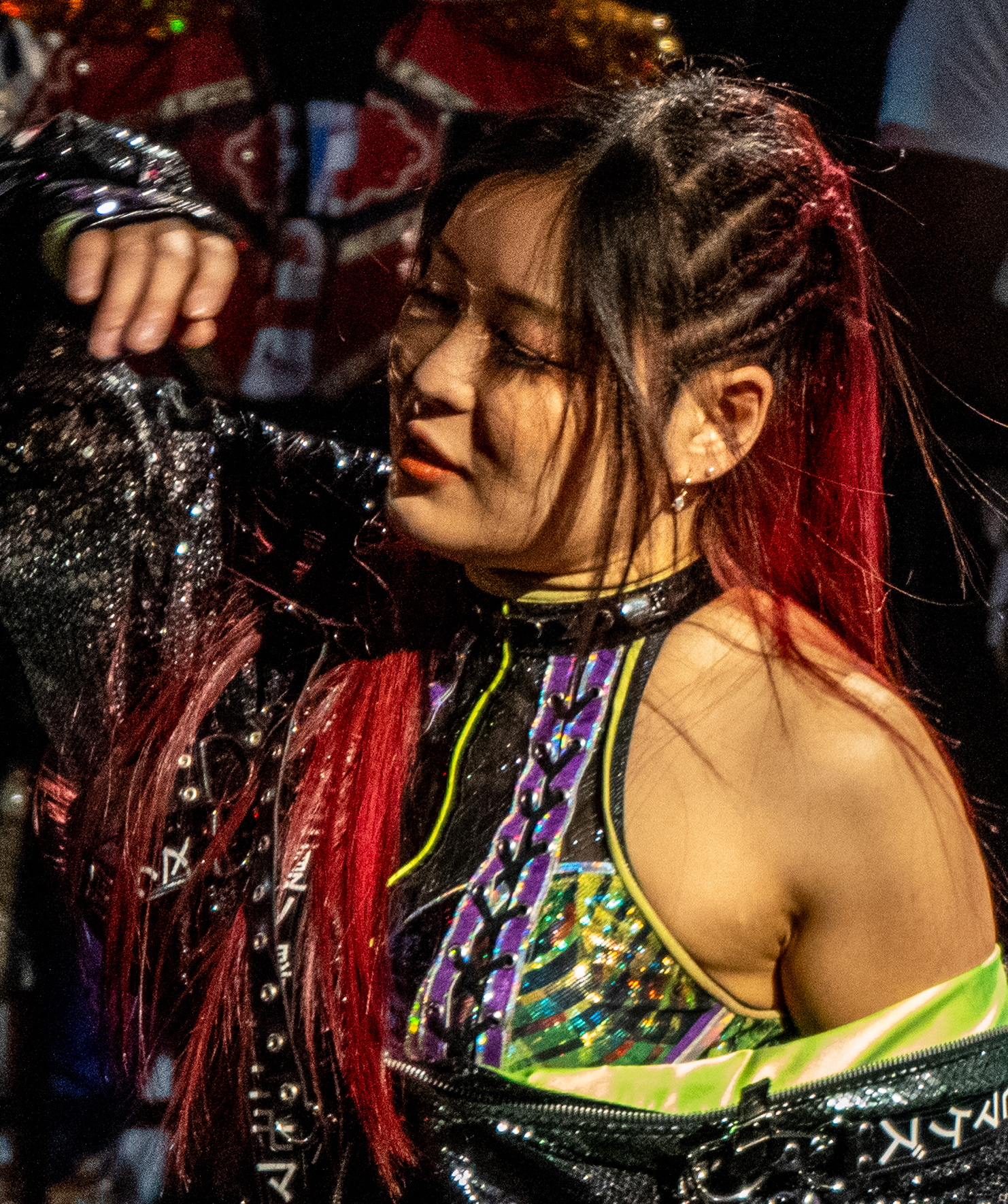
- 2026 Queen of the Ring Iyo Sky
- Promotion: WWE
- Former name: Queen's Crown

Tournament information
- Established: 2021; 5 years ago
- Current winner: Iyo Sky
- Last completed: 2026
- Prize: Women's world championship match at SummerSlam
- Editions: 4
- Format: Single-elimination tournament
- Participants: 16
Statistics
- First winner: Zelina Vega
- Oldest winner: Nia Jax (39 years, 362 days)
- Youngest winner: Zelina Vega (30 years, 298 days)

The Queen of the Ring tournament, originally known as the Queen's Crown, is a women's professional wrestling single-elimination tournament held periodically by WWE. Established in 2021, the winner of the inaugural tournament was Zelina Vega. The prize for winning the tournament is being crowned the "Queen of the Ring" (originally simply "Queen"), and beginning in 2024, a women's world championship match at SummerSlam. It is the female version of WWE's long-standing King of the Ring tournament for male wrestlers. The most recent 2026 tournament was won by Iyo Sky.

Like the King of the Ring tournament, female wrestlers from the Raw and SmackDown brand divisions participate. There were originally two tournament brackets, one for each brand, and the bracket winners faced off in the final. Since 2025, there have been two brackets, but mixed between the brands, which may result in the final being between two wrestlers from the same brand. (Note: In 2026, the finals for both the King and Queen of the Ring tournaments were entirely between wrestlers from Raw.)

The inaugural tournament was held in October 2021 and culminated at the Crown Jewel pay-per-view and livestreaming event. A dedicated event was to be held in 2023 in conjunction with the men's tournament, but it was cancelled; however, it was rescheduled for 2024 titled King and Queen of the Ring. Along with the tournament's return in 2024, it was renamed as "Queen of the Ring" with the winner earning that moniker to bring it in line with the men's tournament. The tournaments have been held annually since, but with the finals instead occurring at Night of Champions.

== History ==
In 1985, the American professional wrestling promotion WWE, at that time known as the World Wrestling Federation (WWF, renamed WWE in 2002), established the King of the Ring tournament as a men's single-elimination tournament, the winner of which is crowned the "King of the Ring". In 2016, the "Women's Evolution" began in WWE, where the promotion began to treat their female wrestlers on an equal level as the men. In the years following this, WWE introduced female versions of matches that were originally only contested by male wrestlers—such as the Royal Rumble match and Money in the Bank ladder match. In October 2021, WWE established a female counterpart to the King of the Ring tournament, called the Queen's Crown tournament, held between wrestlers from the Raw and SmackDown brand divisions. The inaugural tournament was announced to be held simultaneously with the 2021 King of the Ring tournament. The tournament began in October 2021, held across episodes of Raw and SmackDown, and culminated at the Crown Jewel pay-per-view and livestreaming event in Saudi Arabia. It was won by SmackDown's Zelina Vega, who defeated Raw's Doudrop.

In March 2023, WWE scheduled an event titled King and Queen of the Ring, which would have been a dedicated event for both the men's and women's tournaments, but on April 13, it was revealed that these plans were scrapped. Fightful later reported that WWE did not have plans to reschedule King and Queen of the Ring for later that year, but the event could possibly be used for a future Saudi Arabian show. In April 2024, WWE announced that they would hold the King and Queen of the Ring event in Saudi Arabia in May 2024. Tournament matches began on the May 6 episode of Raw, and were held across episodes of Raw, SmackDown, and at WWE Live events. Along with its return in 2024, the women's tournament and prize were both renamed as "Queen of the Ring". On May 23, WWE Chief Content Officer Paul "Triple H" Levesque announced that the winner of the 2024 Queen of the Ring tournament would also receive a women's world championship match of their respective brand at SummerSlam. The 2024 tournament was won by SmackDown's Nia Jax, who defeated Raw's Lyra Valkyria, with Jax receiving a match for the WWE Women's Championship.

During the June 6, 2025, episode of SmackDown, the third Queen of the Ring tournament, along with the 24th King of the Ring tournament, was announced to be held that month, culminating at the Night of Champions PPV and livestreaming event on June 28. Like with the 2024 tournament, the winner received a match for the world championship of their respective brand at SummerSlam. The 2025 tournament was won by SmackDown's Jade Cargill, who defeated Raw's Asuka, thus earning a match for the WWE Women's Championship.

The finals of the 2026 tournaments were again held at Night of Champions, but this time allowing the winners the choice of which world championship to challenge for at that year's SummerSlam. Despite holding Raw's Women's World Championship, Liv Morgan was entered into the tournament, explaining that she wanted to win the tournament and then go to SummerSlam and win SmackDown's WWE Women's Championship to become a double world champion. Morgan along with fellow Raw wrestler Iyo Sky made it to the final, where Sky defeated Morgan to win the tournament, who subsequently chose to challenge Morgan for the Women's World Championship at SummerSlam.

== Queen gimmick ==
Similar to the King of the Ring tournament, the prize for winning the Queen of the Ring tournament is earning the title of "Queen of the Ring"; it was originally simply "Queen" in 2021 when the tournament that year was called Queen's Crown. As several King of the Ring winners took on a king's gimmick with varying degrees of indulgence, inaugural women's winner Zelina Vega adopted a queen's gimmick and began to refer to herself as Queen Zelina. She began wearing a crown, a cape, and carrying a scepter, while speaking and acting in a regal manner, though acting more like a tyrannical queen due to Vega portraying a heel. After taking a brief hiatus in mid-2022, Vega returned in October and dropped the queen gimmick.

== 2021 tournament ==
Queen's Crown (2021)
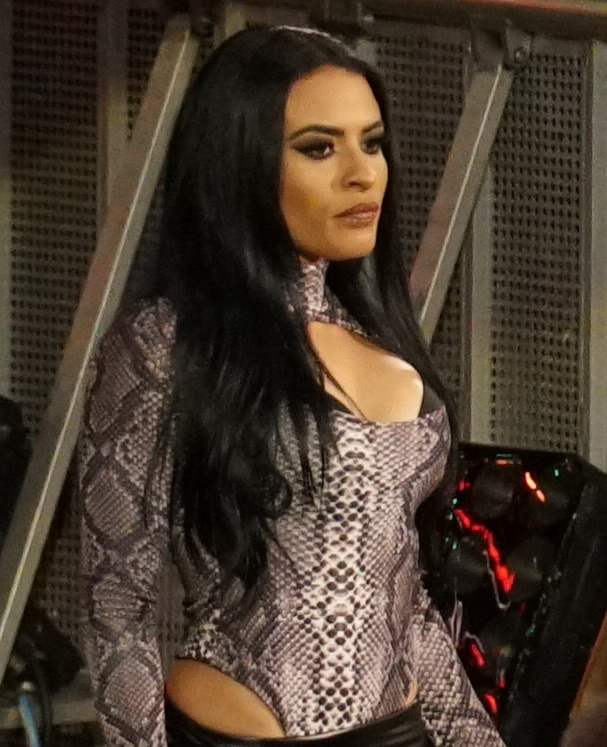
- The inaugural winner Zelina Vega, who became Queen Zelina

Tournament information
- Sport: Professional wrestling
- Location: United States Saudi Arabia
- Dates: October 8, 2021–October 21, 2021
- Tournament format: Single elimination tournament
- Participants: 8

Final positions
- Champion: Zelina Vega
- Runner-up: Doudrop

Tournament statistics
- Matches played: 7

The 2021 Queen's Crown was the inaugural edition of the Queen of the Ring tournament, and the only version to be called Queen's Crown. Consisting of eight female wrestlers, four each from the Raw and SmackDown brands, the tournament was divided into two brackets, one for each brand, and the winners of each bracket faced each other in the final. The inaugural tournament began on the October 8 episode of SmackDown and continued to be held across episodes of Raw and SmackDown. It concluded at the Crown Jewel pay-per-view and livestreaming event on October 21, 2021. In the final, SmackDown's Zelina Vega defeated Raw's Doudrop to become the inaugural winner.

=== Bracket ===
Quarterfinals; SmackDown (October 8); Raw (October 11)
Zelina Vega	Pin
Toni Storm	2:10
SmackDown
Liv Morgan	1:40
Carmella	Pin
Dana Brooke	1:25
Shayna Baszler	Pin
Raw
Doudrop	Pin
Natalya	3:00

Semifinals; SmackDown (October 15); Raw (October 18)
Zelina Vega	Pin
Carmella	2:40
Shayna Baszler	2:45
Doudrop	Pin

Final; Crown Jewel (October 21)
Zelina Vega	Pin
Doudrop	5:55

== List of winners ==
A women's world championship match at SummerSlam would become an additional permanent prize beginning in 2024, with the winners of the 2024 and 2025 tournaments specifically earning a match for the world championship of their respective brand at the event, while beginning in 2026, the winners have a choice of which world title to challenge for at SummerSlam.

†	Winner from Raw brand	‡	Winner from SmackDown brand

#	Year	Winner	Tournament final			Runner-up	Ref
#	Year	Winner	Event	Date	Location	Runner-up	Ref
1	2021	Zelina Vega	Crown Jewel	October 21, 2021	Riyadh, Saudi Arabia	Doudrop	
2	2024	Nia Jax	King and Queen of the Ring	May 25, 2024	Jeddah, Saudi Arabia	Lyra Valkyria	
3	2025	Jade Cargill	Night of Champions	June 28, 2025	Riyadh, Saudi Arabia	Asuka	
3	2026	Iyo Sky	Night of Champions	June 27, 2026	Riyadh, Saudi Arabia	Liv Morgan	

=== Queen of the Ring winner's championship opportunity ===
– Victory
– Loss

#	Winner	Brand	Event	Date	Championship	Result
1	Nia Jax	SmackDown	SummerSlam	August 3, 2024	WWE Women's Championship	Defeated Bayley.
2	Jade Cargill	SmackDown	SummerSlam; Night 1	August 2, 2025	WWE Women's Championship	Lost to Tiffany Stratton.
3	Iyo Sky	Raw	SummerSlam; Night 1	August 1, 2026	Women's World Championship	Lost to Liv Morgan.

== Reception ==
The original 2021 Queen's Crown tournament was heavily criticized by fans for not being on equal ground with the men's tournament that year. The length of the tournament's first six matches were a combined 13 minutes and 40 seconds, equaling an average of roughly two minutes and 15 seconds per match. This was in stark contrast to the first six matches of the 2021 King of the Ring tournament, where none were shorter than eight minutes.
