= Night of Champions (2025) =

WWE premium live event

Night of Champions ليلة الأبطال (Arabic)
- Promotional poster featuring John Cena
- Promotion: WWE
- Brand(s): Raw; SmackDown
- Date: June 28, 2025
- City: Riyadh, Saudi Arabia
- Venue: Kingdom Arena
- Tagline: The Last Time is Now

WWE event chronology
← Previous; Money in the Bank	Next → NXT The Great American Bash

Night of Champions chronology
← Previous; 2023	Next → 2026

King & Queen of the Ring tournament chronology
← Previous; 2024	Next → 2026

WWE in Saudi Arabia chronology
← Previous; Crown Jewel	Next → Royal Rumble

The 2025 Night of Champions (Arabic: ليلة الأبطال, romanized: Laylat al-Abtal), also promoted as Night of Champions: Riyadh, was a professional wrestling premium live event (PLE) produced by the American company WWE, held for wrestlers from the promotion's main roster brands, Raw and SmackDown. It was the 11th Night of Champions and took place on Saturday, June 28, 2025, at the Kingdom Arena in Riyadh, Saudi Arabia, airing live at 8:00 p.m. Arabia Standard Time (1:00 p.m. Eastern Time). Night of Champions is characterized by featuring championship matches; however, the 2025 event only had two, although two others were planned but were cancelled due to injuries. The event also hosted the finals of both the 24th King of the Ring and third Queen of the Ring tournaments; the last tournaments for each were held in 2024.

This was the 13th event that WWE held in Saudi Arabia under a 10-year partnership in support of Saudi Vision 2030, which also made it the second Night of Champions to take place in the country, after the 2023 event. Like many of WWE's events held in Saudi Arabia, it was sponsored by the country's General Entertainment Authority via Riyadh Season. This marked the first Night of Champions to air on Netflix in most international markets following the WWE Network's merger under the service in January 2025 in those areas, and it would also be the last on the WWE Network in any country as the last few countries that were still on the service due to pre-existing contracts merged under Netflix on April 1, 2026. It was also the final Night of Champions to air on Disney+ in the Philippines before it too merged under Netflix on January 1, 2026, as well as the last to air on Peacock in the United States as ESPN's direct-to-consumer streaming service assumed the streaming rights to WWE's main roster PLEs in the US beginning in September. This was also John Cena's final Night of Champions appearance and last appearance at a PLE in Saudi Arabia as an in-ring performer due to his retirement from professional wrestling at the end of 2025.

Six matches were contested at the event. In the main event, John Cena defeated CM Punk to retain SmackDown's Undisputed WWE Championship. In other prominent matches, SmackDown's Jade Cargill defeated Raw's Asuka to win the Queen of the Ring tournament, thus earning a match for the WWE Women's Championship at SummerSlam, and in the opening bout, Cody Rhodes defeated Randy Orton, both from SmackDown, to win the King of the Ring tournament, thus earning a match for the Undisputed WWE Championship, also at SummerSlam. The event marked the return of Tonga Loa in his first appearance after suffering an injury at Survivor Series: WarGames in November 2024, and the WWE televised debut of Hikuleo, whose ring name was changed to Talla Tonga.

== Production ==
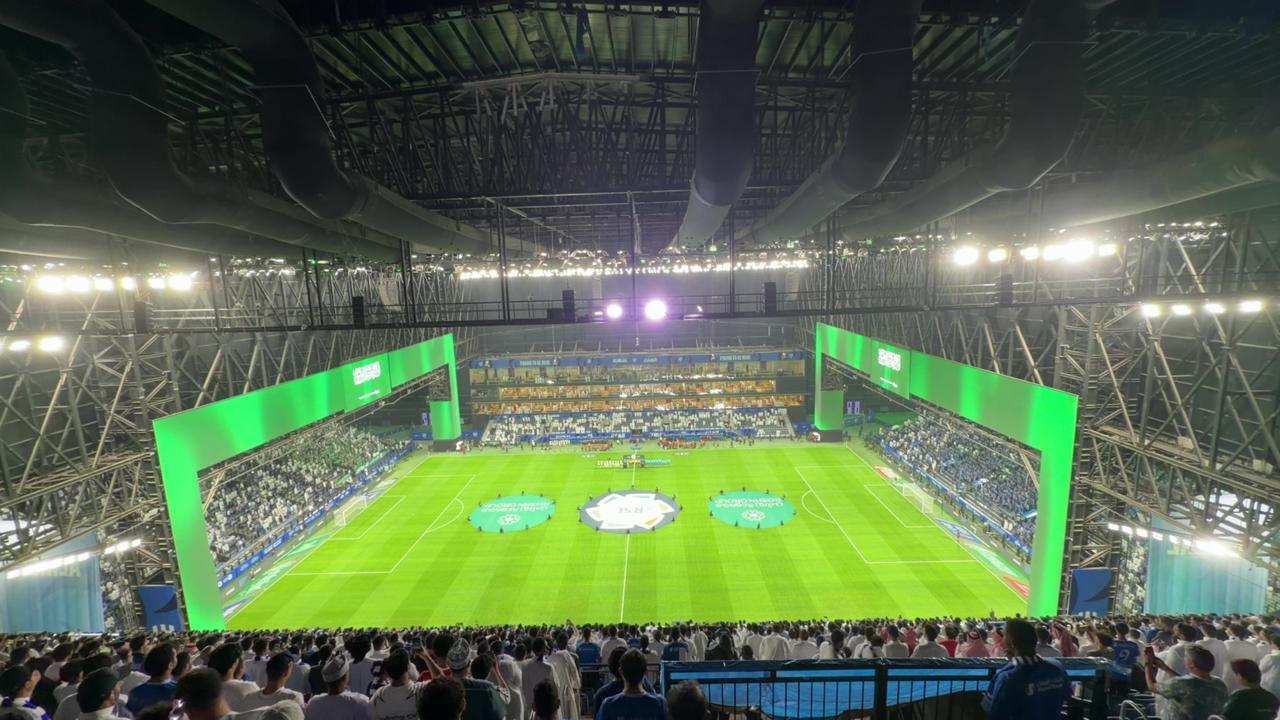
The 11th Night of Champions was held at the Kingdom Arena in Riyadh, Saudi Arabia, which was the second Night of Champions in the country, after 2023.

=== Background ===
Night of Champions is a professional wrestling premium live event (PLE) produced by the American company WWE, established in 2007. It was held annually until 2015 and originally aired via pay-per-view (PPV) before it also began simulcasting on WWE's livestreaming platforms in 2014. Night of Champions was discontinued after the 2015 event, but it was reinstated in 2023; however, an event was not held in 2024. The event is characterized by having championship matches. In early 2018, WWE began a 10-year strategic multiplatform partnership with the Ministry of Sport (formerly General Sports Authority) in support of Saudi Vision 2030, Saudi Arabia's social and economic reform program. The 2023 Night of Champions was the first Night of Champions held in Saudi Arabia, which was in Jeddah, and it was the ninth event under this partnership.

On May 10, 2025, WWE announced that the 11th Night of Champions would return the event to Saudi Arabia in Riyadh and would take place on Saturday, June 28, 2025, at the Kingdom Arena, featuring wrestlers from the Raw and SmackDown brand divisions. This was the 13th event that WWE held in Saudi Arabia, and WWE's only PLE in the country in 2025 due to 2026 hosting three such events; excluding from early 2020 to mid-2021 during the COVID-19 pandemic, Saudi Arabia had hosted two events per year since 2018. The June 27 episode of Friday Night SmackDown was also held at the same venue.

=== Broadcast outlets ===
The PLE was broadcast on traditional PPV outlets worldwide. It was also available to livestream on Peacock in the United States, SuperSport in Sub-Saharan Africa, Disney+ in the Philippines, Abema in Japan, Netflix in most other international markets, and the WWE Network in a select few countries that had not yet transferred to Netflix due to pre-existing contracts. This marked the first Night of Champions to livestream on Netflix following the WWE Network's merger under the service in January in those areas. With the event being held in Saudi Arabia, it aired live at 8:00 p.m. Arabia Standard Time (1:00 p.m. Eastern Time).

=== Storylines ===
The event included six matches that resulted from scripted storylines. Results were predetermined by WWE's writers on the Raw and SmackDown brands, while storylines were produced on WWE's weekly television shows, Monday Night Raw and Friday Night SmackDown.

During the June 6 episode of SmackDown, the tournaments for the 24th King of the Ring and third Queen of the Ring were announced to begin on the June 9 episode of Raw, subsequently held across episodes of Raw and SmackDown and culminating at Night of Champions with the winner of each tournament receiving a match for the world championship of their respective brand at SummerSlam. The semifinals took place on the June 20 and June 23 episodes of SmackDown and Raw, respectively. Randy Orton and Cody Rhodes, both from SmackDown, won their respective semifinal matches, setting up the King of the Ring final, while Raw's Asuka and SmackDown's Jade Cargill won their respective semifinal matches, setting up the Queen of the Ring final.

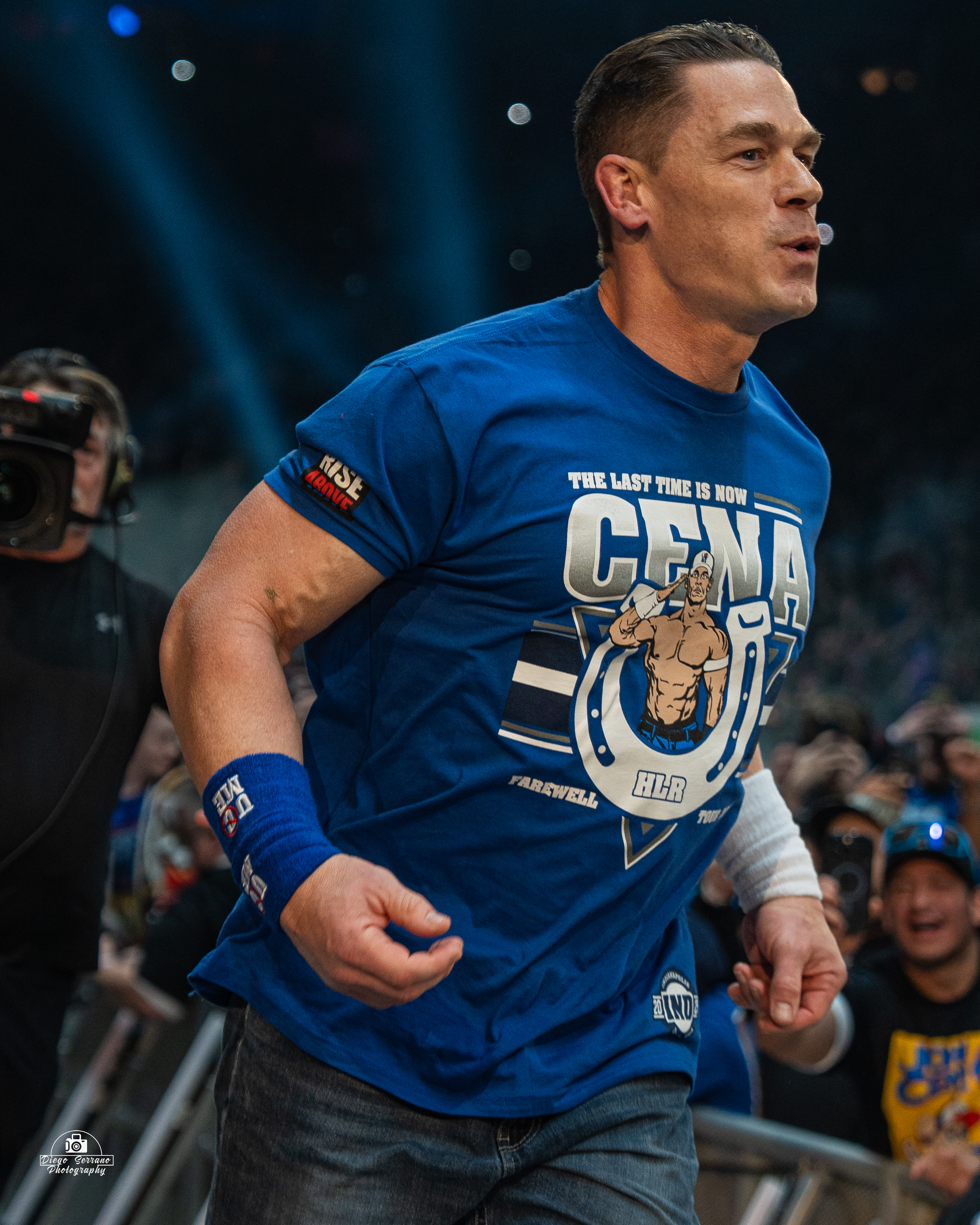
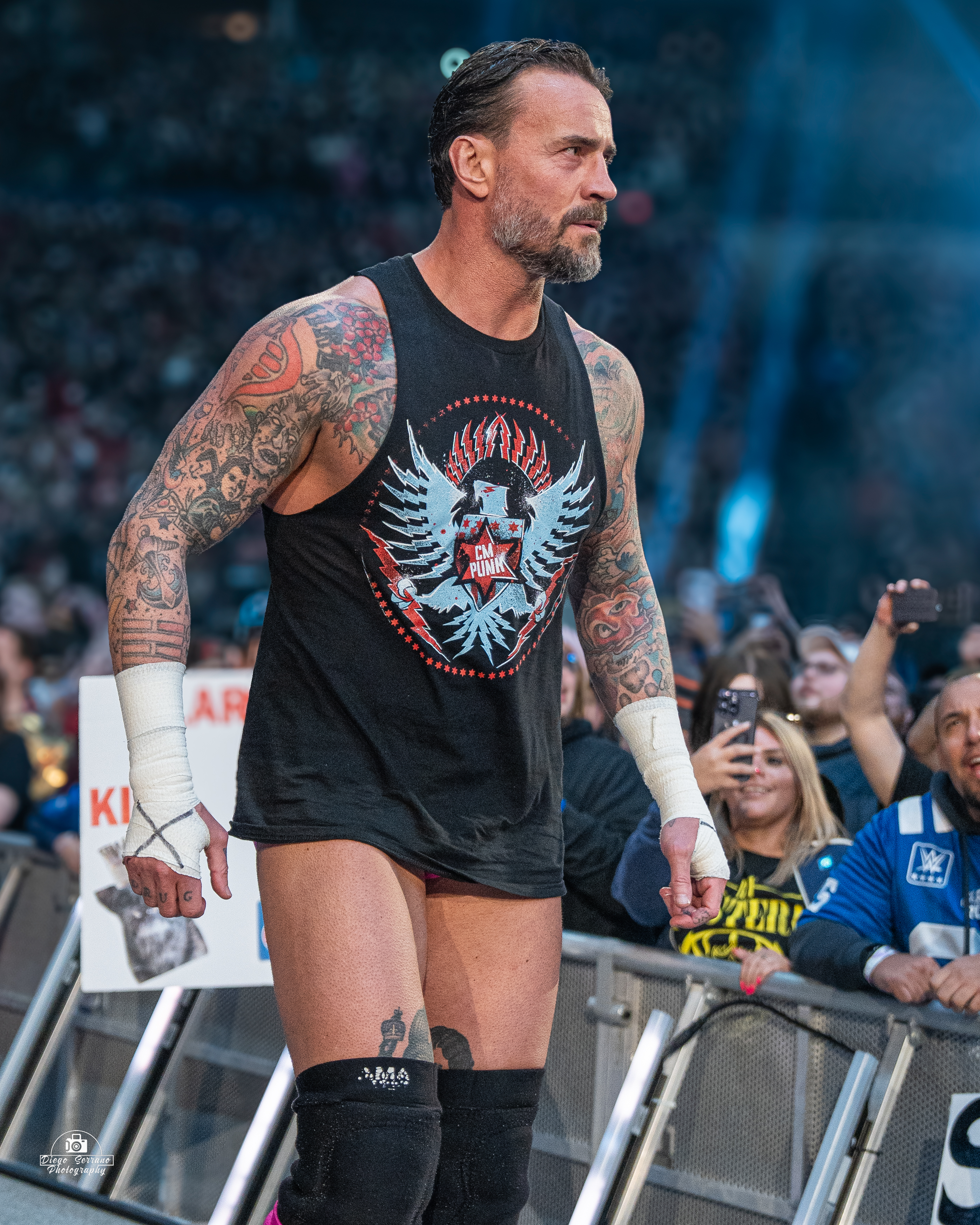
In their last match against each other, John Cena defended SmackDown's Undisputed WWE Championship against CM Punk.

At Elimination Chamber on March 1, John Cena won the men's Elimination Chamber match to earn a match for SmackDown's Undisputed WWE Championship at WrestleMania 41 by last eliminating longtime rival CM Punk; Cena would then turn heel moments later, portraying a villain for the first time in over 20 years. Cena would go on to win the championship on Night 2 of WrestleMania 41 on April 20. On the June 9 episode of Raw, Cena was confronted by Punk, who challenged Cena to an Undisputed WWE Championship match on that night's episode. Cena accepted Punk's challenge only if the title match was at Night of Champions in Saudi Arabia (a reference to Punk's legitimate past criticisms of the company's partnership with the country). Punk agreed, and the match was subsequently made official for Night of Champions.

As a result of Solo Sikoa losing the Anoaʻi family's Ula Fala necklace and title of "Tribal Chief" to his cousin Roman Reigns during Raw's Netflix premiere in January, tension arose between Sikoa and his other cousin and Bloodline stablemate, Jacob Fatu, which continued to build over the next few months. On the June 6 episode of SmackDown, Fatu overheard Sikoa insulting him while talking with JC Mateo, leading Fatu to betray Sikoa and cost him the Money in the Bank ladder match at the eponymous event the next night. On the following episode of SmackDown, Sikoa stated that he would appear on next week's episode, willing to accept Fatu back into the group. On the following episode, Sikoa apologized to Fatu, who did not accept it, and stated that Sikoa changed since he won the WWE United States Championship at WrestleMania 41 in April. Fatu then challenged Sikoa to a match for the title, however, Sikoa tried to attack Fatu, who prevented it. Mateo joined Sikoa to attack Fatu, who got the upper hand after an assist from his cousin Jimmy Uso. Later that night, Fatu announced that after speaking with SmackDown General Manager Nick Aldis, he would defend the title against Sikoa at Night of Champions.

On the June 9 episode of Raw, Raquel Rodriguez interfered in Rhea Ripley's Queen of the Ring qualifying match on behalf of her tag team partner Liv Morgan, costing Ripley the match. Ripley would in turn cost Rodriguez her qualifying match the following week. On the June 23 episode, Rodriguez called out Ripley, and a brawl ensued between both women, with Rodriguez performing a Tejana Bomb on Ripley through a table. Later, Ripley demanded Raw General Manager Adam Pearce for a match against Rodriguez, and a Street Fight was scheduled for Night of Champions.

Since early 2025, Karrion Kross had been targeting Sami Zayn with the two having several backstage confrontations as Kross taunted Zayn for failing in his world championship pursuits. After Zayn was eliminated in the semifinals of the King of the Ring tournament, Zayn was confronted by Kross once again on the June 23 episode of Raw, who claimed Zayn would never be a world champion. Zayn subsequently punched Kross, and announced that after talking with Raw General Manager Adam Pearce, a match between the two was made official. Later that night, it was confirmed that the match would take place at Night of Champions.

==== Cancelled matches ====
On the May 5 episode of Raw, AJ Styles stated that he would be coming after Dominik Mysterio's WWE Intercontinental Championship, with Mysterio asking his Judgment Day stablemate Finn Bálor to deal with Styles. A match between Bálor and Styles took place on the next episode, where Styles won, and on the following episode, Styles's team defeated Bálor and JD McDonagh in a tag team match. Their rivalry would resume a month later on the June 16 episode, where Styles defeated McDonagh. Following the match, Mysterio attacked Styles, however, Styles fought back. Mysterio was then saved by Bálor, with Styles retreating with Mysterio's championship. After Styles returned the championship to SmackDown General Manager Nick Aldis, who was subbing for Raw General Manager Adam Pearce that night, Aldis announced that Styles would face Mysterio for the Intercontinental Championship at Night of Champions. The following week, however, Pearce announced that as a result of an injury sustained by Mysterio, the match was postponed, and thus would not take place at Night of Champions.

On the June 16 episode of Raw, WWE began teasing a rivalry between Liv Morgan and Women's World Champion Iyo Sky, with later reports confirming that a match between the two for the title was set to take place at Night of Champions. However, during that same episode, Morgan suffered a legitimate dislocated shoulder in a match against Kairi Sane, thus scrapping those plans.

== Event ==
Other on-screen personnel
Role:	Name:
English commentators	Michael Cole
English commentators	Wade Barrett
Arabic commentators	Faisal Al-Mughaisib
Arabic commentators	Jude Al-Dajani
Spanish commentators	Marcelo Rodríguez
Spanish commentators	Jerry Soto
Ring announcer	Mark Nash
Referees	Danilo Anfibio
Referees	Dan Engler
Referees	Daphanie LaShaunn
Referees	Charles Robinson
Referees	Ryan Tran
Interviewer	Byron Saxton
Pre-show panel	Michael Cole
Pre-show panel	Jackie Redmond
Pre-show panel	Wade Barrett
Pre-show panel	Byron Saxton

=== Preliminary matches ===
The PLE began with the final of the 24th King of the Ring tournament, held between Cody Rhodes and Randy Orton, both from SmackDown. During the match, Rhodes performed a Cross Rhodes on Orton and Orton performed an RKO on Rhodes, both of which resulted in nearfalls. Orton attempted the Punt Kick, but Rhodes countered and applied a Figure Four Leglock on Orton, who reached the ropes to break the hold. Rhodes leapt off the middle rope, but Orton caught him with an RKO for a nearfall. As Orton retrieved a steel chair, the referee pulled it away. Orton then exposed the top turnbuckle, but Rhodes shoved him into it and performed Cross Rhodes on Orton and pinned him to win the match and become King of the Ring and earn a match for SmackDown's Undisputed WWE Championship at SummerSlam.

In the second match, Rhea Ripley took on Raquel Rodriguez in a Riyadh Boulevard Street Fight. Rodriguez dominated the majority of the match. During the match, Rodriguez retrieved a table and placed it in the corner of the ring. Ripley sent Rodriguez into the steel steps placed on the ring apron. Ripley then removed her belt and repeatedly whipped Rodriguez with it. Ripley performed a Razor's Edge Powerbomb and a kick on Rodriguez for a nearfall. Roxanne Perez showed up and attacked Ripley, only for Ripley to get the upper hand with a suplex outside the ring. Rodriguez then sent Ripley into the ring post and the steps before performing a corkscrew Vader Bomb for a nearfall. Rodriguez attempted a Tejana Bomb on Ripley through a table, but Ripley countered. In the end, Ripley performed an Avalanche Riptide on Rodriguez from the table, which was placed on the top ropes, and pinned her to win the match.

After that, Sami Zayn took on Karrion Kross. Kross applied the Kross Jacket on Zayn. Zayn tried to fight out of it, and eventually made it to the ropes to force a break. In the end, Zayn performed a Helluva Kick on Kross and pinned him to win the match.

In the fourth match, Jacob Fatu defended the United States Championship against Solo Sikoa. During the match, JC Mateo arrived and a returning Tonga Loa, who had been out with an injury since Survivor Series: WarGames in November 2024, performed a neckbreaker on Fatu. Sikoa then pinned Fatu for a nearfall. Fatu then performed a suicide dive on Loa and Mateo. Fatu had Sikoa pinned with a moonsault, but a debuting Hikuleo pulled Fatu out of the ring and chokeslammed him on the announce table. Inside the ring, Sikoa performed a Samoan Spike on Fatu and pinned him to win the title for the first time. It was later confirmed that Hikuleo's WWE ring name would be Talla Tonga.

In the penultimate match, SmackDown's Jade Cargill faced Raw's Asuka in the final of the third Queen of the Ring tournament. In the end, Asuka attempted Empress Impact, but Cargill countered it into Jaded and pinned her to win the match and become Queen of the Ring and earn a match for SmackDown's WWE Women's Championship at SummerSlam.

=== Main event ===
In the main event, John Cena defended the Undisputed WWE Championship against CM Punk. Throughout the match, Punk kicked out of three Attitude Adjustments. Punk also applied his own STF on Cena, who reached the ropes to break the hold. After Cena gave in to the fans and decided not to strike Punk with the title belt, Punk countered an Attitude Adjustment attempt into a GTS for a nearfall. While doing his shoulder tackles on Punk, Cena accidentally incapacitated the referee. Punk then performed the GTS on Cena, but there was no referee to make the count. Seth Rollins then arrived with Paul Heyman, Bron Breakker, and Bronson Reed in an attempt to cash in his Money in the Bank contract. Punk was able to momentarily subdue Breakker and Reed, who then slammed Punk through the announce table. Cena prevented referee Charles Robinson from heading to the ring and took out Rollins with an Attitude Adjustment. As Breakker and Reed attacked Cena, Penta fought them off, but was overpowered by Breakker until Sami Zayn made the save. Penta then took out Breakker and Zayn with a crossbody from the entrance ramp. Punk tossed Reed off the top rope and Cena performed an Attitude Adjustment on Reed. As Punk countered a low blow attempt into a GTS attempt, Rollins attacked Punk with a stomp. Cena then threw Rollins out of the ring and then pinned Punk to retain the title.

== Reception ==
Writing for the Wrestling Observer Newsletter, Dave Meltzer rated the King of the Ring final 4.5 stars, the Queen of the Ring final 2.25 stars, the Street Fight 4.25 stars, Zayn vs. Kross 3.25 stars, the United States Championship match 2.75 stars, and the Undisputed WWE Championship main event 3.5 stars.

== Aftermath ==
=== Raw ===
On the following episode of Raw, as Rhea Ripley was talking about her victory at Night of Champions, she was interrupted by Women's World Champion Iyo Sky. They subsequently agreed to a title match at Evolution.

Also on Raw, 2025 Men's Money in the Bank contract holder Seth Rollins interrupted World Heavyweight Champion Gunther and hinted at cashing in on him, before being attacked by first CM Punk, then LA Knight. A match between Rollins and Knight was scheduled for Saturday Night's Main Event XL, much to Punk's dismay. In the main event of the show, Bronson Reed and Bron Breakker defeated Sami Zayn and Penta. Reed and Breakker continued to attack Zayn and Penta after the match, before Jey Uso saved them.

Karrion Kross attacked Sami Zayn with a pipe, costing Zayn a tag team match later that night. The following week, Kross further targeted Zayn and attempted to once again strike Zayn with the pipe, but he was stopped by Raw General Manager Adam Pearce and some WWE personnel. This cost Zayn another match. Kross then defeated Zayn on the July 21 episode after striking Zayn with the pipe once again. On July 25, another match between Zayn and Kross was scheduled for SummerSlam.

=== SmackDown ===
On the following SmackDown, Cody Rhodes was congratulated on winning the King of the Ring tournament by runner-up Randy Orton, who wished Rhodes luck in defeating John Cena for the Undisputed WWE Championship at SummerSlam, before being interrupted by a returning Drew McIntyre. A match between McIntyre and Orton was subsequently scheduled for Saturday Night's Main Event XL. On the July 18 episode of SmackDown, during the contract signing for Cena and Rhodes's match, it was revealed that the match would be a Street Fight.

Also on SmackDown, Jacob Fatu and Jimmy Uso defeated United States Champion Solo Sikoa and JC Mateo. After the match, Sikoa, Tala Tonga, and Tonga Loa sent Fatu through the announce table. Two weeks later, Fatu was taken by police after an alleged involvement in a car accident involving Sikoa's group (kayfabe), however, later that night, Fatu returned. Following an altercation between Fatu and Sikoa's group, Raw General Manager Adam Pearce, who was filling in for SmackDown General Manager Nick Aldis that night, announced that Sikoa would defend the United States Championship against Fatu in a Steel Cage match at SummerSlam.

=== Broadcasting changes ===
In continuing WWE's near worldwide transition to Netflix, this would be the final Night of Champions to air on Disney+ in the Philippines before moving to Netflix on January 1, 2026. Throughout 2025, many of the select few countries that were still on the WWE Network due to pre-existing contracts gradually merged to Netflix with nearly all international markets on Netflix by January 1, 2026. The last few remaining countries that were still on the WWE Network merged under Netflix on April 1, 2026, making this 2025 event the last Night of Champions to air on the WWE Network in any country. Additionally, on August 6, 2025, WWE announced that ESPN's direct-to-consumer streaming service would assume the streaming rights of WWE's main roster PLEs in the United States. This was originally to begin with WrestleMania 42 in April 2026, but was pushed up to September 2025 with Wrestlepalooza. As such, this was the last Night of Champions to livestream on Peacock in the US.

== Results ==
No.	Results	Stipulations	Times
1	Cody Rhodes defeated Randy Orton by pinfall	King of the Ring tournament final Since Rhodes won, he was crowned "King of the Ring" and earned a match for SmackDown's Undisputed WWE Championship at SummerSlam. (Note: Had Orton won, he would have also challenged for the Undisputed WWE Championship at SummerSlam as he was also from SmackDown.)	19:45
2	Rhea Ripley defeated Raquel Rodriguez by pinfall	Riyadh Boulevard Street Fight	14:00
3	Sami Zayn defeated Karrion Kross (with Scarlett) by pinfall	Singles match	13:35
4	Solo Sikoa defeated Jacob Fatu (c) by pinfall	Singles match for the WWE United States Championship	12:05
5	Jade Cargill defeated Asuka by pinfall	Queen of the Ring tournament final Since Cargill won, she was crowned "Queen of the Ring" and earned a match for SmackDown's WWE Women's Championship at SummerSlam. (Note: Had Asuka won, she would have challenged for Raw's Women's World Championship at SummerSlam.)	8:35
6	John Cena (c) defeated CM Punk by pinfall	Singles match for the Undisputed WWE Championship	26:15
(c) / – the champion(s) heading into the match

=== King of the Ring tournament ===
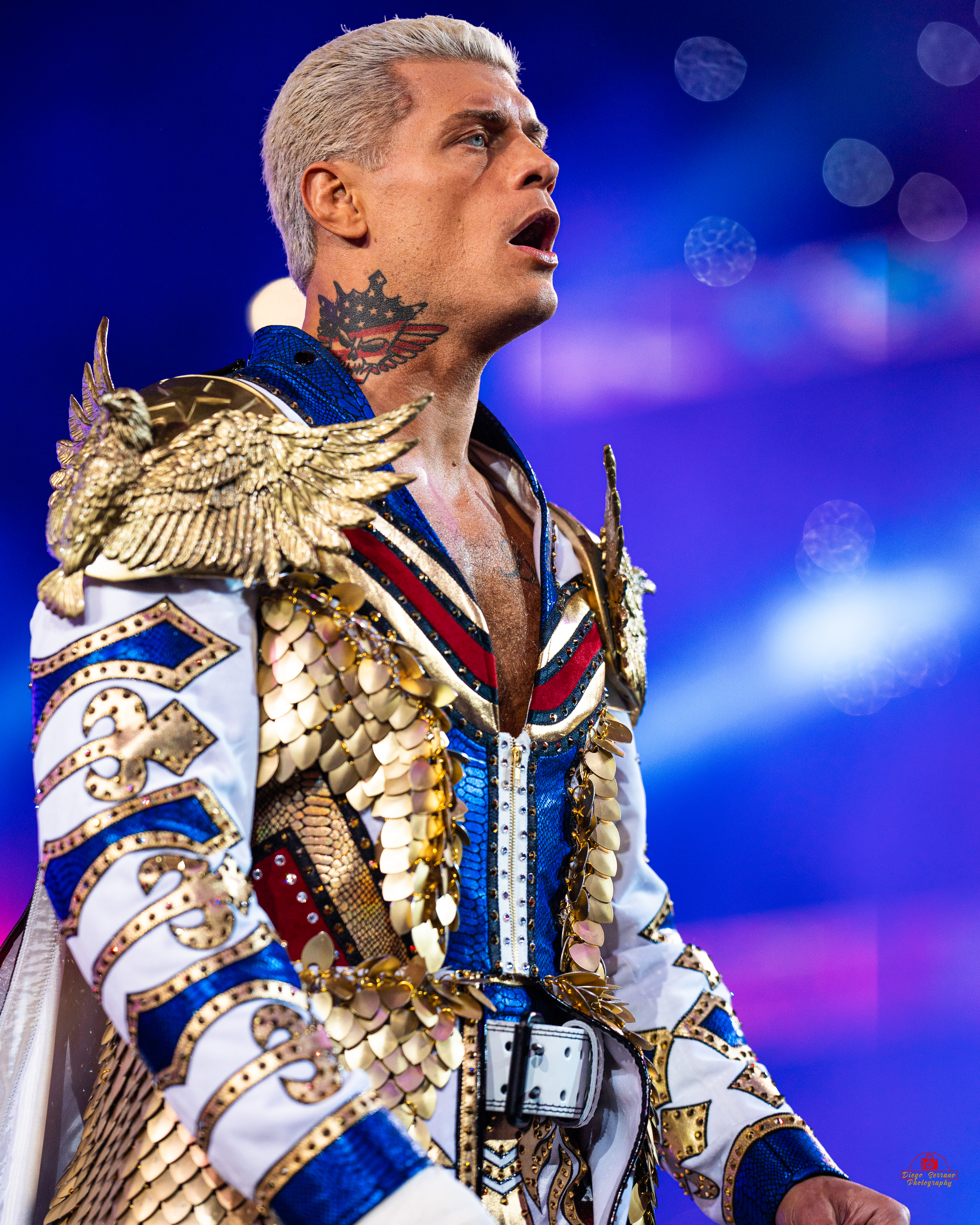
2025 King of the Ring winner Cody Rhodes.

First round (Raw, June 9, June 16) (SmackDown, June 13)
Bron Breakker	–
Dominik Mysterio	17:05
Penta	–
Sami Zayn	Pin
Aleister Black	–
Carmelo Hayes	–
LA Knight	16:15
Randy Orton	Pin
Andrade	–
Cody Rhodes	Pin
Damian Priest	–
Shinsuke Nakamura	17:05
Bronson Reed	17:25
Jey Uso	Pin
Rusev	–
Sheamus	–

Semifinals (SmackDown, June 20) (Raw, June 23)
Sami Zayn	11:25
Randy Orton	Pin
Cody Rhodes	Pin
Jey Uso	20:00

Final (Night of Champions, June 28)
Randy Orton	19:45
Cody Rhodes	Pin

=== Queen of the Ring tournament ===
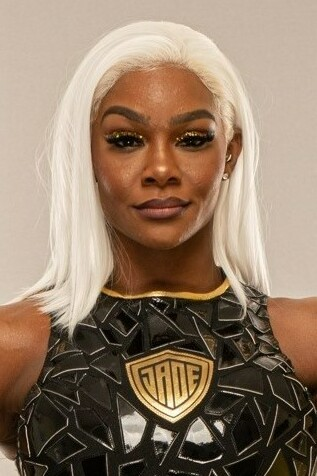
2025 Queen of the Ring winner Jade Cargill.

First round (Raw, June 9, June 16) (SmackDown, June 13)
Kairi Sane	12:50
Liv Morgan	–
Rhea Ripley	–
Roxanne Perez	Pin
Jade Cargill	Pin
Michin	–
Nia Jax	–
Piper Niven	12:50
Alba Fyre (Note: Replaced her Green Regime stablemate Chelsea Green, who (in kayfabe) could not find the city where the show was taking place.)	–
Alexa Bliss	Pin
Candice LeRae	11:00
Charlotte Flair	–
Asuka	Pin
Ivy Nile	–
Raquel Rodriguez	15:50
Stephanie Vaquer	–

Semifinals (SmackDown, June 20) (Raw, June 23)
Roxanne Perez	11:30
Jade Cargill	Pin
Alexa Bliss	9:25
Asuka	Pin

Final (Night of Champions, June 28)
Jade Cargill	Pin
Asuka	8:35
