= Survivor Series: WarGames (2022) =

WWE premium live event

- Promotional poster featuring The Bloodline (Solo Sikoa, Paul Heyman, Roman Reigns, Sami Zayn, Jey Uso, and Jimmy Uso)
- Promotion: WWE
- Brand(s): Raw; SmackDown
- Date: November 26, 2022
- City: Boston, Massachusetts
- Venue: TD Garden
- Attendance: 15,609

WWE event chronology
← Previous; Crown Jewel	Next → NXT Deadline

Survivor Series chronology
← Previous; 2021	Next → 2023

The 2022 Survivor Series: WarGames was a professional wrestling premium live event (PLE) produced by WWE, held for wrestlers from the promotion's main roster brands, Raw and SmackDown. It was the 36th annual Survivor Series and took place on Saturday, November 26, 2022, at TD Garden in Boston, Massachusetts. This was the first Survivor Series to be branded as "WarGames", and as such, it centered on the WarGames match, a type of roofless steel cage match that surrounds two rings placed side by side and is contested by teams of multiple wrestlers; the first team to score a pinfall or submission wins while escaping the cage is a forfeit.

With the event's rebranding to "WarGames", it ended the "brand supremacy" theme of the events from 2016 to 2021. It also ended the annual WarGames event for WWE's developmental brand NXT that was held from 2017 to 2021, subsequently marking WWE's first main roster PLE to feature the WarGames match, with one each for the men and women. Due to hosting the WarGames matches, this was the first Survivor Series since the 2002 event to not feature a traditional Survivor Series match, and only the third event to not include one, after the 1998 and 2002 events. Subsequently beginning with this event, Survivor Series no longer features the titular Survivor Series match as it has instead featured the WarGames matches.

Five matches were contested at the event, including two WarGames matches. The main event, which was the main match from SmackDown, was the men's WarGames match in which The Bloodline (Roman Reigns, Jey Uso, Jimmy Uso, Solo Sikoa, and Sami Zayn) defeated Team Brawling Brutes (Sheamus, Ridge Holland, Butch, Drew McIntyre, and Kevin Owens). The women's WarGames match opened the show and was the main match from Raw that saw Team Belair (Bianca Belair, Alexa Bliss, Asuka, Mia Yim, and Becky Lynch) defeat Team Damage CTRL (Bayley, Dakota Kai, Iyo Sky, Nikki Cross, and Rhea Ripley).

This was the third Survivor Series to be held at the TD Garden, after the 2008 event, when it was known as TD Banknorth Garden, and the 2013 event, and subsequently the fourth overall in Boston, including the 1993 event at the original Boston Garden. It was also the first Survivor Series to take place on a Saturday and the first since the 1994 event to not take place on a Sunday. This was also the first Survivor Series to be branded as a "premium live event", a term the company introduced at the start of the year to refer to its events airing on traditional pay-per-view (PPV) and via WWE's livestreaming platforms. This would also be WWE's last main roster PLE to take place before Stephanie McMahon announced her resignation as co-Chief Executive Officer and Chairwoman of WWE, with Vince McMahon subsequently returning as Executive Chairman in January 2023. It was also WWE's final main roster PLE to be available to livestream on the Australian version of the WWE Network before it transferred to Binge on January 23, 2023. Additionally, this was the first Survivor Series to livestream on Disney+ Hotstar in Indonesia as well as WWE's first PLE to livestream on Disney+ in the Philippines.

Survivor Series: WarGames was the highest-grossing Survivor Series of all time, as well as the highest-grossing gate for WWE in Boston. It was also the most-viewed Survivor Series. WWE reported that the event was a complete sellout, with a disputed attendance of 15,609. The event also received critical acclaim, with high praise directed towards the WarGames matches for their storytelling and long-term booking, while also praising AJ Styles vs. Finn Bálor, and Raw's United States Championship triple threat match. Dave Meltzer of the Wrestling Observer Newsletter would go on to rate a majority of the matches three-and-three-quarters stars or higher, with only the SmackDown Women's Championship match receiving a negative response.

== Production ==
=== Background ===
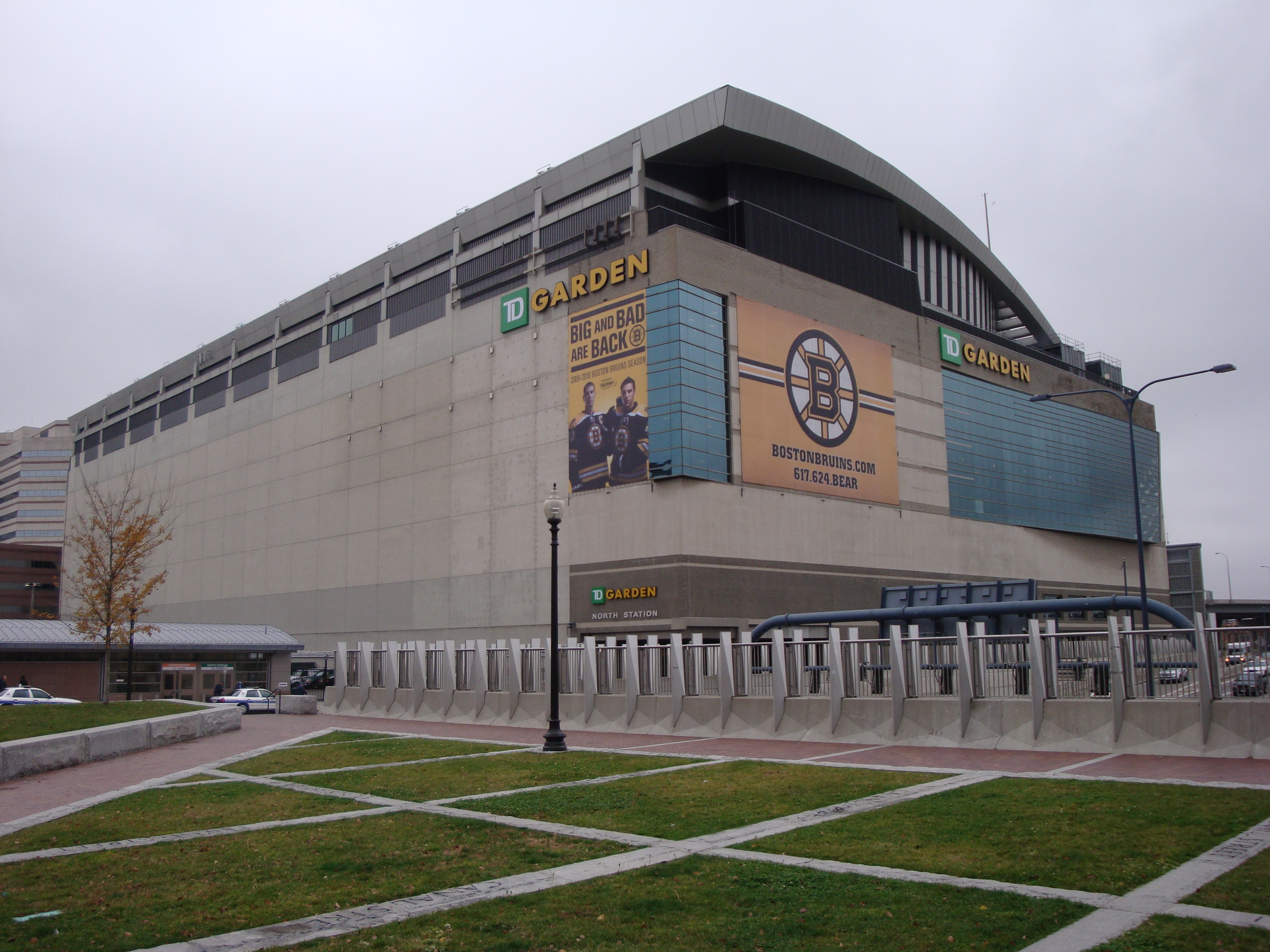
The 36th annual Survivor Series was the second time for the event to be held at the TD Garden in Boston, Massachusetts, after the 2008 event, when it was known as TD Banknorth Garden, and the 2013 event. It would also be the fourth overall in Boston, including the 1993 event.

Survivor Series is an annual professional wrestling premium live event (PLE) produced every November by WWE since 1987, generally held around Thanksgiving in the United States. It was originally broadcast exclusively via pay-per-view (PPV) before it began simulcasting on WWE's livestreaming platforms in 2014. In what has become the second longest-running PPV event in history (behind WWE's WrestleMania), it is one of the promotion's original four PPVs, along with WrestleMania, SummerSlam, and Royal Rumble, referred to as the "Big Four", and as of August 2021, it is considered one of the "Big Five", along with Money in the Bank.

Announced on October 25, 2021, the 36th Survivor Series was scheduled to occur on Saturday, November 26, 2022, at the TD Garden in Boston, Massachusetts, marking the first Survivor Series to be held on a Saturday and the first to not be held on a Sunday since the 1994 event, which was on a Wednesday. This also marked the third Survivor Series at the venue, after the 2008 event when it was known as TD Banknorth Garden, and the 2013 event, and the fourth overall in Boston, including the 1993 event at the original Boston Garden. Tickets went on sale on August 26, 2022, with premium hospitality packages also available. This was also the first Survivor Series to be branded as a "premium live event", a term the company introduced on January 1 to refer to its events that are available on PPV and via livestreaming.

From 1987 to 2021, the event was traditionally characterized by having Survivor Series matches, which were tag team elimination matches that typically featured teams of four or five wrestlers against each other. On September 19, 2022, however, WWE executive Paul "Triple H" Levesque announced that instead of Survivor Series matches, the 2022 event would feature two WarGames matches, one each for the men and women that would be 5-versus-5, marking WWE's first main roster PLE to feature the match. WarGames is a type of steel cage match where the two teams face each other in a roofless cage that surrounds two rings placed side by side but is decided by one fall instead of eliminating all opponents and escaping the cage is a forfeit for that team. The 2022 event was in turn renamed as Survivor Series: WarGames, and was subsequently the third Survivor Series to not feature any Survivor Series matches, after 1998 and 2002. WWE's developmental brand NXT previously held an annual WarGames event from 2017 to 2021. With the WarGames match moving to the main roster for Survivor Series, this subsequently ended NXT's WarGames event, which was replaced by Deadline.

After WWE reintroduced the brand split in July 2016, Survivor Series centered around competition between wrestlers from Raw and SmackDown for brand supremacy (NXT was also involved in 2019 but removed in 2020). In addition to traditional Survivor Series matches between the brands, the champions of each brand faced off in non-title matches. Along with the announcement that the 2022 event would feature WarGames matches, Triple H also confirmed that the 2022 event would not be based on the brand supremacy concept.

In an interview with The Ringer in regard to the changes for the 2022 Survivor Series, Triple H stated:

The tradition of the Survivor Series has ebbed and flowed and changed slightly over time, but this will be similar to that. This will not be Raw versus SmackDown. It will be much more story-line driven. I still look at it as a traditional component to Survivor Series in there because it's large teams of people competing. We just upped the ante a little bit with WarGames and made it evolve. Survivor Series has been an amazing event for 36 years. And it needs to evolve a little bit and this year seemed like the right time to do it.

=== Broadcast outlets ===
The PLE was broadcast on traditional PPV outlets worldwide. It was also available to livestream on Peacock in the United States, SonyLIV in India, Disney+ Hotstar in Indonesia, Disney+ in the Philippines, and the WWE Network everywhere else. This was the first Survivor Series to livestream on Disney+ Hotstar in Indonesia, following the shutdown of its version of the WWE Network in late January. This was also WWE's first PLE to livestream on Disney+ in the Philippines after it was announced that The Walt Disney Company and WWE inked a deal to make Disney+ as its exclusive home for WWE Network in the Philippines, which began on November 17.

=== Storylines ===
The event included matches that resulted from scripted storylines. Results were predetermined by WWE's writers on the Raw and SmackDown brands, while storylines were produced on WWE's weekly television shows, Monday Night Raw and Friday Night SmackDown.

After Bianca Belair retained the Raw Women's Championship against Becky Lynch at SummerSlam, Belair was confronted by a returning Bayley, accompanied by Dakota Kai and Iyo Sky, with Lynch standing with Belair. Lynch then took time off due to an injury, while Bayley's team would dub themselves as Damage CTRL and began feuding with the trio of Belair, Alexa Bliss, and Asuka. While Belair and Bayley fought over the Raw Women's Championship with Belair retaining in both encounters, Bliss and Asuka traded the WWE Women's Tag Team Championship with Kai and Sky, with Nikki Cross costing Bliss and Asuka the title. On the November 7 episode of Raw, Belair, Bliss, and Asuka challenged Damage CTRL to a WarGames match at Survivor Series: WarGames. Damage CTRL accepted the challenge and subsequently recruited Cross to their team. The following week, Mia Yim, who had returned to WWE the previous week, joined Belair's team, while Rhea Ripley joined Bayley's team. On the November 21 episode of Raw, Ripley defeated Asuka to give Bayley's team the advantage in the WarGames match, and on the November 25 episode of SmackDown, a returning Lynch was revealed as the fifth member of Belair's team.

In mid-October, The Brawling Brutes (Sheamus, Ridge Holland, and Butch) began feuding with The Usos (Jey Uso and Jimmy Uso), Solo Sikoa, and Sami Zayn of The Bloodline, including an unsuccessful attempt at The Usos's Undisputed WWE Tag Team Championship. On the November 11 episode of SmackDown, the two teams brawled, which also involved Bloodline leader and Undisputed WWE Universal Champion Roman Reigns; Drew McIntyre also joined the fray, siding with The Brawling Brutes. The following week, it was confirmed that The Brawling Brutes would face The Bloodline in a WarGames match at Survivor Series: WarGames. Despite McIntyre's past issues with Sheamus, they made amends and he joined Sheamus's team as he had his own issues with The Bloodline. Later that night, following Butch's win over Zayn, the two teams brawled, after which, Kevin Owens made his return from injury and revealed himself as the fifth member of Sheamus's team with Owens also having previous issues with The Bloodline. On the November 25 episode of SmackDown, McIntyre and Sheamus defeated The Usos to get the advantage in the WarGames match.

On the November 11 episode of SmackDown, Shotzi won a six-pack challenge to earn a SmackDown Women's Championship match against Ronda Rousey at Survivor Series: WarGames.

In early October, The O.C. (AJ Styles, Luke Gallows, and Karl Anderson) began a rivalry with The Judgment Day (Finn Bálor, Damian Priest, Dominik Mysterio, and Rhea Ripley), but The O.C. were always at a disadvantage due to Ripley, who cost The O.C. their six-man tag team match against her stablemates at Crown Jewel. On the November 7 episode of Raw, The O.C. confronted The Judgment Day and introduced the returning Mia Yim as their solution to deal with Ripley. The following week, a singles match between Styles and Bálor was scheduled for Survivor Series: WarGames, with their respective stablemates in their corners.

On the November 7 episode of Raw, Seth "Freakin" Rollins held an open challenge for the United States Championship, which was answered by Bobby Lashley, who Rollins controversially won the title from a few weeks prior. The match, however, never commenced as Lashley instead attacked Rollins before the match could begin. After the beat down, Austin Theory ran out and cashed in his Money in the Bank contract on a weakened Rollins; however, Rollins retained the title thanks to interference from Lashley. The following week, Lashley said he would continue to target Rollins until he won back the championship, and later that night, Theory attacked Rollins after the latter's title defense. On the November 21 episode, it was announced that Rollins would defend the United States Championship against Lashley and Theory in a triple threat match at Survivor Series: WarGames.

== Event ==
Other on-screen personnel
Role:	Name:
English commentators	Michael Cole
English commentators	Corey Graves
Spanish commentators	Marcelo Rodriguez
Spanish commentators	Jerry Soto
Ring announcers	Mike Rome (Raw)
Ring announcers	Samantha Irvin (SmackDown/Men's WarGames match)
Ring announcers	Alicia Taylor (Women's WarGames match)
Referees	Danilo Anfibio
Referees	Jason Ayers
Referees	Dan Engler
Referees	Daphanie LaShaunn
Referees	Eddie Orengo
Referees	Chad Patton
Referees	Ryan Tran
Interviewer	Megan Morant
Pre-show panel	Kayla Braxton
Pre-show panel	Kevin Patrick
Pre-show panel	Peter Rosenberg
Pre-show panel	Booker T
Pre-show panel	Jerry Lawler

=== Preliminary matches ===
The PLE began with the women's WarGames match, which saw Team Belair (Bianca Belair, Alexa Bliss, Asuka, Mia Yim, and Becky Lynch) facing Team Damage CTRL (Bayley, Dakota Kai, Iyo Sky, Nikki Cross, and Rhea Ripley). Belair and Kai started the match. As Damage CTRL had the WarGames advantage, Sky entered next, followed by Asuka, Cross, and Bliss. Cross performed a Cross Body off the cage onto everyone else. The rest of the entry order went Bayley, Yim, Ripley, then finally Lynch. After WarGames officially began, Lynch performed a Diving Leg Drop on Sky, who was stuck in a trash can. Ripley performed Riptide on Lynch for a nearfall. Asuka spat green mist in Ripley's face. Bayley performed the Rose Plant on Lynch onto the metal plate connecting the two rings. Sky performed a Moonsault off the top of the cage onto everyone. In the end, Belair performed the Kiss of Death on Bayley into the cage and moments later, Lynch performed a Double Diving Leg Drop from the top of the cage on Kai and Sky through a table and pinned Kai to win the match for Team Belair.

Backstage, Jey Uso, who had never trusted or liked Sami Zayn, spoke with Roman Reigns regarding Zayn's loyalty to The Bloodline, as Jey overheard Zayn conversing with Kevin Owens on SmackDown the night before where Owens told Zayn to turn on The Bloodline; however, Zayn seemingly feigned ignorance and lied about the encounter when Jey confronted Zayn. Reigns then stated that he would take care of it and then instructed Paul Heyman to call Zayn to meet with Reigns.

Next, AJ Styles (accompanied by The O.C., Luke Gallows and Karl Anderson) faced Finn Bálor (accompanied The Judgment Day, Damian Priest and Dominik Mysterio). During the match, a brawl ensued at ringside between Gallows, Anderson, Mysterio, and Priest and the four fought into the crowd. In the closing moments, after the two traded counters in between the two rings, Styles performed a Phenomenal Forearm on Bálor to win the match.

After that, Ronda Rousey (accompanied by Shayna Baszler) defended the SmackDown Women's Championship against Shotzi. During the match, Shotzi performed a springboard DDT on Rousey and followed up with a crossbody onto Rousey and Baszler into the crowd. Back in the ring, Rousey performed Piper's Pit on Shotzi and forced Shotzi to submit to an armbar to retain the title.

In another backstage segment, Sami Zayn met with Roman Reigns, who questioned why Zayn lied to Jey Uso about conversing with Kevin Owens. Zayn claimed that he did not want to put too much pressure on Jey as Jey had a match on SmackDown that night and maintained that his loyalty was with The Bloodline. Reigns seemingly accepted that Zayn was telling the truth.

In the penultimate match, Seth "Freakin" Rollins defended the United States Championship against Bobby Lashley and Austin Theory in a triple threat match. Rollins performed a Pedigree on Lashley for a nearfall. Lashley applied the Hurt Lock on both Rollins and Theory simultaneously, however, Rollins and Theory escaped. With Theory in position for a Curb Stomp, Rollins stepped over Theory for leverage and performed a Curb Stomp on Lashley instead. In the end, as Rollins attempted a Falcon Arrow on Theory, Lashley performed a Spear on Rollins, and Theory fell into a pin onto Rollins to win the title for a second time.

Before the main event, in a final backstage segment, Jey Uso asked Roman Reigns if Sami Zayn had lied to Reigns as well. Reigns claimed that he looked Zayn in the eyes and saw what he needed to see.

=== Main event ===
The main event was the men's WarGames match, which saw The Bloodline (Roman Reigns, Jey Uso, Jimmy Uso, Solo Sikoa, and Sami Zayn) (accompanied by Paul Heyman) facing Team Brawling Brutes (Sheamus, Ridge Holland, Butch, Drew McIntyre, and Kevin Owens). The Bloodline also debuted its new entrance graphics on the screen with Roman Reigns' theme "Head of the Table" by def rebel playing on the background. Butch and Jey started the match. The Brutes had the WarGames advantage as Holland entered next. As Jey's older brother Jimmy attempted to enter, Reigns stopped him and picked Zayn to enter instead to test his loyalty to The Bloodline. The remainder of the entry order went McIntyre, Jimmy, Owens, Sikoa, Sheamus, and finally Reigns. All of The Brutes performed ten Beats of the Bodhran on The Bloodline. As Sheamus went for the Brogue Kick, Reigns performed a Spear on Sheamus, but Butch broke the pin. Jey missed Butch with a superkick and accidentally hit Zayn instead. The Usos performed a 1D off the top rope on Butch, but Holland broke the pin. Reigns drove Holland through a cornered table with a Spear. Sikoa put McIntyre through a table with a Spinning Solo. In the climax, Owens performed a pop-up powerbomb and a stunner on Reigns, but Zayn stopped the referee from counting the three. A conflicted Zayn then performed a low blow on Owens followed by a Helluva Kick before catching Owens and shoving him to the mat. Zayn then allowed Jey to perform the Uso splash on Owens to win the match for The Bloodline. Jey finally accepted Zayn as part of The Bloodline and the team celebrated as Reigns looked pleased with Zayn's actions.

== Reception ==
=== Commercial ===
During the Survivor Series: WarGames post-event press conference, Triple H revealed that the event was the highest-grossing Survivor Series of all time and was the most viewed. He also said the event was a complete sellout, and was the highest-grossing gate for WWE in Boston. According to WWE, the event sold 15,609 tickets. However, the company have often been reported to inflate their attendance figures; for example, they include WWE personnel in their numbers. The event's set up was for 13,042 paid seats, with 40 tickets still available just hours before the event. According to Triple H, they kept opening up more seats until they reached max capacity with the staging configuration.

=== Critical ===
The event received critical acclaim. Praise was directed to the WarGames matches for their storytelling and long-term booking, Styles vs. Balor, and the US Title Triple Threat match, while Rousey vs. Shotzi received a mixed-to-negative response. Dave Meltzer of the Wrestling Observer Newsletter would rate the WarGames matches 4 stars (women's) and 4-and-a-quarter stars (men's), the US Title match 4-and-a-quarter stars, Styles vs. Balor three-and-three-quarters stars, and Rousey vs. Shotzi one star.

Subhojeet Mukherjee of Ringside News stated that fans were not at all interested in the SmackDown Women's Championship match, as while the match was underway, they chanted "We want Sasha" (referencing Sasha Banks, who walked out in the middle of Raw in May along with Naomi), so they "have clearly not stopped wanting her to come back to the company", but WWE "muted the Sasha Banks chants". Shakiel Mahjouri of CBS Sports stated that the only bad match at the event was the SmackDown Women's Championship match, which he gave a grade of D. He said that the match was "a touch rough", stating that "Shotzi got way too much offense in considering her recent booking", and that "both superstars had disjointed moments". He also stated that fans weren't interested in that match at all, and they "broke into chants of "We Want Sasha [Banks]" at one point".

== Aftermath ==
Survivor Series: WarGames would be WWE's final PLE in which Stephanie McMahon served as co-Chief Executive Officer (CEO) and Chairwoman of WWE, as she announced her resignation on January 10, 2023. Nick Khan became the sole CEO, while Vince McMahon, who had announced his retirement as CEO and chairman in July, returned as Executive Chairman. Triple H maintained creative control.

On September 28, 2022, WWE announced an agreement with its Australian rightsholder Foxtel, which saw WWE Network merged into its streaming service Binge beginning in January 2023, with a launch set for January 23, 2023. As part of the agreement, Foxtel's channel Fox8 continued to carry WWE programming, and Foxtel also introduced a new, WWE-branded linear channel. As a result, Survivor Series: WarGames was the final main roster PLE to air on the Australian version of the WWE Network.

=== Raw ===
On the following episode of Raw, The Usos (Jey Uso and Jimmy Uso), Sami Zayn, and Solo Sikoa celebrated The Bloodline's victory, but Kevin Owens interrupted and told Zayn that their friendship was done. Owens then challenged Jey to a match for the main event, which Jey accepted and Owens won. Over the coming weeks, The Usos, Zayn, and Sikoa continued invading Raw, with Owens trying to stop their attacks. The invasion persisted up until the January 9, 2023, episode, which led to WWE official Adam Pearce ordering The Usos to defend the Raw Tag Team Championship against the winner of that night's tag team gauntlet match, which was won by The Judgment Day (Damian Priest and Dominik Mysterio). The match was subsequently scheduled for Raw Is XXX on January 23, and that was the first instance of The Usos defending the Raw and SmackDown Tag Team Championships separately.

Also on Raw, Becky Lynch celebrated her team's victory and cut a promo from the crowd. Bayley distracted Lynch, which led to Dakota Kai and Iyo Sky brawling with Lynch, which spilled out throughout the arena. The following week, two triple threat matches with Raw Women's Championship implications took place. Bayley won the first, while Alexa Bliss won the second after interference from Sky and Kai. On the December 12 episode, Bliss defeated Bayley to become the number one contender for Bianca Belair's Raw Women's Championship, and the match was later scheduled for the January 2, 2023, episode. During the match, Bliss was distracted by people wearing Uncle Howdy masks (due to Bliss' past association with Bray Wyatt), and the Wyatt moth logo flashed on the TitanTron. The content caused Bliss to snap and attack the referee, causing Belair to win via disqualification and retain the title. After the match, Bliss viciously attacked Belair, performing two DDTs onto the steel steps. A rematch between the two for the title was later scheduled for the Royal Rumble.

Before the aforementioned number one contender's match on the December 12 episode of Raw, Becky Lynch sent Bayley's Damage CTRL members, Dakota Kai and Iyo Sky, retreating with a chair. A match between Bayley and Lynch took place the following week, where Bayley won with the distraction of Kai and Sky. On the January 2, 2023, episode, Bayley distracted Lynch, causing her to lose in tag team action. Two weeks later, Lynch claimed Bayley always had to hide behind Kai and Sky and goaded Bayley into accepting a Steel Cage match against her at Raw Is XXX.

Mia Yim faced Rhea Ripley, but the match ended in a no-contest when The Judgment Day (Finn Bálor, Damian Priest, and Dominik Mysterio) and The O.C. (AJ Styles, Luke Gallows, and Karl Anderson) interfered. This led to an eight-person mixed tag team match where Judgment Day defeated The O.C. when Ripley pinned Yim. This ultimately ended the rivalry between the two teams.

New United States Champion Austin Theory came out to address his win. Seth "Freakin" Rollins interrupted to congratulate Theory and challenged him to a rematch for the title, but Theory refused, stating he would fight on his own time. The following week, after Rollins and Bobby Lashley brawled, a match between Lashley and Rollins to determine the number one contender for the U.S. title was scheduled for the December 12 episode, where Rollins won. Following the match, Lashley attacked a referee, resulting in him being fired by WWE official Adam Pearce; however, Pearce later took to social media to reverse his decision but said there would be ramifications for Lashley's actions. Rollins' United States Championship match was also confirmed for the January 2, 2023, episode, but Rollins failed to win the title. After returning on the January 9 episode, Lashley won a six-man elimination match the following week to become the new number one contender for the U.S. title. The match was also scheduled for Raw Is XXX, and was later stipulated as a No Disqualification match.

=== SmackDown ===
On the following episode of SmackDown, Sami Zayn credited The Usos (Jey Uso and Jimmy Uso) for securing their team's win; however, The Usos said it was because of Zayn. Sheamus interrupted, leading to a match between Zayn and Sheamus. During the match, a brawl between The Brawling Brutes (Ridge Holland and Butch) and The Bloodline (The Usos and Solo Sikoa) occurred at ringside, which allowed Jey to interfere in the match and give Zayn the win. The following week, The Usos successfully retained the Undisputed WWE Tag Team Championship against Sheamus and Butch after interference from Zayn and Sikoa. Afterwards, it was announced that Roman Reigns would return on the December 16 episode of SmackDown. There, it was revealed that Reigns and Zayn would face Kevin Owens and a partner of his choosing on the December 30 episode of SmackDown with Owens choosing John Cena as his partner, marking Cena's first televised match since SummerSlam in 2021, as well as his only match in 2022. On the December 30 episode, Owens and Cena defeated Reigns and Zayn when Owens pinned Zayn. The following week, Owens challenged Reigns for the Undisputed WWE Universal Championship at the Royal Rumble, which was made official. Also on that same episode, Drew McIntyre and Sheamus unsuccessfully challenged The Usos for the Undisputed WWE Tag Team Championship after interference from Sikoa.

On the December 9 episode of SmackDown, Shayna Baszler and SmackDown Women's Champion Ronda Rousey attacked Shotzi in the parking lot. It was then reported that Shotzi suffered a broken hand, and would be out of action for six weeks.

At the Royal Rumble, after Roman Reigns retained the Undisputed WWE Universal Championship against Kevin Owens, The Usos (Jey Uso and Jimmy Uso) and Solo Sikoa attacked Owens while Sami Zayn watched on in uncertainty. Reigns instructed Zayn to attack Owens with a chair to prove his loyalty, however, Zayn turned on and attacked Reigns with the chair instead. Zayn then apologized to Jey, who he had become friends with, only for Jimmy, Sikoa, and Reigns to attack Zayn as an emotionally distraught Jey left the ring as the rest of The Bloodline continued the assault. This would lead to a title match between Zayn and Reigns at Elimination Chamber where Reigns retained. After the match, Owens prevented The Bloodline (except Jey) from doing further damage to Zayn. After several more weeks of feuding on the following episodes of Raw and SmackDown, including Jey turning on Zayn, on the March 17 episode of SmackDown, Owens saved Zayn from an attack by The Usos, and the two embraced. It was then confirmed that Zayn and Owens would face The Usos for the Undisputed WWE Tag Team Championship at WrestleMania 39.

== Results ==
No.	Results	Stipulations	Times
1	Team Belair (Bianca Belair, Alexa Bliss, Asuka, Mia Yim, and Becky Lynch) defeated Team Damage CTRL (Bayley, Dakota Kai, Iyo Sky, Nikki Cross, and Rhea Ripley) by pinfall	Women's WarGames match	39:40
2	AJ Styles (with Luke Gallows and Karl Anderson) defeated Finn Bálor (with Damian Priest and Dominik Mysterio) by pinfall	Singles match	18:25
3	Ronda Rousey (c) (with Shayna Baszler) defeated Shotzi by submission	Singles match for the WWE SmackDown Women's Championship	7:15
4	Austin Theory defeated Seth "Freakin" Rollins (c) and Bobby Lashley by pinfall	Triple threat match for the WWE United States Championship	14:50
5	The Bloodline (Roman Reigns, Jey Uso, Jimmy Uso, Solo Sikoa, and Sami Zayn) (with Paul Heyman) defeated The Brawling Brutes (Sheamus, Ridge Holland, and Butch), Drew McIntyre, and Kevin Owens by pinfall	Men's WarGames match	38:30
(c) / – the champion(s) heading into the match
