= Extreme Rules (2022) =

WWE premium live event

- Promotional poster featuring Ronda Rousey
- Promotion: WWE
- Brand(s): Raw; SmackDown
- Date: October 8, 2022
- City: Philadelphia, Pennsylvania
- Venue: Wells Fargo Center
- Attendance: 15,944

WWE event chronology
← Previous; Worlds Collide	Next → Halloween Havoc

Extreme Rules chronology
← Previous; 2021	Next → Final

The 2022 Extreme Rules was a professional wrestling premium live event (PLE) produced by WWE, held for wrestlers from the promotion's main roster brands, Raw and SmackDown. It was the 14th annual and final Extreme Rules event and took place on Saturday, October 8, 2022, at the Wells Fargo Center in Philadelphia, Pennsylvania. The theme of the event was that it featured various hardcore-based matches.

Six matches were contested at the event, all of which contained a hardcore stipulation. In the main event, Matt Riddle defeated Seth "Freakin" Rollins by submission in a Fight Pit match in which Daniel Cormier served as the special guest referee. In other prominent matches, Finn Bálor defeated Edge in an "I Quit" match, Ronda Rousey defeated Liv Morgan by technical submission in an Extreme Rules match to win the SmackDown Women's Championship for a second time, and in the opening bout, The Brawling Brutes (Sheamus, Ridge Holland, and Butch) defeated Imperium (Gunther, Ludwig Kaiser, and Giovanni Vinci) in a six-man tag team Good Old Fashioned Donnybrook match. The event also saw the return of Bray Wyatt, who had been released from his WWE contract in July 2021.

This was the only Extreme Rules event to be held in October and on a Saturday, as well as the second Extreme Rules event to take place at the Wells Fargo Center, after the 2019 event. This was subsequently the only Extreme Rules event to livestream on Disney+ Hotstar in Indonesia following the shutdown of its version of the WWE Network in late January, as well as the only Extreme Rules event to be branded as a "premium live event", a term the company introduced at the start of the year to refer to its events airing on traditional pay-per-view and via WWE's livestreaming platforms. Extreme Rules was discontinued in an effort to reduce some of the gimmick events so that the namesake matches could return to being the culmination of big feuds instead of something that has to be done each year because of the event, with the October 2023 slot given to a reinstated Fastlane.

The event received generally positive reviews from critics, who gave high praise to the six-man Donnybrook match and the "I Quit" match, the latter for its dark tone and ending, but felt the SmackDown Women's Championship match was the weakest of the night. They also felt that the main event's stipulation was not utilized enough. The return of Wyatt was acclaimed for its mystery, buildup, and execution. Critics also praised the variety of stipulation matches, unlike the previous year's event, which only had one hardcore-based match.

== Production ==
=== Background ===
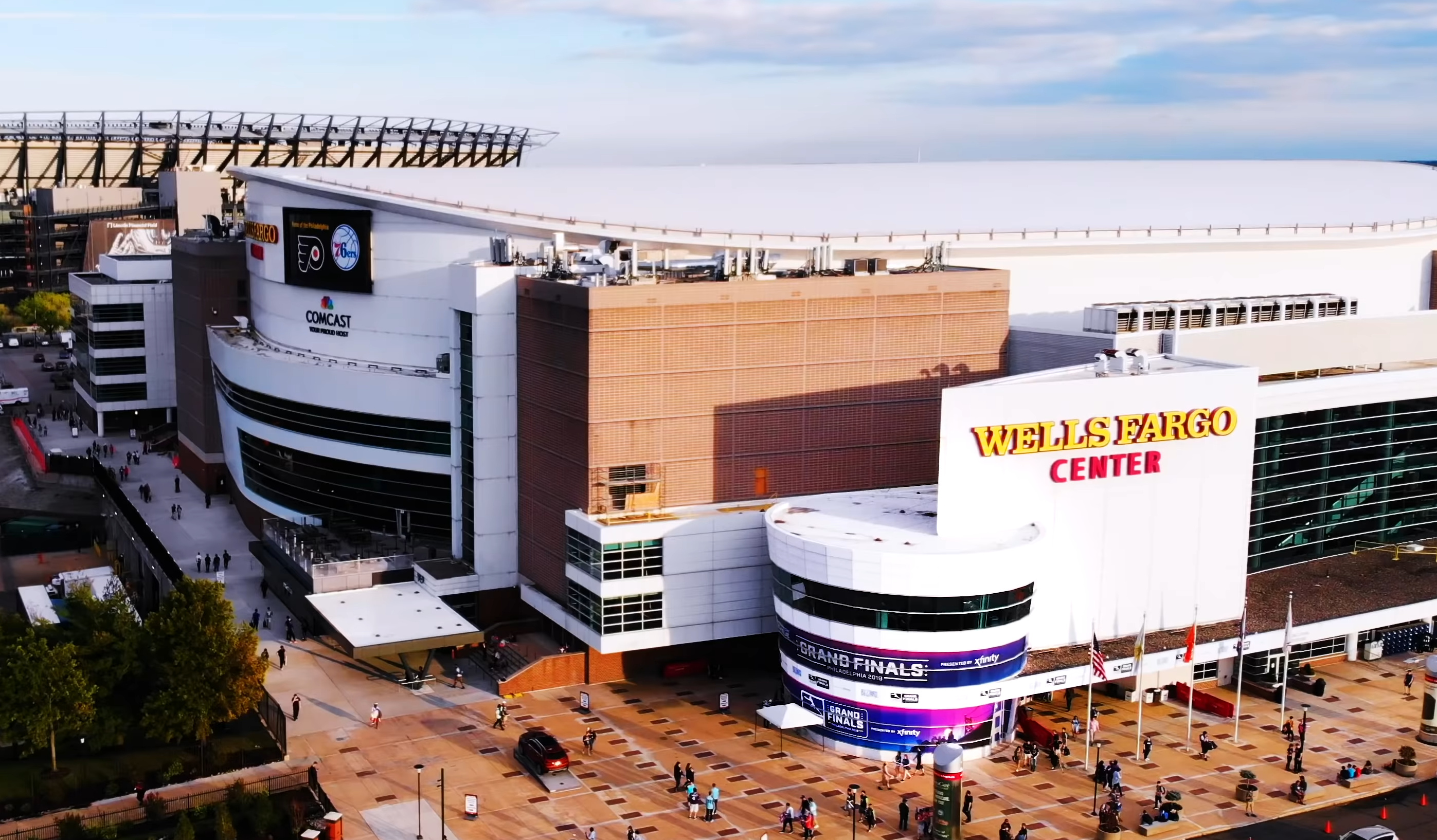
The 14th annual and final Extreme Rules was the second time for the event to be held at the Wells Fargo Center in Philadelphia, Pennsylvania, after 2019.

Extreme Rules was an annual professional wrestling premium live event (PLE) produced by WWE since 2009. It was originally broadcast exclusively via pay-per-view (PPV) before it began simulcasting on WWE's livestreaming platforms in 2014. The concept of the event was that it featured various matches that were contested under hardcore rules and generally featured one Extreme Rules match. The defunct Extreme Championship Wrestling promotion, which WWE acquired in 2003, originally used the "extreme rules" term to describe the regulations for all of its matches; WWE adopted the term, using it in place of "hardcore match" or "hardcore rules".

On October 25, 2021, WWE revealed its 2022 PLE calendar for the Raw and SmackDown brands, with a to be announced event for October. On June 13, 2022, that October slot was announced as the 14th Extreme Rules event, scheduled for Saturday, October 8, 2022, at the Wells Fargo Center in Philadelphia, Pennsylvania; Philadelphia was the home of the former ECW promotion from 1993 to 2001. This marked the first Extreme Rules to be held in October and on a Saturday, as well as the second Extreme Rules held at this venue, after the 2019 event. Tickets went on sale on July 15. This was also the first Extreme Rules event to be branded as a "premium live event", a term the company introduced on January 1 to refer to its events that are available on PPV and via livestreaming.

=== Broadcast outlets ===
The PLE was broadcast on traditional PPV outlets worldwide. It was also available to livestream on Peacock in the United States, SonyLIV in India, Disney+ Hotstar in Indonesia, and the WWE Network everywhere else. This was the first Extreme Rules to livestream on Disney+ Hotstar in Indonesia, following the shutdown of its version of the WWE Network in late January.

=== Storylines ===
The event included six matches that resulted from scripted storylines. Results were predetermined by WWE's writers on the Raw and SmackDown brands, while storylines were produced on WWE's weekly television shows, Monday Night Raw and Friday Night SmackDown.

At Clash at the Castle, Seth "Freakin" Rollins defeated Matt Riddle. During Rollins's match for the United States Championship on the September 19 episode of Raw, Riddle distracted Rollins, costing him the title. Later that episode, Riddle challenged Rollins to a Fight Pit match at Extreme Rules and Rollins accepted. On October 1, it was revealed that Ultimate Fighting Championship Hall of Famer Daniel Cormier would be the special guest referee for the match.

At SummerSlam, Liv Morgan defeated Ronda Rousey to controversially retain the SmackDown Women's Championship; Rousey had Morgan in the armbar submission while Rousey's shoulders were on the mat and the referee counted a pin, but did not see Morgan tap out before the three count. Following the match, an irate Rousey attacked both Morgan and the referee, which resulted in the suspension of Rousey. After her suspension was lifted, Rousey won a fatal five-way elimination match on the September 9 episode of SmackDown to earn a rematch against Morgan for the SmackDown Women's Championship at Extreme Rules. The following week, Morgan decided that she wanted to defend the title against Rousey in an Extreme Rules match and Rousey accepted.

In early August, Karrion Kross and his wife Scarlett made their return to WWE and immediately began to target Drew McIntyre. Over the following weeks, Kross continued to attack McIntyre, but he would retreat before McIntyre could retaliate. On the September 23 episode of SmackDown, McIntyre announced that WWE officials granted him a match against Kross at Extreme Rules in a strap match, thus ensuring that Kross could not retreat.

After Bianca Belair retained the Raw Women's Championship at SummerSlam, she was confronted by a returning Bayley, accompanied by Dakota Kai and Iyo Sky. The trio would dub themselves as Damage CTRL. At Clash at the Castle, Damage CTRL defeated Belair's team in a six-woman tag team match in which Bayley pinned Belair. Due to pinning the champion, Bayley challenged Belair to a ladder match for the Raw Women's Championship at Extreme Rules, and Belair accepted.

After WrestleMania 38 in April, Edge formed a group with Damian Priest called The Judgment Day; Rhea Ripley later joined the group at WrestleMania Backlash, followed by Finn Bálor, who was defeated in a match by Judgment Day. Bálor would then become the new leader after Judgement Day viciously attacked and turned on Edge. Dominik Mysterio would also later join the group after turning on his father Rey Mysterio and Edge at Clash at the Castle. After weeks of feuding and a brutal attack on Edge by The Judgment Day, Edge returned on the September 26 episode of Raw and challenged Bálor to an "I Quit" match at Extreme Rules, and Bálor accepted.

At Clash at the Castle, Gunther (accompanied by Ludwig Kaiser and Giovanni Vinci) defeated Sheamus (accompanied by Butch and Ridge Holland) to retain the Intercontinental Championship. Imperium (Gunther, Kaiser, and Vinci) then defeated The Brawling Brutes (Sheamus, Butch, and Holland) in a six-man tag team match on the following episode of SmackDown. The following week, Butch and Holland won a fatal four-way tag team match, also involving Kaiser and Vinci, to earn a match for the Undisputed WWE Tag Team Championship on the next episode, but failed to win the titles due to Imperium interfering. On September 29, a six-man tag team Good Old Fashioned Donnybrook match between the two teams was confirmed to take place at Extreme Rules.

In September, WWE began playing an a cappella version of "White Rabbit" by Jefferson Airplane at live events and during commercial breaks of televised shows, while also hiding QR codes in various locations on episodes of Raw and SmackDown. Each code led to special websites containing imagery, mini-games, and riddles that were all seemingly connected to Extreme Rules.

== Event ==
Other on-screen personnel
Role:	Name:
English commentators	Michael Cole
English commentators	Corey Graves
Spanish commentators	Marcelo Rodriguez
Spanish commentators	Jerry Soto
Ring announcers	Mike Rome (Raw)
Ring announcers	Samantha Irvin (SmackDown)
Referees	Danilo Anfibio
Referees	Jason Ayers
Referees	Jessika Carr
Referees	Daniel Cormier
Referees	Dan Engler
Referees	Chad Patton
Interviewer	Megan Morant
Pre-show panel	Kevin Patrick
Pre-show panel	Booker T
Pre-show panel	Jerry Lawler
Pre-show panel	Peter Rosenberg

No matches took place on the Extreme Rules Kickoff pre-show, however, WWE Hall of Famer Jerry Lawler, along with the Philadelphia Eagles Cheerleaders and the mascot of the Philadelphia 76ers, Franklin the Dog, came out and revealed the logo of WrestleMania XL, scheduled for Philadelphia at the nearby Lincoln Financial Field in April 2024.

=== Preliminary matches ===
The event opened with The Brawling Brutes (Sheamus, Ridge Holland, and Butch) facing Imperium (Gunther, Ludwig Kaiser, and Giovanni Vinci) in a six-man tag team Good Old Fashioned Donnybrook match. During the match, Imperium dominated The Brawling Brutes. Imperium later isolated Butch by taking out Sheamus and Holland, however, Sheamus later recovered, took out Vinci and Kaiser, and then proceeded to brawl with Gunther in the ring. Holland and Butch later recovered and joined Sheamus into viciously attacking Gunther. Sheamus performed a Brogue Kick on Gunther, however, Vinci voided the pin attempt. As Sheamus then applied the Cloverleaf on Gunther, Kaiser attacked Sheamus with a shillelagh. Butch performed a reversed springboard from atop a barrel onto Kaiser, Vinci, and Holland. Gunther attacked Sheamus with a shillelagh for a nearfall. In the closing moments, Holland and Butch attacked Kaiser and Vinci with shillelaghs while Sheamus performed a Celtic Cross on Gunther through an announce table. Butch and Holland then held Vinci in place allowing Sheamus to perform a Brogue Kick on Vinci to win the match.

Backstage, while The Miz was interviewed regarding the attacks and home invasion by Dexter Lumis (who had been stalking Miz for weeks), he was distracted by Gritty, the mascot of the Philadelphia Flyers of the National Hockey League (the Wells Fargo Center is their home). Gritty then handed an Extreme Rules shirt to Miz, however, Miz dropped and stomped on the shirt before departing.

Next, Liv Morgan defended the SmackDown Women's Championship against Ronda Rousey in an Extreme Rules match. Rousey prevented Morgan from reaching a baseball bat that was near the ring post. Morgan then retrieved the bat and attempted to strike Rousey with it, however, Rousey fended Morgan off. Rousey later obtained the bat and attempted to strike Morgan, however, Morgan sprayed a fire extinguisher on Rousey. Rousey then recovered and dominated Morgan. Morgan then retrieved the bat to finally use on Rousey only for Rousey to strike Morgan with a black belt. Morgan then attacked Rousey with a chair and performed a Code Red on Rousey using the chair for a nearfall. In the climax, Morgan performed a senton on Rousey through a table for another nearfall. Rousey then applied an armbar on Morgan, who lifted Rousey up and slammed her onto the edge of the broken table. Rousey then applied what commentator Michael Cole called a "biceps crusher" on Morgan, who passed out, to win the title for a second time.

After that, Drew McIntyre faced Karrion Kross (accompanied by Scarlett) in a Strap match. The referee fastened the strap around McIntyre's wrist, however, Kross refused, and with assistance from Scarlett, Kross attacked McIntyre before the match could officially began. The two fought into the crowd before making it back to ringside. Back in the ring, McIntyre fastened the strap around Kross' wrist, thus the match officially began. McIntyre viciously attacked and taunted Kross, however, Scarlett distracted McIntyre. Kross took advantage and attacked McIntyre. In the end, as McIntyre attempted to perform a Claymore Kick on Kross, Scarlett stood in front of McIntyre and incapacitated McIntyre with pepper spray. Kross then performed the Kross Hammer on a blinded McIntyre to win the match.

In another backstage segment, while The Miz was on a phone call, Gritty appeared and taunted Miz again, who departed once again.

In the fourth match, Bianca Belair defended the Raw Women's Champion against Bayley in a ladder match. Midway through, Belair performed a Kiss of Death on Bayley. As Belair ascended the ladder, Bayley's Damage CTRL stablemates, Dakota Kai and Iyo Sky, ran out and attacked Belair. Belair fended both off and performed a double Kiss of Death on Sky and Kai. Afterwards, Bayley placed another ladder over the middle rope and performed a Rose Plant on Belair onto it. As Bayley was ascending the ladder, Belair lifted it up, causing Bayley to fall onto the ropes. Bayley then used Belair's ponytail to send her into the ladder and attempted to retrieve the title belt, but Belair recovered and attacked Bayley with her ponytail. Belair then performed a Kiss of Death on Bayley on a piece of a ladder, which Bayley held onto. Belair then ascended the ladder to unhook the belt and retain the title.

In the penultimate match, Edge faced Finn Bálor in an "I Quit" match. Mid-way through the match, Edge and Bálor fought in the crowd where Edge attacked Bálor with a hockey stick and then applied a Crossface on Bálor atop the kickoff podium table; Bálor refused to quit. The two eventually brawled back to the ring, where Bálor attacked the ribs of Edge with a chair. Bálor repeatedly attacked Edge with the chair, who refused to quit. As Bálor attempted to throw Edge into a chair wedged in the corner, Edge countered and sent Bálor in the chair instead. Edge attacked Bálor with the chair repeatedly and applied the Edgecator on Bálor, however, Damian Priest ran out for the save. Dominik Mysterio, Edge's former friend, also joined the fray, and Edge performed a Spear on Bálor, who fell onto Dominik and Priest. As Edge was preparing to perform another spear on Bálor, Rhea Ripley appeared and handcuffed Edge to the top ring rope. With Ripley taunting Edge with the key, The Judgment Day (Bálor, Priest, and Dominik) then beat down a defenseless Edge. Bálor then attacked Edge with a kendo stick, however, Rey Mysterio came out wielding a chair for the save only for his son, Dominik, to attack his father Rey. Edge's wife Beth Phoenix then appeared to assist Edge and attacked Priest and Bálor with a kendo stick. A standoff ensued between Phoenix and Ripley which lead to a brawl between the two and Phoenix performing a Spear on Ripley. Phoenix retrieved the key and freed Edge who then performed a Spear on Priest and a low blow on Dominik. Edge performed three Spears on Bálor while signaling Phoenix to retrieve a chair, however, Ripley struck Phoenix with brass knuckles. Bálor then performed three Coup de Grâces on Edge, who refused to quit. Ripley then positioned Phoenix for a Con-chair-to and Edge reluctantly proclaimed "I Quit" to save Phoenix, thus Bálor won the match. Following the match, despite Bálor winning, Ripley still performed the Con-chair-to on Phoenix. Referees, WWE backstage personnel, and Rey, who later recovered, then tended to Edge and Phoenix.

In a final backstage segment, Miz tried to enter Triple H's office, however, Gritty appeared once again and taunted Miz. Miz snapped and attacked Gritty, however, Dexter Lumis, appeared behind Miz and applied a chokehold on Miz. Lumis then assisted Gritty to his feet, who kicked Miz before walking away with Lumis.

=== Main event ===
In the main event, Matt Riddle fought Seth "Freakin" Rollins in a Fight Pit match with Daniel Cormier as the special guest referee. The match started with Riddle brawling with Rollins and slamming him into the cage walls. As Cormier tried to restore order, Riddle accidentally punched at Cormier, who warned Riddle not to fight with him. Rollins took advantage of the distraction and attacked Riddle with vicious knee strikes. Riddle performed a Triangle submission on Rollins who poked the eye of Riddle. Rollins then threw Riddle face first into the steel cage wall. As Cormier checked on Riddle, Rollins shoved Cormier who then also warned Rollins not to touch him. Both eventually climbed to the elevated platform around the top of the cage where Riddle performed an RKO on Rollins, who rolled off the platform and fell down in the ring. Riddle then performed a Broton splash from the elevated platform on Rollins, who was laying in the ring. In the end, Riddle applied the triangle submission on Rollins, who tried to break the hold by hoisting Riddle up and slamming him into the cage walls and on the mat, but Riddle would not let go of the hold, causing Rollins to tap out, thus Riddle won the match.

As Riddle celebrated on stage with Cormier, the lights in the arena went out, signaling that the "White Rabbit" mystery was about to be revealed. A voice was then heard singing the verse, "He's got the whole world in his hands" repeatedly as real life versions of the Firefly Fun House characters were shown in the crowd throughout the arena, including Huskus the Pig Boy, Mercy the Buzzard, Ramblin' Rabbit, Abby the Witch, a burnt Fiend mask that was atop the announce table, and The Fiend himself. A door was shown on the stage and a distorted video on the TitanTron played, depicting a dilapidated Firefly Fun House set together with a distorted version of the Firefly Fun House theme song playing in the background. The television set inside the Fun House turned on and a masked figure, together with distorted imagery, appeared asking twice "who killed the world?" and answering "you did" then changing the answer to "we did". Back in the arena, the door opened showing a bright blue illuminating light. The masked figure then walked out, carrying a lantern and unmasked to reveal himself as Bray Wyatt and proclaimed "I'm here" before blowing out the lantern and ending the event with a picture of Wyatt's new logo; a Hawk moth with a red circle around it. This was Wyatt's first appearance since his release from his WWE contract in July 2021.

== Reception ==
The event received generally mixed to positive reviews from critics, who praised the six-man Donnybrook match and the "I Quit" match, the latter for its dark tone and ending, along with Michael Cole's commentary during the match, while the SmackDown Women's Championship match was criticized as the weakest of the event and the Strap match was also criticized. The main event was moderately praised, with most feeling that more could have been done with the stipulation. The return of Bray Wyatt, however, was universally acclaimed for its mystery, buildup, and execution. Critics also praised the variety of stipulation matches, unlike the previous year's event, which only had one hardcore-based match.

Dave Meltzer rated the "I Quit" Match and The Donnybrook match 4.5 stars, the highest rated matches of the night. He rated the SmackDown Women's Championship match 2 stars, the lowest of the night. Other ratings include the main event receiving 3.75 stars, the ladder match received 3.5 stars, and the strap match received 3.25 stars.

== Aftermath ==
This would be the final Extreme Rules event, as an event was not scheduled for 2023, with that year's October slot given to a reinstated Fastlane. This came after WWE Chief Content Officer Paul "Triple H" Levesque stated that he wanted to discontinue some of the gimmick events so that the matches could return to being the culmination of big feuds instead of something that has to be done each year because of the event.

=== Raw ===
On the following episode of Raw, Damage CTRL (Bayley, Dakota Kai, and Iyo Sky) vowed that the next time Bayley faced Bianca Belair for the Raw Women's Championship, she would win the title. Later, after Bayley lost to Candice LeRae, Kai and Sky ran out and attacked LeRae. Belair came out for the save but was outnumbered by Damage CTRL. Bayley would earn another match for the Raw Women's Championship by defeating Belair in a non-title match on the October 24 episode after interference from Nikki Cross, who ditched the Nikki A.S.H. persona. The title rematch was scheduled for Crown Jewel and stipulated as a Last Woman Standing match.

Also on Raw, Seth "Freakin" Rollins won the United States Championship, and was later scheduled to defend the title against Matt Riddle on the following week's episode. Rollins retained due to an accidental distraction by the returning Elias.

Also on the following Raw, a match was booked for the following week between The Miz and Dexter Lumis with an added stipulation that if Lumis won, he would get a WWE contract, however, if Miz won, then Lumis would be banned from WWE. However, the match did not occur as Miz attacked Lumis with a steel chair during the latter's entrance, thus preventing Lumis from competing. The match eventually occurred on the November 28 episode of Raw as an Anything Goes match, where Lumis was victorious.

Edge made his first appearance since Extreme Rules at the Royal Rumble on January 28, 2023. He eliminated Judgment Day members Damian Priest and Finn Bálor, but as he tried to eliminate Dominik Mysterio, Priest and Bálor eliminated him. Afterwards, Edge brawled with Judgment Day on the entrance aisle, and Rhea Ripley got involved, only for Beth Phoenix to lay her out. On the February 6 episode of Raw, Edge and Phoenix challenged Bálor and Ripley to a mixed tag team match at Elimination Chamber, and Bálor accepted.

=== SmackDown ===
On the following episode of SmackDown, Karrion Kross was involved in a car accident while arriving to the arena. Medical personnel tended to Kross, only for Drew McIntyre to appear and viciously attack Kross. WWE officials appeared and separated the two while McIntyre proclaimed that their rivalry was not over. A rematch between the two was scheduled as a Steel Cage match at Crown Jewel, which McIntyre won to end the feud.

Also on the following SmackDown, Sheamus competed in a fatal four-way match to earn another opportunity at Gunther's Intercontinental Championship. However, the match was won by Rey Mysterio, who was officially transferred to the SmackDown roster, as he did not want to fight his son Dominik on Raw.

Also on the following SmackDown, Bray Wyatt made his return to the SmackDown brand (prior to his release, he was a member of the Raw roster). Speaking as his real self, he talked about the past year in which he was fired and lost loved ones and then thanked the fans for saving him. Before he could continue, the lights went out and Wyatt's new masked character appeared on the TitanTron, telling viewers to forget the past and warning of what was to come. The following week, Wyatt apologized for the interruption and then finished what he was going to say the previous week. He confessed that he had various issues, that he would do very bad things, and that he was now a servant and would follow wherever the circle takes him. Wyatt's return would be tragically cut short, as after only one televised match at the Royal Rumble in January, he went on a medical hiatus the following month due to contracting COVID-19, which exacerbated an existing heart issue, and he unexpectedly died of a heart attack in August; the week prior to his death, it was reported that he was closing in on a return.

== Results ==
No.	Results	Stipulations	Times
1	The Brawling Brutes (Sheamus, Ridge Holland, and Butch) defeated Imperium (Gunther, Ludwig Kaiser, and Giovanni Vinci) by pinfall	Six-man tag team Good Old Fashioned Donnybrook match	17:50
2	Ronda Rousey defeated Liv Morgan (c) by technical submission	Extreme Rules match for the WWE SmackDown Women's Championship	12:05
3	Karrion Kross (with Scarlett) defeated Drew McIntyre by pinfall	Strap match	10:20
4	Bianca Belair (c) defeated Bayley by retrieving the championship belt	Ladder match for the WWE Raw Women's Championship	16:40
5	Finn Bálor defeated Edge by making Edge say "I quit"	"I Quit" match	29:55
6	Matt Riddle defeated Seth "Freakin" Rollins by submission	Fight Pit match Daniel Cormier was the special guest referee.	16:35
(c) / – the champion(s) heading into the match
