= Crown Jewel (2022) =

WWE premium live event

Crown Jewel جوهرة التاج (Arabic)
- Promotional poster featuring Roman Reigns and Logan Paul
- Promotion: WWE
- Brand(s): Raw; SmackDown
- Date: November 5, 2022
- City: Riyadh, Saudi Arabia
- Venue: Mrsool Park

WWE event chronology
← Previous; Halloween Havoc	Next → Survivor Series: WarGames

WWE in Saudi Arabia chronology
← Previous; Elimination Chamber	Next → Night of Champions

Crown Jewel chronology
← Previous; 2021	Next → 2023

The 2022 Crown Jewel (Arabic: جوهرة التاج, romanized: jawharat altaaji) was a professional wrestling premium live event (PLE) produced by the American company WWE, held for wrestlers from the promotion's main roster brands, Raw and SmackDown. It was the fourth Crown Jewel and took place on Saturday, November 5, 2022, at Mrsool Park in Riyadh, Saudi Arabia. The event was held as part of the city's annual Riyadh Season festivities and aired live at 7:00 p.m. Arabia Standard Time (12:00 p.m. Eastern Time).

This was the eighth event that WWE held in Saudi Arabia under a 10-year partnership in support of Saudi Vision 2030. It was also the second Crown Jewel to be held at Mrsool Park, after the inaugural 2018 event when it was known as the King Saud University Stadium (renamed in 2020). This was also the first Crown Jewel to be branded as a "premium live event", a term the company introduced at the start of the year to refer to its events airing on traditional pay-per-view and via WWE's livestreaming platforms. It would also be the first Crown Jewel to livestream on Disney+ Hotstar in Indonesia, following the shutdown of its version of the WWE Network in late January, and it was WWE's final PLE to air on the WWE Network in the Philippines before it transferred to Disney+ on November 17.

Eight matches were contested at the event. In the main event, Roman Reigns defeated Logan Paul to retain the Undisputed WWE Universal Championship, which also saw an appearance by Logan's brother Jake Paul. In other prominent matches, Braun Strowman defeated Omos, Damage CTRL (Dakota Kai and Iyo Sky) defeated Alexa Bliss and Asuka to win the WWE Women's Tag Team Championship, Bianca Belair defeated Bayley in a Last Woman Standing match to retain the Raw Women's Championship, and in the opening bout, Brock Lesnar defeated Bobby Lashley.

The event received overwhelming acclaim, with fans and critics praising the main event for Logan Paul's wrestling skills and his efforts to wrestle after suffering an injury halfway through the match. The Last Woman Standing match was also praised for its creativity. The Women's Tag Team Championship match and the Steel Cage match were also well received.

== Production ==
=== Background ===
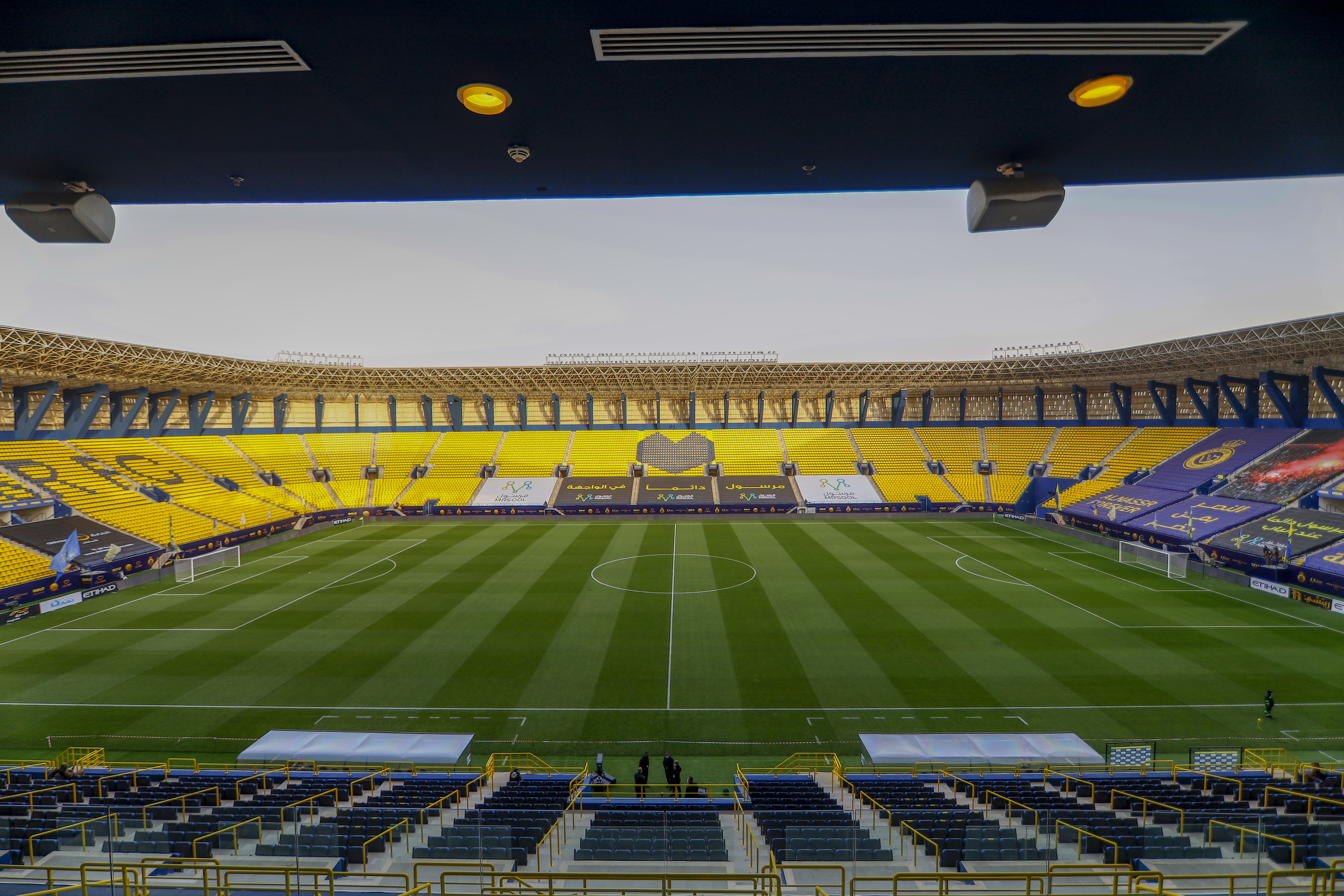
The fourth Crown Jewel was the second time for the event to be held at Mrsool Park in Riyadh, Saudi Arabia, after 2018 when it was referred to as King Saud University Stadium.

Crown Jewel is a professional wrestling premium live event (PLE) produced by the American company WWE since 2018, held in late October–early November in Riyadh, Saudi Arabia. It has been held every year since, except in 2020 due to the COVID-19 pandemic, and it is held as part of the city's annual Riyadh Season festivities, which began in 2019. It is the main recurring event held as part of a 10-year strategic multiplatform partnership with the Ministry of Sport (formerly General Sports Authority) in support of Saudi Vision 2030, Saudi Arabia's social and economic reform program, a partnership that began in early 2018.

Announced on May 23, 2022, the fourth Crown Jewel, and eighth overall event in the Saudi Arabian partnership, was scheduled to take place on Saturday, November 5, 2022, at Mrsool Park, marking the second Crown Jewel to take place at this venue, after the inaugural 2018 event when it was known as King Saud University Stadium (renamed in 2020). The event featured wrestlers from the Raw and SmackDown brand divisions. This was also the first Crown Jewel to be branded as a "premium live event", a term the company introduced on January 1 to refer to its events that are available on pay-per-view (PPV) and via livestreaming.

=== Broadcast outlets ===
The PLE was broadcast on traditional PPV outlets worldwide. It was also available to livestream on Peacock in the United States, SonyLIV in India, Disney+ Hotstar in Indonesia, and the WWE Network everywhere else. This was the first Crown Jewel to livestream on Disney+ Hotstar in Indonesia, following the shutdown of its version of the WWE Network in late January. This would also be WWE's final PLE to livestream on the WWE Network in the Philippines, as on October 21, it was announced that The Walt Disney Company and WWE inked a deal to make Disney+ its exclusive home for WWE Network in the Philippines, which began on November 17. With the event being held in Saudi Arabia, it aired live at 7:00 p.m. Arabia Standard Time (12:00 p.m. Eastern Time).

=== Iranian attack concerns ===
On November 1, 2022, The Wall Street Journal reported that Saudi Arabia may be subject to a targeted attack by Iran's Islamic Revolutionary Guard Corps amid the Mahsa Amini protests simultaneously taking place. The article stated that the attacks were planned for "targets in the kingdom". This brought concern regarding Crown Jewel that upcoming weekend. PWInsider reported that WWE would be going forward with the event and that the company had security protocols and emergency contingencies in place if something were to happen, but were hopeful that there would be no issues. On November 2, Iran denied that they were planning any attack.

=== Storylines ===
The event included eight matches that resulted from scripted storylines. Results were predetermined by WWE's writers on the Raw and SmackDown brands, while storylines were produced on WWE's weekly television shows, Monday Night Raw and Friday Night SmackDown.

==== Main event match ====
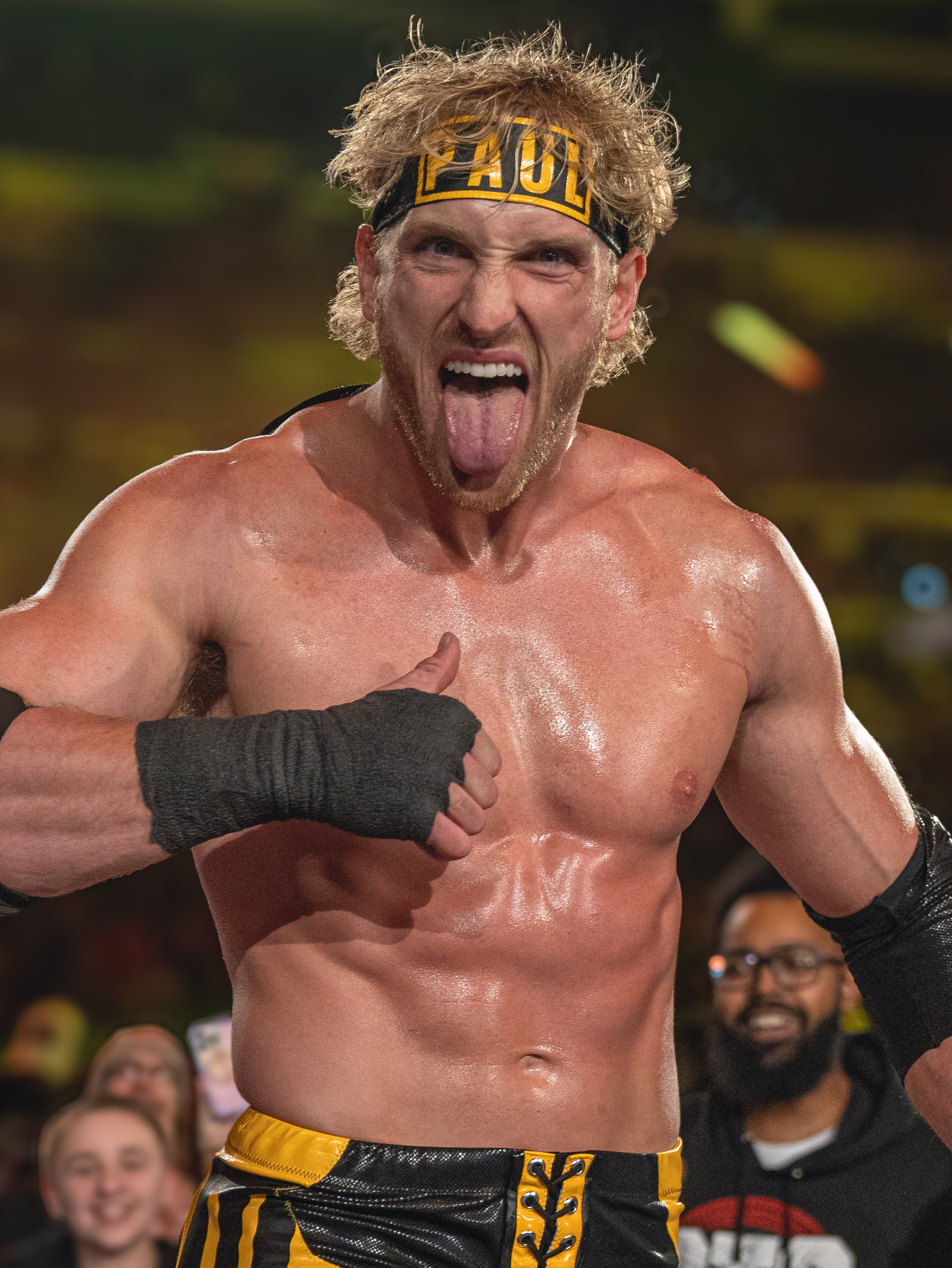
In only his third WWE match, social media influencer Logan Paul challenged for the Undisputed WWE Universal Championship in the main event.

After Roman Reigns appeared on Logan Paul's podcast Impaulsive, the social media influencer then trash-talked Reigns after the latter left the set. This led to a social media exchange, resulting in Paul appearing on the September 16 episode of SmackDown where he confronted The Bloodline to invite Reigns to a press conference in Las Vegas the following day. At the conference, WWE executive Paul "Triple H" Levesque announced that Reigns would defend the Undisputed WWE Universal Championship against Paul in the main event of Crown Jewel, marking only Paul's third match in WWE. During the Crown Jewel press conference the day before the event, it was confirmed that while Reigns would have The Bloodline in his corner (except Sami Zayn), (Note: Due to strained Saudi Arabia–Syria relations amid the Syrian civil war, Sami Zayn did not participate in WWE's Saudi Arabian events at that time as he is of Syrian descent.) Paul would be backed by his brother Jake Paul.

==== Undercard matches ====
On the October 10 episode of Raw, The Judgment Day (Finn Bálor, Damian Priest, Dominik Mysterio, and Rhea Ripley) called out AJ Styles to join their stable, as Styles and Bálor used to be teammates in the Bullet Club in New Japan Pro-Wrestling. Styles came out to seemingly accept the offer, however, he rejected and introduced the returning Luke Gallows and Karl Anderson as backup, making their return to WWE after both were released in April 2020, thus reforming The O.C. A brawl then ensued between the two teams. The following week, The Judgment Day confronted The O.C. and challenged them to a six-man tag team match at Crown Jewel, which the latter accepted.

On the October 10 episode of Raw, Bobby Lashley listed off the names of previous wrestlers he had defeated, which included Brock Lesnar, who he faced only once and defeated at the Royal Rumble in January. Lesnar, in his first appearance since SummerSlam in July, then made a surprise return and attacked Lashley. This ultimately cost Lashley his United States Championship in a title defense that occurred right after the confrontation. Later backstage, Lashley challenged Lesnar to face him on the following week's episode. There, the two brawled which ended after Lashley put Lesnar through the commentators table. Later that night, a match between the two was announced for Crown Jewel.

At Extreme Rules, Karrion Kross defeated Drew McIntyre in a strap match after Kross's wife, Scarlett, incapacitated McIntyre with pepper spray. On the following episode of SmackDown, Kross was scheduled to compete in a fatal four-way match to determine the number one contender for the Intercontinental Championship. However, before SmackDown went on air, Kross was involved in a car accident (kayfabe) and was attacked by McIntyre while receiving help, rendering him unable to compete. The following week, McIntyre announced that he would be facing Kross in a Steel Cage match at Crown Jewel.

During Braun Strowman's match on the October 14 episode of SmackDown, Omos and his manager MVP of the Raw brand appeared in the crowd. After Strowman won the match, MVP explained that they took issue with Strowman's claim of calling himself the "Monster of all Monsters" and claimed that Strowman would look normal sized if he stood next to Omos. The following week, Strowman called out Omos to confront him. MVP came out instead and Strowman stated that he wanted to challenge Omos at Crown Jewel; MVP then accepted on his behalf, however, Omos then came out and towered over Strowman before shoving him out of the ring. The match was officially confirmed on the October 24 episode of Raw.

At Extreme Rules, Bianca Belair defeated Bayley in a Ladder match to retain the Raw Women's Championship. On the October 24 episode of Raw, Bayley defeated Belair in a non-title match after interference from Nikki Cross, who ditched the Nikki A.S.H. persona. Due to this, Bayley earned another title match against Belair, which was scheduled for Crown Jewel and stipulated as a Last Woman Standing match.

On the October 14 episode of SmackDown, Sheamus and Solo Sikoa competed in a fatal four-way match to earn an opportunity at the Intercontinental Championship. During the match, Bloodline members Sami Zayn and Jey Uso interfered on Sikoa's behalf. The Brawling Brutes (Ridge Holland and Butch) then came out to defend their stablemate, Sheamus, and a brawl broke out between the two teams. The following week, The Bloodline attacked and injured Sheamus. After defeating Zayn and Sikoa on the October 28 episode, Holland and Butch earned a match against The Usos (Jey Uso and Jimmy Uso) for the Undisputed WWE Tag Team Championship at Crown Jewel.

After being absent for a few weeks due to an attack by Damage CTRL (Bayley, Dakota Kai, and Iyo Sky), Alexa Bliss and Asuka made their return on the October 31 episode of Raw. That night, they challenged Sky and Kai to a match for the WWE Women's Tag Team Championship and defeated them to win the titles. The next day, a championship rematch was scheduled for Crown Jewel.

During the October 31 episode of Raw, it was announced that Bray Wyatt would be making an appearance at Crown Jewel. Wyatt had been released from WWE in July 2021 and made his return to the company at Extreme Rules. Since his return, he had made cryptic promos about his future, while also being haunted by a figure from his past named Uncle Howdy, who first appeared on the October 28 episode of SmackDown.

== Event ==
Other on-screen personnel
Role:	Name:
English commentators	Michael Cole
English commentators	Wade Barrett
Arabic commentators	Faisal Al-Mughaisib
Arabic commentators	Jude Aldajani
Ring announcer	Mike Rome
Referees	Danilo Anfibio
Referees	Jessika Carr
Referees	Dan Engler
Referees	Daphanie LaShaunn
Referees	Ryan Tran
Pre-show panel	Jackie Redmond
Pre-show panel	Matt Camp
Pre-show panel	Peter Rosenberg

=== Preliminary matches ===
The PLE opened with Bobby Lashley facing Brock Lesnar. During Lesnar's entrance, Lashley shoved Lesnar into the steel steps, who injured his knee. Lashley performed a spear on Lesnar, threw Lesnar back into the ring, after which, the bell rang to officially start the match. After the match officially began, Lashley performed a spear on Lesnar, who rolled out of the ring and hobbled at ringside. Lashley performed a third spear on Lesnar through the barricade. Lashley performed a fourth spear on Lesnar for a near fall. As Lashley tried to apply the Hurt Lock on Lesnar, Lesnar countered and performed three German Suplexes and an F-5 on Lashley for a near fall. Lashley then dominated Lesnar, however, Lesnar attempted a second F-5 only for Lashley to perform a spinebuster. In the closing moments, Lashley applied the Hurt Lock on Lesnar, who appeared to fade, however, Lesnar kicked the turnbuckle to break the hold. Lashley still kept the Hurt Lock applied, however, Lesnar landed on top of Lashley, and as Lashley's shoulders were on the mat, the referee counted the pin, thus Lesnar won the match. Following the match, an incensed Lashley applied the Hurt Lock on Lesnar.

Next, Alexa Bliss and Asuka defended the WWE Women's Tag Team Championship against Damage CTRL (Dakota Kai and Iyo Sky). In the climax, as Bliss attempted Twisted Bliss on Kai, Nikki Cross appeared and performed a twisting neckbreaker on Bliss while the referee was distracted by Asuka and Sky. Kai then pinned Bliss to win the titles.

After that, Drew McIntyre faced Karrion Kross (accompanied by Scarlett) in a Steel Cage match. During the match, as McIntyre attempted to escape from the cage's door, Scarlett incapacitated McIntyre and the referee with pepper spray. Kross then took advantage and attempted to escape, however, McIntyre applied the ankle lock on Kross to prevent Kross from escaping. Scarlett then locked the door to prevent McIntyre from escaping. However, McIntyre started to climb the cage in order to escape. Scarlett quickly opened the door to allow Kross to escape, however, McIntyre was able to escape the cage before Kross did, thus McIntyre won the match.

In the fourth match, The Judgment Day (Finn Bálor, Damian Priest, and Dominik Mysterio, accompanied by Rhea Ripley) faced The O.C. (AJ Styles, Luke Gallows, and Karl Anderson). In the closing moments, as Styles attempted for the Phenomenal Forearm on Bálor, Ripley lifted Styles onto her shoulders and threw Styles face first onto the ring apron. Bálor performed the Coup De Grâce on Styles to win the match.

The next match saw Braun Strowman face Omos. Omos won a test of strength at the start of the match and began to dominate Strowman. Omos performed two powerslams on Strowman, both times were near falls. Strowman mounted a comeback and attempted the Strowman Freight Train on Omos, however, Omos stopped Strowman. In the closing moments, Omos charged towards Strowman, who was at the corner only for Strowman to move and perform a powerslam on Omos to win the match.

Next, The Usos (Jey Uso and Jimmy Uso) defended the Undisputed WWE Tag Team Championship against The Brawling Brutes (Ridge Holland and Butch). In the end, The Usos performed a 1D on Butch from the top rope to retain the titles.

In the penultimate match, Bianca Belair defended the Raw Women's Championship against Bayley in a Last Woman Standing match. This was the first women's championship match contested in Saudi Arabia with a stipulation. During the match, Bayley pulled a table from under the ring and attempted a suplex on Belair, but Belair countered and suplexed Bayley on the entrance ramp. Bayley then attacked Belair with a chair inside the ring and trapped her between the steel steps and the ring. Bayley then placed a ladder over the top opening, but Belair stood at a seven count. Bayley avoided being hit with the steel steps by Belair and performed a spinebuster on Belair onto the stairs, but Belair stood at a nine count. On the stage, Bayley performed a Bayley-to-Bayley suplex on Belair onto the floor, but both women stood before the ten count. Bayley then trapped Belair in an equipment case, but Belair escaped before the ten count. Bayley then applied a crossface on Belair, but released the submission to use a golf cart. Belair was able to avoid Bayley before Bayley went to the top of the golf cart. Belair then drove the golf cart back to the ring, and sent Bayley off of the cart, but Bayley slightly overshot the table. Belair then powerbombed Bayley through the table, but Bayley stood at a nine count. Belair then threw multiple chairs in the ring before slamming Bayley onto them. However, as Belair went for a 450 splash, Bayley moved out of the way, but Belair stood at a nine count. In the climax, Bayley sent Belair face first onto a chair and looked to do so again, but Belair blocked and followed up with a Kiss of Death onto the chair. Belair then trapped Bayley between a ladder and wedged it below the turnbuckle. Bayley was unable to escape before the ten count, thus Belair retained.

Before the main event, Bray Wyatt came out to address the fans. Wyatt spoke about his family and stated that he wanted to be great. Wyatt then stated that he became a monster (seemingly referring to his "Fiend" persona) and he wanted to change and rewrite his story. Wyatt was then interrupted by Uncle Howdy on the TitanTron, who stated that Wyatt would eventually give in to his inner demons and it would feel so good.

=== Main event ===
In the main event, Roman Reigns (accompanied by Paul Heyman) defended the Undisputed WWE Universal Championship against Logan Paul. During the match, Paul performed a Buckshot Lariat on Reigns for a near fall. Paul performed a crossbody and followed up with a standing moonsault for a near fall. Later, Paul cleared the Arabic announce table and placed Reigns on it. Paul then held the phone and performed a Frog Splash on Reigns through the table. Afterwards, The Usos (Jey Uso and Jimmy Uso) came out to assist Reigns and attacked Logan's Impaulsive co-hosts, Mike Majlak and George Janko, who were seated at ringside. Logan's brother Jake Paul then came out and took out The Usos. Solo Sikoa then came out to confront Jake, but The Usos emerged and Logan then took out The Usos. After Logan re-entered the ring, Reigns performed a superman punch and a spear on Paul to retain the championships.

== Reception ==
The event received overwhelming acclaim, with fans and critics praising the main event for Logan Paul's wrestling skills and his efforts to wrestle after suffering an injury halfway through the match, the Last Woman Standing match, the latter for its creativity, the Women's Tag Team Championship match, and the Steel Cage match.

Dave Meltzer gave the main event 4.5 stars, the highest rated match of the event. The Last Woman Standing match received 4.25 stars, and the opening bout received 3.5 stars. Elsewhere, The O.C. vs. Judgment Day received 3.5 stars, Braun Strowman vs. Omos received 1.5 stars, the WWE Women's Tag Team Championship match received 3.75 stars, The Usos vs. The Brawling Brutes received 3.25 stars, and the Steel Cage match received 3.75 stars.

== Aftermath ==
After the event, Logan Paul took to social media to reveal that he had suffered a torn meniscus, MCL, and potentially his ACL during his match.

=== Raw ===
On the following episode of Raw, Bianca Belair, Alexa Bliss, and Asuka declared their war was not over and challenged Damage CTRL (Bayley, Dakota Kai, and Iyo Sky) to a WarGames match at Survivor Series: WarGames. Damage CTRL accepted the challenge and subsequently recruited Nikki Cross to their team.

Also on Raw, The O.C. (AJ Styles, Luke Gallows, and Karl Anderson) confronted The Judgment Day (Finn Bálor, Damian Priest, Dominik Mysterio, and Rhea Ripley) and introduced the returning Mia Yim as their solution to deal with Ripley. The two teams brawled with The O.C. getting the upper hand. The following week, a match between Bálor and Styles was made official for Survivor Series: WarGames, with Yim also joining Bianca Belair's WarGames team and Ripley joining Damage CTRL's team.

Also on Raw, Seth "Freakin" Rollins issued an open challenge for the United States Championship, which was accepted by Bobby Lashley; however, he viciously attacked Rollins before the match. After the beat down, Austin Theory ran out and cashed in his Money in the Bank contract on a weakened Rollins; however, Rollins retained the title thanks to interference from Lashley. Two weeks later, a triple threat match between the three for the title was scheduled for Survivor Series: WarGames.

Brock Lesnar's next appearance occurred on Raw Is XXX on January 23, 2023, where he caused Bobby Lashley to lose his United States Championship match. The two then entered the men's Royal Rumble match at the titular event on January 28 where Lashley eliminated Lesnar, after which, Lesnar threw a fit at ringside and attacked a referee before leaving. On the February 6 episode, Lesnar appeared with a match contract and challenged Lashley to another match at Elimination Chamber. The contract signing for the match took place the following week, and after Lashley laid out Lesnar, he signed the contract to make the match official.

=== SmackDown ===
On the following episode of SmackDown, The Bloodline (Roman Reigns, Jey Uso, Jimmy Uso, Solo Sikoa, Sami Zayn, and Paul Heyman) addressed the fans in attendance, as well as their respective wins at Crown Jewel, only for The Brawling Brutes (Butch and Ridge Holland) to interrupt. They introduced a healed up Sheamus before engaging in a brawl with The Bloodline. Drew McIntyre joined the fray in favor of the Brutes and the brawl continued as the show ended. The following week, it was confirmed that The Brawling Brutes and McIntyre would face The Bloodline in a WarGames match at Survivor Series: WarGames. Later that night, after Butch defeated Zayn in a first round match of the SmackDown World Cup tournament, another brawl between The Bloodline and The Brawling Brutes followed, after which, Kevin Owens made his return from injury and revealed himself as the fifth member of Sheamus' team with Owens also having previous issues with The Bloodline.

== Results ==
No.	Results	Stipulations	Times
1	Brock Lesnar defeated Bobby Lashley by pinfall	Singles match	6:00
2	Damage CTRL (Dakota Kai and Iyo Sky) defeated Alexa Bliss and Asuka (c) by pinfall	Tag team match for the WWE Women's Tag Team Championship	12:50
3	Drew McIntyre defeated Karrion Kross (with Scarlett) by escaping the cage	Steel Cage match	13:00
4	The Judgment Day (Finn Bálor, Damian Priest, and Dominik Mysterio) (with Rhea Ripley) defeated The O.C. (AJ Styles, Luke Gallows, and Karl Anderson) by pinfall	Six-man tag team match	14:00
5	Braun Strowman defeated Omos by pinfall	Singles match	7:20
6	The Usos (Jey Uso and Jimmy Uso) (c) defeated The Brawling Brutes (Ridge Holland and Butch) by pinfall	Tag team match for the Undisputed WWE Tag Team Championship (Note: The name "Undisputed WWE Tag Team Championship" referred to both the Raw Tag Team Championship and SmackDown Tag Team Championship being held and defended together, although both titles remained independently active.)	10:45
7	Bianca Belair (c) defeated Bayley as Bayley was unable to make it to her feet before the referee's count of 10	Last Woman Standing match for the WWE Raw Women's Championship	20:20
8	Roman Reigns (c) (with Paul Heyman) defeated Logan Paul by pinfall	Singles match for the Undisputed WWE Universal Championship (Note: The name "Undisputed WWE Universal Championship" referred to both the WWE Championship and Universal Championship being held and defended together, although both titles remained independently active.)	24:50
(c) / – the champion(s) heading into the match
