= Elimination Chamber (2023) =

WWE premium live event

- Promotional poster featuring Montreal native Sami Zayn, Roman Reigns, and the Elimination Chamber structure
- Promotion: WWE
- Brand(s): Raw; SmackDown
- Date: February 18, 2023
- City: Montreal, Quebec, Canada
- Venue: Bell Centre
- Attendance: 17,271

WWE event chronology
← Previous; NXT Vengeance Day	Next → NXT Stand & Deliver

Elimination Chamber chronology
← Previous; 2022	Next → 2024

WWE in Canada chronology
← Previous; SummerSlam	Next → Money in the Bank

The 2023 Elimination Chamber (known as No Escape in Germany) was a professional wrestling premium live event (PLE) produced by the American company WWE, held for wrestlers from the promotion's main roster brands, Raw and SmackDown. It was the 13th Elimination Chamber event and took place on Saturday, February 18, 2023, at the Bell Centre in Montreal, Quebec, Canada. The event centered on the Elimination Chamber match, a type of roofed steel cage that surrounds the ring and ringside area with no disqualifications; the objective is to eliminate all other opponents either by pinfall or submission with championship implications at stake.

Five matches were contested at the event, including two Elimination Chamber matches. In the main event, Roman Reigns defeated Sami Zayn to retain the Undisputed WWE Universal Championship. For the event's Elimination Chamber matches, there was one each for the men and women. In the men's, which was Raw-exclusive, Austin Theory retained the United States Championship, which was the first time the title was contested in the structure, while in the women's, which was the opening bout and featured wrestlers from both Raw and SmackDown, Raw's Asuka won to earn a Raw Women's Championship match at WrestleMania 39. This also made Asuka the first woman to win the Royal Rumble, Money in the Bank, and Elimination Chamber matches.

This marked the first Elimination Chamber event to be held in Canada and the second consecutive to take place outside of the United States, after the 2022 event. It also marked WWE'a first PLE to be held in Montreal since Breaking Point in September 2009. This also marked the first Elimination Chamber to not feature a world championship being defended inside the chamber since the 2020 edition. This was also the first Elimination Chamber to livestream on Disney+ in the Philippines and Binge in Australia. The event continued WWE's streak of critical acclaim, as critics unanimously praised the execution of the main event with many deeming it a contender for WWE's match of the year. Critics also praised both Elimination Chamber matches and the Edge and Beth Phoenix vs. The Judgment Day (Finn Bálor and Rhea Ripley) mixed tag team match, but some were critical of the ending of the Brock Lesnar vs. Bobby Lashley match. Dave Meltzer of the Wrestling Observer Newsletter rated all but one match four stars or higher, with the highest rating going to the main event (4.75 stars), and the lowest to the Lesnar-Lashley match (2.25 stars).

== Production ==
=== Background ===
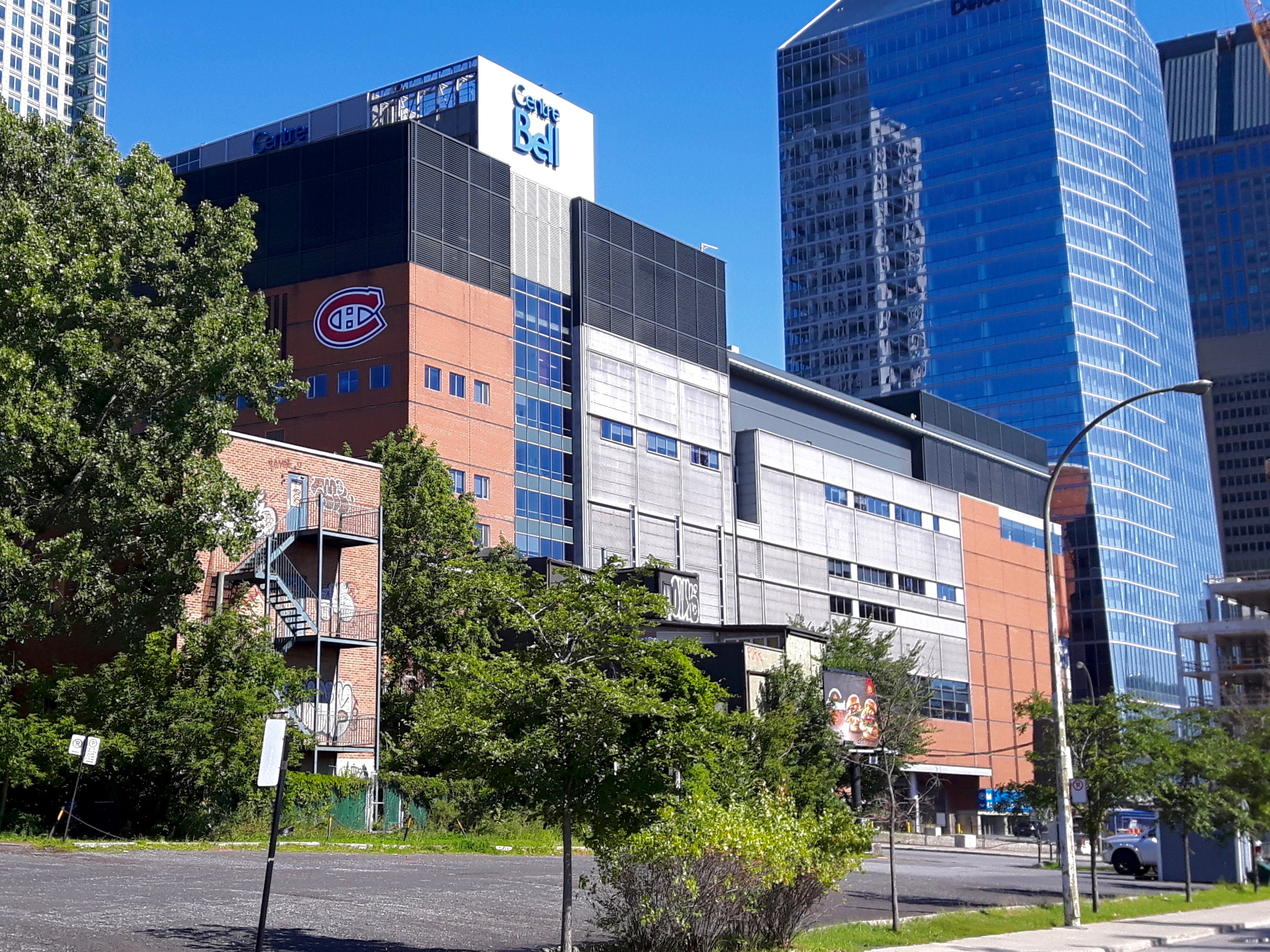
The 13th Elimination Chamber event was held at the Bell Centre in Montreal, Quebec, Canada, which was WWE's first premium live event to be held here since Breaking Point in September 2009. The arena was also the site of the infamous Montreal Screwjob which occurred at the 1997 Survivor Series.

Elimination Chamber is a professional wrestling premium live event (PLE) first produced by the American promotion WWE in 2010. It has been held every year since, except in 2016, generally in February. It was originally broadcast exclusively via pay-per-view (PPV) before it began simulcasting on WWE's livestreaming platforms in 2015. The concept of the event is that one or two main event matches are contested inside the Elimination Chamber, either with championships or future opportunities at championships at stake.

Announced on October 24, 2022, the 13th Elimination Chamber event was scheduled to take place on Saturday, February 18, 2023, at the Bell Centre in Montreal, Quebec, Canada, and featured wrestlers from the Raw and SmackDown brand divisions. This marked the first Elimination Chamber event to be held in Canada, and the second to be held outside of the United States, after the 2022 event, which was held in Saudi Arabia. This also marked WWE's first PLE to be held in Montreal since Breaking Point in September 2009. It was also announced that the February 17 episode of Friday Night SmackDown would air live from the same venue. Premium hospitality packages went on sale on October 28, 2022, before general public tickets became available on November 18.

The Elimination Chamber match is an elimination-based match contested in a type of large roofed steel cage that surrounds the wrestling ring with an elevated platform around the ring. Within the Chamber are four inner pods, one behind each ring post. The match is contested by six participants. Two wrestlers start the match, while the other four are held within each inner pod with one selected randomly to enter the match at regular intervals, which continues until all four have been released. The objective is to eliminate all other opponents by pinfall or submission, and there are no disqualifications or count-outs.

In 2011 and since 2013, the event has been promoted as "No Escape" in Germany as it was feared that the name "Elimination Chamber" may remind people of the gas chambers used during the Holocaust; it was promoted as "No Way Out" in 2010 and 2012.

=== Broadcast outlets ===
The PLE was available through traditional PPV outlets worldwide. It was also available to livestream on Peacock in the United States, SonyLIV in India, Disney+ Hotstar in Indonesia, Disney+ in the Philippines, Binge in Australia, and the WWE Network everywhere else. It was the first Elimination Chamber to livestream on Disney+ in the Philippines, following the shutdown of its version of the WWE Network in November 2022, and it was also the first Elimination Chamber to livestream on Binge in Australia after the Australian version of the WWE Network merged under Foxtel's channel Binge in January.

=== Storylines ===
The event included five matches that resulted from scripted storylines. Results were predetermined by WWE's writers on the Raw and SmackDown brands, while storylines were produced on WWE's weekly television shows, Monday Night Raw and Friday Night SmackDown.

After Roman Reigns retained the Undisputed WWE Universal Championship at the Royal Rumble, The Usos (Jey Uso and Jimmy Uso) and Solo Sikoa attacked Reigns's opponent, Kevin Owens, while honorary Bloodline member Sami Zayn watched on in uncertainty, as Owens was Zayn's former best friend. As Reigns was about to attack Owens with a steel chair, Zayn pleaded with Reigns to stop, only for Reigns to then instruct Zayn to attack Owens with the chair to prove his loyalty to The Bloodline. Zayn instead attacked Reigns with the chair. Afterwards, Jimmy, Sikoa, and Reigns attacked Zayn, while Jey left the ring without joining the beatdown. On the following episode of SmackDown, as Reigns tried to address the events at the Royal Rumble, Zayn attacked Reigns from behind and stated that he initially did not want anything from Reigns, but he now wanted the Undisputed WWE Universal Championship. Jey was absent that night, and Jimmy and Sikoa attacked Zayn, after which, Reigns accepted his challenge, stating that since Zayn hurt his family, he would hurt Zayn in front of his own family in Montreal.

On January 30, it was announced that Austin Theory would defend the United States Championship in an Elimination Chamber match, marking the first time for the title to be contested in the structure. Qualifying matches began on that night's episode of Raw, with Seth "Freakin" Rollins, Johnny Gargano, and Bronson Reed earning their spots in the match by defeating Chad Gable, Baron Corbin, and Dolph Ziggler, respectively. The last two qualifying matches took place on the following week's episode, where Damian Priest and Montez Ford earned their spots by defeating Angelo Dawkins and Elias, respectively.

On the January 30 episode of Raw, WWE official Adam Pearce announced that due to the women's Royal Rumble match winner choosing to challenge for the SmackDown Women's Championship at WrestleMania 39, Bianca Belair's challenger for the Raw Women's Championship at WrestleMania would be determined by an Elimination Chamber match, consisting of three wrestlers from both Raw and SmackDown each. The first qualifiers were confirmed as the four runner ups in the women's Royal Rumble match: Asuka and Nikki Cross from Raw and Liv Morgan and Raquel Rodriguez from SmackDown. The fifth and sixth spots were decided in two fatal four-way matches. The first took place on the February 3 episode of SmackDown, where Natalya defeated Shayna Baszler, Shotzi, and Zelina Vega, while the second occurred on the February 6 episode of Raw, where the returning Carmella defeated Candice LeRae, "Michin" Mia Yim, and Piper Niven. The following week, both Becky Lynch and Bayley expressed their desire to compete in the Elimination Chamber match, however, Belair interrupted and stated that if they wanted to compete in the match, they should go through her first. Pearce then scheduled a triple threat match for that night, where if Bayley or Lynch won, then they would be added to the match, however, if Belair won, neither would be added; Belair was victorious.

At Extreme Rules in October 2022, Judgment Day member Finn Bálor defeated Edge in an "I Quit" match after fellow Judgment Day member, Rhea Ripley, forced him to quit after threatening to attack Edge's wife Beth Phoenix with a con-chair-to. Despite Edge giving up, Ripley still attacked Phoenix with the maneuver. At the Royal Rumble, Edge returned as an entrant in the men's Royal Rumble match, where he faced off against Judgment Day members Bálor, Damian Priest, and Dominik Mysterio. After Edge eliminated Bálor and Priest, Edge tried to eliminate Mysterio, however, Bálor and Priest eliminated Edge. A brawl then ensued between Edge and Judgment Day on the entrance aisle. Ripley then joined only for Phoenix to make her return and perform a Spear on Ripley. On the February 6 episode of Raw, Edge and Phoenix challenged Bálor and Ripley to a mixed tag team match at Elimination Chamber, which Bálor accepted.

At the 2022 Royal Rumble, Bobby Lashley defeated Brock Lesnar, thanks to outside interference. They had a rematch at Crown Jewel in November which Lesnar won, although Lashley dominated the match. At Raw is XXX on January 23, 2023, Lesnar returned from hiatus and cost Lashley his United States Championship match. The two then competed in the 2023 Men's Royal Rumble match where Lashley eliminated Lesnar. On the February 6 episode of Raw, Lesnar appeared with a contract to challenge Lashley to another match at Elimination Chamber. Lashley came out and stated that he would give Lesnar an answer later on after reviewing the contract. This prompted Lesnar to attack Lashley with two F-5s. A contract signing for the match occurred the following week, and after Lashley laid out Lesnar, he signed the contract to make the match official.

== Event ==
Other on-screen personnel
Role:	Name:
English commentators	Michael Cole
English commentators	Corey Graves
Spanish commentators	Marcelo Rodriguez
Spanish commentators	Jerry Soto
Ring announcers	Mike Rome (Raw/Men's Elimination Chamber Match)
Ring announcers	Samantha Irvin (SmackDown/Women's Elimination Chamber Match)
Referees	Danilo Anfibio
Referees	Jason Ayers
Referees	Jessika Carr
Referees	Dan Engler
Referees	Daphanie LaShaunn
Referees	Eddie Orengo
Referees	Chad Patton
Referees	Ryan Tran
Referees	Rod Zapata
Pre-show panel	Kayla Braxton
Pre-show panel	Kevin Patrick
Pre-show panel	Peter Rosenberg
Pre-show panel	Wade Barrett
Pre-show panel	Ariel Helwani

=== Preliminary matches ===
The PLE opened with the women's Elimination Chamber match for a Raw Women's Championship match at WrestleMania 39. Liv Morgan and Natalya began the match. Morgan threw Natalya face first into the chamber walls. Natalya threw Morgan into a chamber pod. Raquel Rodriguez entered third and dominated Natalya and Morgan. After Nikki Cross entered fourth, Cross dominated Morgan, Natalya, and Rodriguez and performed a Crossbody from the top of a chamber pod onto the three. Carmella entered fifth and attempted to pin Morgan and Natalya, but both were nearfalls. Carmella then locked herself inside a chamber pod to escape Cross, however, Rodriguez drove Cross through the pod, destroying it in the process. Carmella then locked herself into a second chamber pod while Rodriguez brought Cross back in the ring, and pinned her to eliminate Cross. Morgan climbed the chamber wall and performed a Sunset Bomb off the top of a pod on Rodriguez. Carmella took advantage and tried to pin Rodriguez for a nearfall. Asuka entered last and dominated Carmella, driving her into the chamber walls. As Morgan attempted to perform an Ob-Liv-ion on Natalya, Carmella intercepted with a kick on Morgan. Natalya applied the Sharpshooter on Morgan and then Asuka simultaneously applied an Asuka Lock on Morgan, who passed out, resulting in Morgan's elimination. Carmella performed a Princess Kick on Natalya to eliminate her. Asuka and Carmella teamed up on Rodriguez, performing a double pin on Rodriguez to eliminate her. In the end, Asuka forced Carmella to submit to the Asuka Lock to win the match and earn a Raw Women's Championship match against Bianca Belair at WrestleMania 39. This win also made Asuka the first woman to win the Royal Rumble, Money in the Bank, and Elimination Chamber matches.

Next, Bobby Lashley took on Brock Lesnar. Lesnar performed a Spear on Lashley and clotheslined him out of the ring. As Lesnar brought Lashley back in the ring, Lashley performed a Spear on Lesnar for a nearfall. Lashley performed a second Spear on Lesnar and attempted the Hurt Lock, however Lesnar escaped and performed an F-5 on Lashley for a nearfall. Lesnar performed a second F-5 on Lashley for a nearfall. In the closing moments, Lashley performed a third Spear on Lesnar and applied the Hurt Lock on him, however, in an attempt to break the hold, Lesnar inadvertently attacked Lashley with a low blow, thus Lashley won via disqualification. Following the match, an angered Lesnar performed an F-5 on the referee and on Lashley. Lesnar then performed an F-5 on Lashley through an announce table and delivered another F-5 to the referee.

Next, Edge and Beth Phoenix faced The Judgment Day (Finn Bálor and Rhea Ripley, accompanied by Dominik Mysterio) in a mixed tag team match. During the match, as Phoenix attempted a Splash on Ripley, Mysterio tripped Phoenix. Edge chased after Mysterio, who ran to the backstage area, knocking over Bálor in the process, however, Mysterio later returned at ringside. Phoenix performed a DDT on Ripley and attempted to tag to Edge, only for Bálor to crawl under the ring to reach Edge and knock him off the apron. As Edge and Phoenix simultaneously applied the Edgecator on Bálor and Ripley, respectively, Mysterio tried to intervene only for the referee to prevent him from doing so. Ripley performed a headbutt on Phoenix and struck Edge with brass knuckles. Ripley placed Bálor onto Edge for a pin only for Phoenix to break up the pin attempt. In a further attempt to taunt Edge, Ripley placed Phoenix on the steel stairs and attempted a con-chair-to, however, Phoenix escaped and performed a Glam Slam on Ripley at ringside. Back in the ring, Bálor performed a Sling Blade on Edge and went for the Shotgun Dropkick, but Edge intercepted him with a Spear. Edge and Phoenix then performed the Shatter Machine on Bálor to win the match.

In the penultimate match, Austin Theory defended the United States Championship against Bronson Reed, Damian Priest, Johnny Gargano, Montez Ford, and Seth "Freakin" Rollins in an Elimination Chamber match. Gargano and Rollins began the match. Theory entered third and began to target Gargano and Rollins, after which, Theory sent Gargano into the wall of a chamber pod. Theory attempted to rekindle his alliance with Gargano, dating back to NXT, however, Gargano turned on Theory. Theory locked himself in a chamber pod, however, Rollins opened the pod and both Gargano and Rollins attacked Theory while inside the pod. Priest entered fourth and dominated Gargano and Rollins. Theory cheered Priest on, however, Priest attacked him with a kick. Rollins performed a Superplex and a Falcon Arrow on Priest for a nearfall. Reed entered fifth and dominated the other competitors. Reed then performed a double Samoan Drop on Gargano and Rollins. Reed tried to pin Rollins which resulted in a nearfall. Reed performed a splash on Priest into the pod. Priest then performed a Shoulder Tackle on Theory off the turnbuckle, after which, Reed sent Theory into the pod. The last to enter was Ford. Paying homage to The Rock, Ford attempted his own People's Elbow on Theory only for Reed to intercept Ford. Theory then lifted Reed on his shoulders, only for Reed to counter into a Powerslam. Rollins took out Gargano, who was atop Reed's shoulders: Gargano in turn performed a Hurricanrana on Reed and Ford tried to pin Reed for a nearfall. Ford performed a Crossbody off the roof of the chamber onto Gargano, Rollins, Theory, Reed, and Priest. Gargano, Ford, and Rollins performed superkicks on Reed, after which, Gargano performed Final Beat on Reed followed by Rollins performing a Stomp on Reed. Ford performed From The Heavens on Reed to eliminate him. Gargano and Rollins knocked off Theory and Priest off the chamber wall, after which, Gargano and Rollins brawled atop a chamber pod. Rollins attempted a Powerbomb on Gargano, however, Gargano countered into a Hurricanrana sending Rollins off the chamber pod onto the other competitors. Priest performed the Razor's Edge on Gargano to eliminate him. As Rollins lifted Priest, Ford performed a Blockbuster on Priest to eliminate him. Ford performed Suicide Dives on Rollins and Theory. As Ford performed From The Heavens on Theory, Theory raised his knees to block the impact. Rollins performed the Stomp by Ford outside the ring and Theory pinned Ford to eliminate him. Following his elimination, referees tended to Ford and helped him to the backstage area. In the closing moments, Rollins performed a Pedigree on Theory, however, Logan Paul, who eliminated Rollins in the men's Royal Rumble match, appeared as Ford was leaving. Paul performed The Stomp on Rollins and Theory then performed A-Town Down on Rollins to retain the title.

=== Main event ===
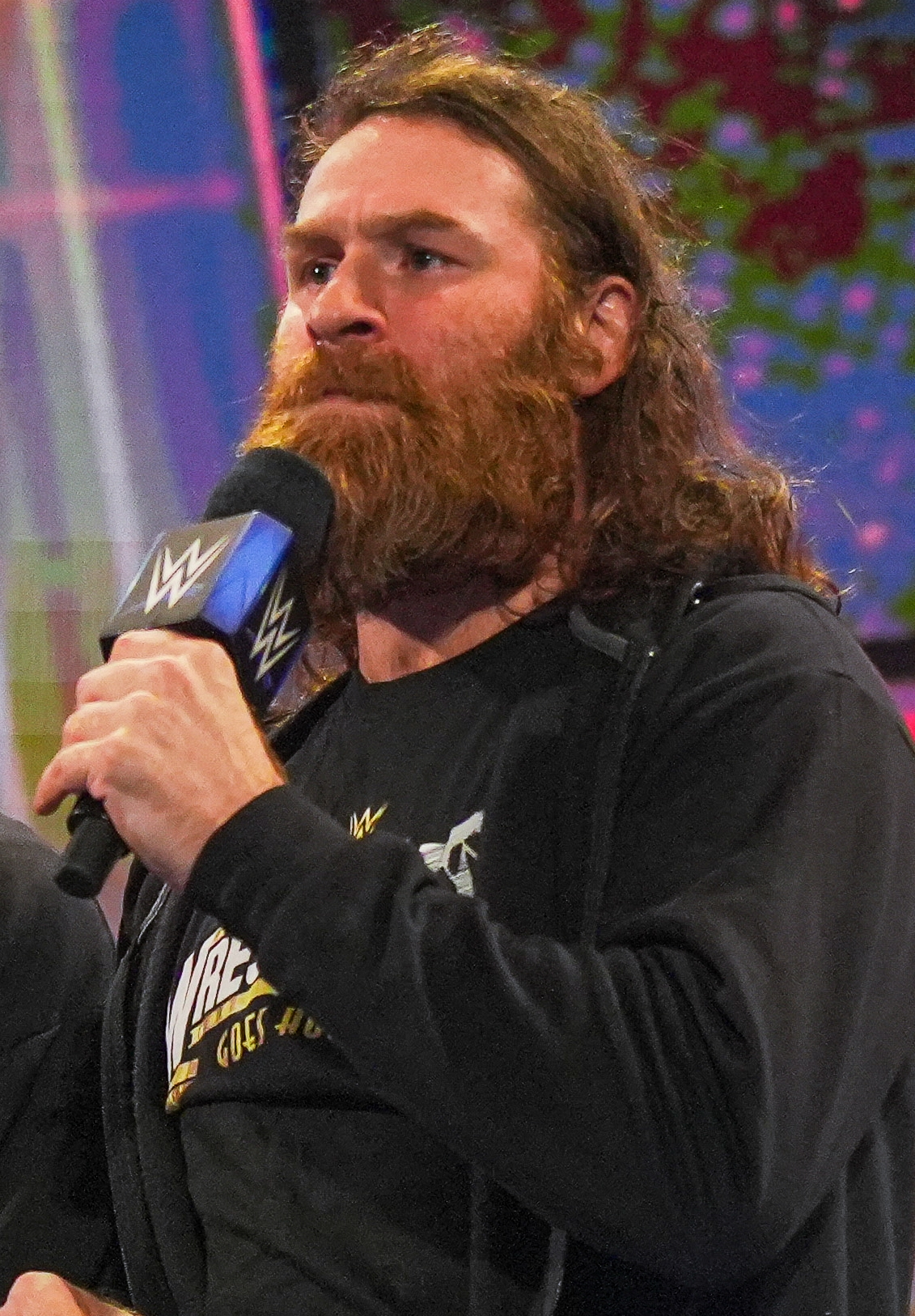
Montreal-native Sami Zayn received enormous favorable crowd reaction and praise for his performance in the main event.

In the main event, Roman Reigns (accompanied by Paul Heyman) defended the Undisputed WWE Universal Championship against Sami Zayn. As soon as the match started, the hometown crowd cheered for Zayn, while viciously booing and hurling insults towards Reigns. Reigns withstood an offensive flurry by Zayn before taunting the crowd, including Zayn's wife, who was seated in the front row. Zayn performed a Sunset Bomb on Reigns for a nearfall. Reigns performed a Uranage on Zayn for a nearfall. Zayn countered a Superman Punch into an Exploder Suplex. Reigns countered a Helluva Kick into a Superman Punch for a nearfall. As Reigns attempted a Spear, Zayn leapt over and rolled up Reigns for a nearfall. Zayn performed another Exploder Suplex on Reigns and followed up with his own Superman Punch and the Helluva Kick for a nearfall. Outside the ring, Reigns attempted a Spear, however, Zayn stepped out of the way, causing him to crash into the barricade. Back in the ring, Zayn performed a Blue Thunderbomb on Reigns for a nearfall. As Zayn attempted a second Blue Thunderbomb, Reigns countered and sent Zayn into the referee, incapacitating him. Zayn then performed a Helluva Kick, however, the referee was unable to count the pin. Jimmy Uso, who was told by Heyman to stay home a week prior, appeared and performed an Uso Splash on Zayn. Jimmy placed Reigns onto Zayn and a new referee came out to count the pin which resulted in a nearfall. Reigns performed a second Spear on Zayn for a nearfall. As Reigns attempted another Superman Punch, he accidentally incapacitated the new referee. Heyman obtained a chair from under the ring and passed it to Reigns. Jey Uso then appeared and Reigns lambasted Jey for siding with Zayn. Reigns then handed the chair to Jey, however, a conflicted Jey refused to strike Zayn. Zayn then attempted a Spear on Reigns, however, Reigns moved out of the way and Zayn accidentally struck Jey instead. Reigns then attacked Zayn with the chair, and performed a third Spear on Zayn to retain the titles.

Following the match, Reigns and Jimmy attacked Zayn until Kevin Owens appeared and attacked Jimmy. Owens then attacked Reigns and performed Stunners on both Reigns and Jimmy. Owens then performed a Pop-up Powerbomb on Jimmy through the announce table. Owens then retrieved a chair, only for Heyman to attack Owens to no avail. Owens then performed a Stunner on Heyman. Zayn performed a Helluva Kick on Reigns, and had a staredown with Owens, who left the ring. Zayn then received a standing ovation from the hometown crowd as the event came to an end.

== Reception ==
The event received positive reviews, with critics praising both Elimination Chamber matches, the execution of the main event, and the mixed tag team match, but were critical of the Brock Lesnar vs. Bobby Lashley match.

Brent Brookhouse of CBS Sports gave the Lesnar-Lashley match a grade of C−, stating that the match was "not satisfying in any way but that was likely the means to an end to get to a no-disqualification rematch at WrestleMania." He called the women's Elimination Chamber match "solid, if unspectacular," the mixed tag team match was "well-put together" and "made the Montreal crowd happy," and the men's Elimination Chamber match was "solid," and that Logan Paul's interference "won't satisfy many but it's building to a very obvious WrestleMania match." Brookhouse gave the main event match a grade of A, stating that "a hot crowd always makes a wrestling match better and Montreal was positively on fire," and that "the ending won't satisfy everyone," but "the match was given time and Zayn was positioned as a legitimate threat."

Erik Beaston of Bleacher Report called the women's Elimination Chamber match a "smartly laid-out match," and gave the Lashley-Lesnar match a grade of C+, stating that if they were to set up a match between Lashley and Bray Wyatt without Lesnar losing clean, "don't book the guy whose desperation lost him the match to then look like a dominant monster seconds later." He called the mixed tag team match "energetic" while saying that the finish to the match suggested that Bálor vs. Edge at WrestleMania 39 "is now off the table," and that Beth Phoenix vs. Rhea Ripley "feels like a match WWE can revisit at any point." Beaston gave the men's Elimination Chamber match a grade of A+, stating that the match "was an NXT-ish Chamber match," and that everyone involved had "the chance to shine rather than being set dressing for the one or two guys who actually matter." He concluded that the match "strengthened the Raw brand through expert booking." Beaston also gave the Undisputed WWE Universal Championship match a grade of A+, calling it "professional wrestling perfection," a "dramatic masterpiece," and that Roman Reigns was "the master of the near-fall, shooting his shoulder off the mat at the last possible second to maximize the reaction." He said that "the story was all about Zayn and Jey, who started as rivals before developing a friendship that is now in question after the events of the past month," and that "their story will define what they do at The Show of Shows." Beaston said that Reigns and Zayn "delivered an instant classic that will be on many year-end award lists 10 months from now and recapped in "best of" lists for years to come," and that "everyone involved should be extremely proud of what they have accomplished."

Sports Illustrated were also complimentary of the main event.

The highest rated match on the card, according to Dave Meltzer, was the Undisputed WWE Universal Championship match, which received 4.75 stars. The men's Elimination Chamber match received 4.5 stars, the women's Elimination Chamber match and the mixed tag team match both received 4 stars, and Brock Lesnar vs. Bobby Lashley was the lowest rated match, receiving 2.25 stars.

== Aftermath ==
=== Raw ===
During the Elimination Chamber post-event press conference, United States Champion Austin Theory issued an open challenge for the title. The challenge was accepted by Edge, as he felt his feud with The Judgment Day was over. On the following episode of Raw, however, Edge lost due to interference from Finn Bálor. The following week, Bálor said their feud was not done and challenged Edge to a match at WrestleMania 39. On the March 6 episode, Edge interfered in Bálor's match, causing him to lose. Afterwards, Edge performed a Spear on Bálor and challenged him to meet him alone in the ring the following week. There, the two agreed to a Hell in a Cell match at WrestleMania 39 with Edge wanting to face Bálor's "Demon" persona and Bálor agreed.

Also on Raw, Sami Zayn addressed his loss at Elimination Chamber and said he needed to talk to one person, Kevin Owens. Zayn stated that despite their issues, the only thing that mattered was taking down The Bloodline, and that it could only be done together. Owens said that he only assisted Zayn so that Zayn's family would not have to see him get destroyed like Owens did in front of his own family at the Royal Rumble while Zayn had watched on. He followed up by saying that he would keep fighting The Bloodline alone and told Zayn to ask his "friend", Jey Uso, for help.

Omos and his manager MVP addressed the match between Brock Lesnar and Bobby Lashley from Elimination Chamber. MVP called Lesnar a coward and claimed that Lesnar intentionally got himself disqualified because Lesnar knew he could not break Lashley's Hurt Lock submission. MVP then invited Lesnar to Raw the following week to accept Omos' challenge for a match at WrestleMania 39. On that episode, after MVP sold him on the match, Lesnar accepted to make it official.

On the February 27 episode of Raw, Seth "Freakin" Rollins called out Logan Paul to meet him face-to-face the following week, and Paul accepted. There, Rollins wanted to fight, but Paul said he would not fight for free and hinted that they could fight at WrestleMania 39. WrestleMania host The Miz said he could make the match official, and it was later confirmed.

Also on the following episode of Raw, Bobby Lashley claimed that no one, including Bray Wyatt (who on the SmackDown before Elimination Chamber stated that he would target the winner of Brock Lesnar vs. Lashley), could break his Hurt Lock submission and stated that everyone needed to show him respect or else he would put them down. Wyatt then began playing head games with Lashley on subsequent episodes of Raw and SmackDown, which further enraged him. Lashley then appeared on the March 3 episode of SmackDown to confront Wyatt, but was instead confronted by Uncle Howdy, who Lashley fended off. However, later that month, with Wyatt absent, the angle was dropped. It was then reported that Wyatt was dealing with an undisclosed illness. On August 19, it was revealed that the illness was life-threatening, but he was making positive progress towards a return. However, just five days later on August 24, Wyatt unexpectedly died of a heart attack. It was also revealed that the illness was COVID-19, which had exacerbated an existing heart issue.

=== SmackDown ===
On the following episode of SmackDown, Paul Heyman informed Jimmy Uso that he needed to deal with his brother, Jey, or else Roman Reigns, who would be appearing the following week, would deal with Jey himself. Later that night, Jimmy cut a promo about always being there for Jey just like Jey was for him. Jimmy talked about The Bloodline's issues. Sami Zayn appeared and said that until the Royal Rumble, Jimmy had always been there for Zayn, including making him an honorary Bloodline member. Jimmy responded that it was Zayn who made the choice to betray The Bloodline and Jimmy put his family first, after which, Jey appeared from the crowd. Jimmy then attacked Zayn before Jey headed towards ringside, allowing Zayn to perform a Helluva Kick on Jimmy, who was urging Jey to join him. Afterwards, Solo Sikoa came out and Zayn retreated but had a brief staredown with Jey. Over the coming weeks, Zayn tried to convince The Usos that Reigns was seemingly maniupulating them. Jimmy maintained loyalty to his family, while Jey's uncertainty continued until the March 6 episode of Raw where he seemingly sided with Zayn, but turned on him, because Zayn was not family. The following week, Reigns' WrestleMania opponent Cody Rhodes attempted to help mend things over between Owens and Zayn, but Owens refused; however, later that night, Owens came to Zayn's aid, who got ambushed by The Usos, and Owens and Zayn embraced. On the March 20 episode of Raw, The Usos accepted Owens and Zayn's challenge for a match at WrestleMania 39 for the Undisputed WWE Tag Team Championship.

== Results ==
No.	Results	Stipulations	Times
1	Asuka defeated Carmella, Liv Morgan, Natalya, Nikki Cross, and Raquel Rodriguez	Elimination Chamber match for a WWE Raw Women's Championship match at WrestleMania 39	19:30
2	Bobby Lashley defeated Brock Lesnar by disqualification	Singles match	4:45
3	Edge and Beth Phoenix defeated The Judgment Day (Finn Bálor and Rhea Ripley) (with Dominik Mysterio) by pinfall	Mixed tag team match	13:50
4	Austin Theory (c) defeated Bronson Reed, Damian Priest, Johnny Gargano, Montez Ford, and Seth "Freakin" Rollins	Elimination Chamber match for the WWE United States Championship	31:30
5	Roman Reigns (c) (with Paul Heyman) defeated Sami Zayn by pinfall	Singles match for the Undisputed WWE Universal Championship (Note: The name "Undisputed WWE Universal Championship" referred to both the WWE Championship and Universal Championship being held and defended together, although both titles remained independently active.)	32:20
(c) / – the champion(s) heading into the match

=== Women's Elimination Chamber match ===
Eliminated	Wrestler	Entered	Eliminated by	Method	Time
1	Nikki Cross	4	Raquel Rodriguez	Pinfall	11:40
2	Liv Morgan	2	Asuka and Natalya	Technical submission	16:40
3	Natalya	1	Carmella	Pinfall	17:25
4	Raquel Rodriguez	3	Asuka and Carmella	Pinfall	18:25
5	Carmella	5	Asuka	Submission	19:30
Winner	Asuka	6			19:30

=== United States Championship Elimination Chamber match ===
Eliminated	Wrestler	Entered	Eliminated by	Method	Time
1	Bronson Reed	5	Montez Ford	Pinfall	18:00
2	Johnny Gargano	1	Damian Priest	Pinfall	23:01
3	Damian Priest	4	Montez Ford	Pinfall	24:53
4	Montez Ford	6	Austin Theory	Pinfall	27:45
5	Seth "Freakin" Rollins	2	Austin Theory	Pinfall	31:30
Winner	Austin Theory (c)	3			31:30
