= The Brawling Brutes =

Professional wrestling stable in WWE

- The Brawling Brutes' logo

Stable
- Leader: Sheamus
- Members: Ridge Holland; Butch
- Name: The Brawling Brutes
- Billed heights: Sheamus: 6 ft 3 in (1.91 m); Holland: 6 ft 1 in (1.85 m); Butch: 5 ft 10 in (1.78 m)
- Combined billed weight: 975 lb (442 kg)
- Debut: November 19, 2021
- Disbanded: November 24, 2023
- Years active: 2021–2023

The Brawling Brutes were a professional wrestling stable in WWE. The stable was led by Sheamus and also contained Ridge Holland and Butch. The group started in November 2021. In August 2023, Sheamus suffered a shoulder injury and three months later in November, Holland walked out on Butch during a tag team match, ending the group in the process.

== History ==
As part of the 2021 draft, Holland was promoted from NXT to the SmackDown roster. On the November 19 episode of SmackDown, Holland interfered in a four-way match, helping Sheamus to win and thus forming an alliance. The duo defeated Cesaro and Ricochet in a tag team match on January 1, 2022, at the Day 1 pre-show, during which, Holland suffered a broken nose. In March, they would enter a feud with The New Day, where on the March 11 episode of SmackDown, Sheamus and Holland introduced Butch as part of their stable. After an overhead belly-to-belly suplex by Holland on Big E legitimately broke the latter's neck, Big E was promptly removed from the rivalry, leaving only Kofi Kingston and Xavier Woods. On Night 2 of WrestleMania 38, Holland and Sheamus defeated Kingston and Woods in a tag team match.

On the August 19 episode of SmackDown, Sheamus won a fatal five-way match, earning a match against Gunther for the Intercontinental Championship at Clash at the Castle. The following week on SmackDown, Sheamus and Gunther had a confrontation, in which Sheamus and Gunther's respective allies, Butch and Ludwig Kaiser, engaged in a brawl. At Clash at the Castle, Sheamus lost to Gunther. On the September 23 episode of SmackDown, Holland and Butch faced The Usos for the Undisputed WWE Tag Team Championship but were unsuccessful after interference from Imperium, then on the October 4 episode of NXT faced Pretty Deadly for the NXT Tag Team Championship in a losing effort after interference from Imperium. Four days later at Extreme Rules, The Brawling Brutes defeated Imperium in a six-man tag team Good Old Fashioned Donnybrook match.

After defeating The Bloodline's Sami Zayn and Solo Sikoa in a tag team match, Holland and Butch received another opportunity against The Usos at Crown Jewel where they failed to win the titles. Three weeks later at Survivor Series WarGames on November 26, The Brawling Brutes along with Drew McIntyre and Kevin Owens lost to The Bloodline in a WarGames match. After regaining each other's respect at Survivor Series WarGames, Sheamus and McIntyre reformed their on-again-off-again tag team, which they jokingly referred to by the suggestive name, "The Banger Brothers", leading to McIntyre becoming an ally of the Brutes.

The Brawling Brutes entered into feuds with Pretty Deadly and The Judgment Day throughout the summer of 2023. All three members competed in the 25-man Slim Jim SummerSlam Battle Royal, but none were successful in winning. In September, it was reported that Sheamus had been removed from television in late-August after suffering a shoulder injury, leaving Butch and Holland on their own. He would then be removed from the group's titantron in November. Butch would enter the NXT Global Heritage Invitational and would win the tournament by beating Joe Coffey in the finals. Butch would fail to beat Noam Dar for the NXT Heritage Cup. Butch made an alliance with former British Strong Style stablemate Tyler Bate to fight Joe Coffey's group Gallus. Holland would interfere in their match to help Butch. A six man tag team Pub Rules Match would end the feud with The Brawling Brutes beating Gallus. The Brawling Brutes would remain on NXT to be in the NXT Bada Bing Bada Boom Tag Team Battle Royal and was eliminated by OTM.

=== Disbandment and aftermath (2023–2025) ===
On the November 17 episode of SmackDown, visible dissension appeared between Holland and Butch after a loss to Street Profits. One week later, Holland walked out on Butch during a tag team match against Pretty Deadly, resulting in a loss in what would be their final match as a team. On the December 19 episode of NXT, Holland returned to the brand to challenge NXT Champion Ilja Dragunov for the title, thus confirming his departure from SmackDown.

A few weeks into the start of 2024, Dunne would reunite with Tyler Bate as the New Catch Republic while Holland remained on NXT until his departure in November 2025. Sheamus would remain a member of the WWE roster until his departure from the company in September 2026.

== Championships and accomplishments ==
- Pro Wrestling Illustrated
  - Ranked No. 76 of the top 100 tag teams in the PWI Tag Team 100 in 2023
