= WWE Women's Championship =

Professional wrestling world championship

- The current WWE Women's Championship belt with default side plates (2023–present)

Details
- Promotion: WWE
- Brand: SmackDown
- Date established: April 3, 2016
- Current champion: Tiffany Stratton
- Date won: November 7, 2026

Other names
- WWE Women's Championship (2016, 2023–present); WWE Raw Women's Championship (2016–2023)
Statistics
- First champion: Charlotte Flair (Note: When she became the inaugural champion, her ring name was just Charlotte.)
- Most reigns: Charlotte Flair (6 reigns)
- Longest reign: Bianca Belair (1st reign, 420 days) (Note: 419 days as recognized by WWE.)
- Shortest reign: Bianca Belair (2nd reign, 1 minute and 35 seconds)
- Oldest champion: Asuka (41 years, 243 days)
- Youngest champion: Sasha Banks (24 years, 181 days)
- Heaviest champion: Nia Jax (272 lb (123 kg))
- Lightest champion: Alexa Bliss (102 pounds (46 kg))

The WWE Women's Championship is a women's professional wrestling world championship created and promoted by the American promotion WWE, defended on the SmackDown brand division. It is one of two women's world titles for WWE's main roster, along with the Women's World Championship on Raw. The current champion is Tiffany Stratton, who is in her second reign. She won the title by defeating Chelsea Green in Stratton's Money in the Bank cash-in match at Crown Jewel on November 7, 2026.

Established on April 3, 2016, at WrestleMania 32 and presented by WWE Hall of Famer Lita, it replaced the WWE Divas Championship and has a unique title history, separate from WWE's original Women's Championship and the Divas Championship. Charlotte Flair, then known simply as Charlotte, was the inaugural champion. As a result of the 2016 WWE Draft, the championship became exclusive to Raw and was renamed the Raw Women's Championship while SmackDown created the SmackDown Women's Championship as its counterpart. As a result of the 2023 WWE Draft, the Raw and SmackDown women's championships switched brands, with the Raw Women's Championship reverting to its original name of WWE Women's Championship, while the SmackDown title became the Women's World Championship. The WWE Women's Championship is the third overall women's singles championship to be created by WWE, after the Divas Championship and the NXT Women's Championship.

The title was the first women's championship to headline a WWE pay-per-view and livestreaming event, which occurred at Hell in a Cell in 2016. It also headlined WWE's first all-female event, Evolution in 2018. Along with the SmackDown Women's Championship at the time, it was also defended in the main event match of the 35th edition of WWE's flagship event, WrestleMania, in 2019, which was the first-ever women's match to headline the annual event.

== History ==
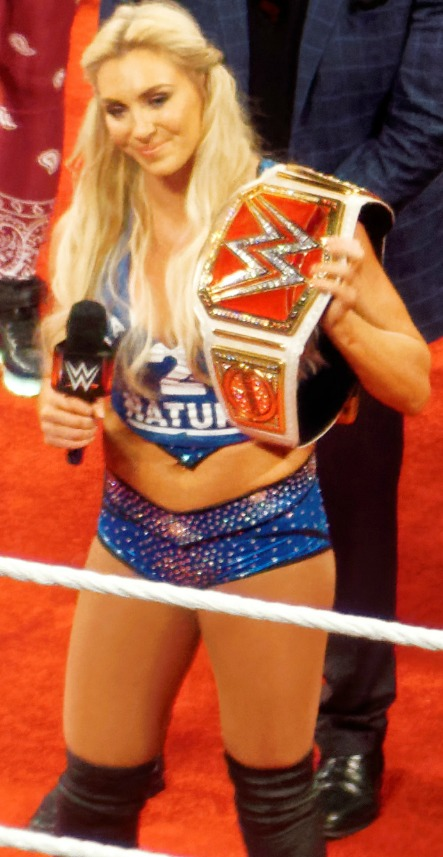
Inaugural and record six-time champion Charlotte Flair, pictured here with the original design of the championship belt (2016–2023).

The championship was established on April 3, 2016. During the WrestleMania 32 pre-show that day, WWE Hall of Famer Lita appeared: after recapping the history of women's professional wrestling in WWE, she declared that WWE's women would no longer be referred to as WWE Divas, but as "WWE Superstars" like their male counterparts. The term "Diva" had been criticized by some commentators, fans, and several past and present female wrestlers, including reigning Divas Champion Charlotte, as diminishing the athletic abilities of female wrestlers and relegating them to "eye candy". Lita also unveiled a new title belt and revealed that the Divas Championship would be retired in favor of a new WWE Women's Championship. The inaugural champion was determined by a triple threat match between Charlotte, Becky Lynch, and Sasha Banks later that night, which was originally scheduled for the Divas Championship. Charlotte, the final Divas Champion, became the first WWE Women's Champion by winning that match.

The title shares its name with the original WWE Women's Championship. However, the newer title does not share the same title history as the original, which was unified with the Divas Championship in 2010 and subsequently retired. WWE acknowledges the original championship as its predecessor, and notes that the lineage of female champions dates back to The Fabulous Moolah's reign in 1956.

Following the reintroduction of the brand split in July 2016, reigning champion Charlotte was drafted to the Raw brand, making the championship exclusive to Raw. It was subsequently renamed the Raw Women's Championship after SummerSlam in August, when SmackDown created the SmackDown Women's Championship as a counterpart title. The NXT Women's Championship would become WWE's third main women's title when NXT, the promotion's developmental brand, became recognized as WWE's third major brand in September 2019 when it was moved to the USA Network. However, this recognition was reversed when NXT reverted to being WWE's developmental brand in September 2021.

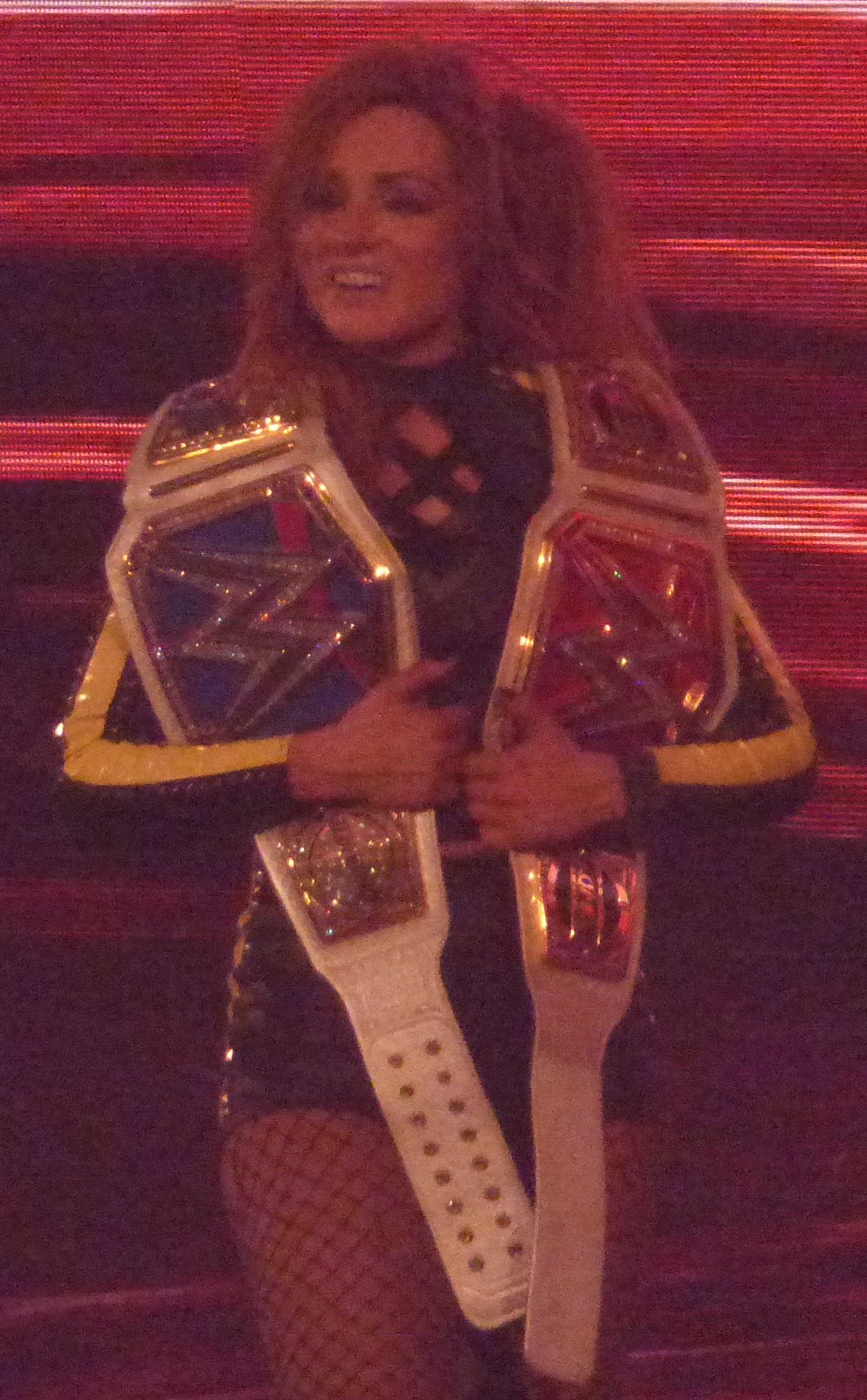
Becky Lynch with the then SmackDown Women's Championship (left) and the WWE Women's Championship (then known as the Raw Women's Championship) after becoming a double champion. She remains the only woman to hold both titles simultaneously and was part of the first WrestleMania main event to feature a women’s match.

The championship was the first women's title to be defended in the main event of a WWE pay-per-view and livestreaming event, which was at Hell in a Cell in October 2016; this was also the first-ever women's Hell in a Cell match and the first women's match to main event a WWE pay-per-view and livestreaming event. At the event, Charlotte (whose ring name was lengthened to Charlotte Flair) defeated Sasha Banks to become a three-time champion. After two years, it was again featured in the main event match of a pay-per-view and livestreaming event, which was the first-ever all-women's event Evolution in October 2018, where Ronda Rousey retained the title against Nikki Bella. Rousey then defended the title in a winner takes all triple threat match against SmackDown Women's Champion Charlotte Flair and Becky Lynch in the main event of WrestleMania 35 in April 2019, which Lynch won. This was the first women's match to main event a WrestleMania – WWE's flagship event. On May 10, 2020, the championship became the first in history to be directly rewarded as a result of winning the Money in the Bank ladder match (taped April 15, 2020), which was revealed when the briefcase was opened by Becky Lynch the following night on Raw. Lynch announced that she was forfeiting the title due to pregnancy and announced the Money in the Bank match winner, Asuka, as the new champion.

As a result of the 2023 WWE Draft, the Raw and SmackDown women's championships switched brands and there were no title changes for either championship before draft results went into effect on May 8. The issue of the Raw Women's Championship being on SmackDown was then resolved on the June 9, 2023, episode of SmackDown. That night, WWE official Adam Pearce unveiled a new championship belt to reigning champion Asuka, with the title subsequently reverting to its original name of WWE Women's Championship. The SmackDown Women's Championship was subsequently rebranded as the Women's World Championship on June 12.

On July 17, 2026, it was revealed that lineal champion Rhea Ripley was injured after sustaining a torn meniscus in a title defense against Jade Cargill at Clash in Italy on May 31. As Ripley was unable to return in time for SummerSlam, interim SmackDown General Manager Adam Pearce decided that instead of stripping the title from Ripley, there would be an interim champion until Ripley's return, with the interim champion being decided in a five-woman ladder match at SummerSlam. Qualifying matches were subsequently held to determine the participants and on Night 2 of the event on August 2, Chelsea Green defeated Jade Cargill, Charlotte Flair, Lash Legend, and Tiffany Stratton to become the interim WWE Women's Champion. On September 11, WWE retroactively recognized Green as the lineal champion with her reign beginning when she won the title on August 2, with Ripley's reign ending on the same date.

== Brand designation history ==
When the championship was unveiled, the brand extension was not in effect as that had ended in August 2011. From its inception until the reintroduction of the brand extension in July 2016, reigning champion Charlotte defended the title on both Raw and SmackDown.

| Date of transition | Brand | Notes |
|---|---|---|
| April 3, 2016 | N/A | When the championship was first introduced at Wrestlemania 32 it was avaliable to both Raw and SmackDown brands after Charlotte became the inaugural and the WWE Divas Championship was retired. |
| July 19, 2016 | Raw | WWE Women's Champion Charlotte was drafted to Raw in the 2016 WWE Draft.; The title was renamed to Raw Women's Championship on September 5, 2016, after SmackDown introduced the WWE SmackDown Women's Championship. |
| May 8, 2023 | SmackDown | Raw Women's Champion Bianca Belair was drafted to SmackDown during the 2023 WWE Draft.; The title reverted to its original name of WWE Women's Championship on June 9, 2023. |

== Championship belt designs ==
The original design of the championship used from 2016 to 2023.

The WWE Women's Championship belt uses the "Network Logo" design that was first used by the WWE Championship when it was introduced in August 2014 with a few notable differences. When it was originally unveiled, the die-cut WWE logo in the center plate sat on a red background, as opposed to black, while the small print below the logo read "Women's Champion", and the strap was smaller and white as opposed to black. The belt featured the same side plates, divided from the center plate by gold divider bars. In what has become a prominent feature on all of WWE's championship belts, the side plates feature a removable center section, which can be customized with the reigning champion's logo; the default side plates feature the WWE logo on a red globe. This was the first women's title in WWE with customizable side plates. The title retained this design when it was renamed as Raw Women's Championship in September 2016.

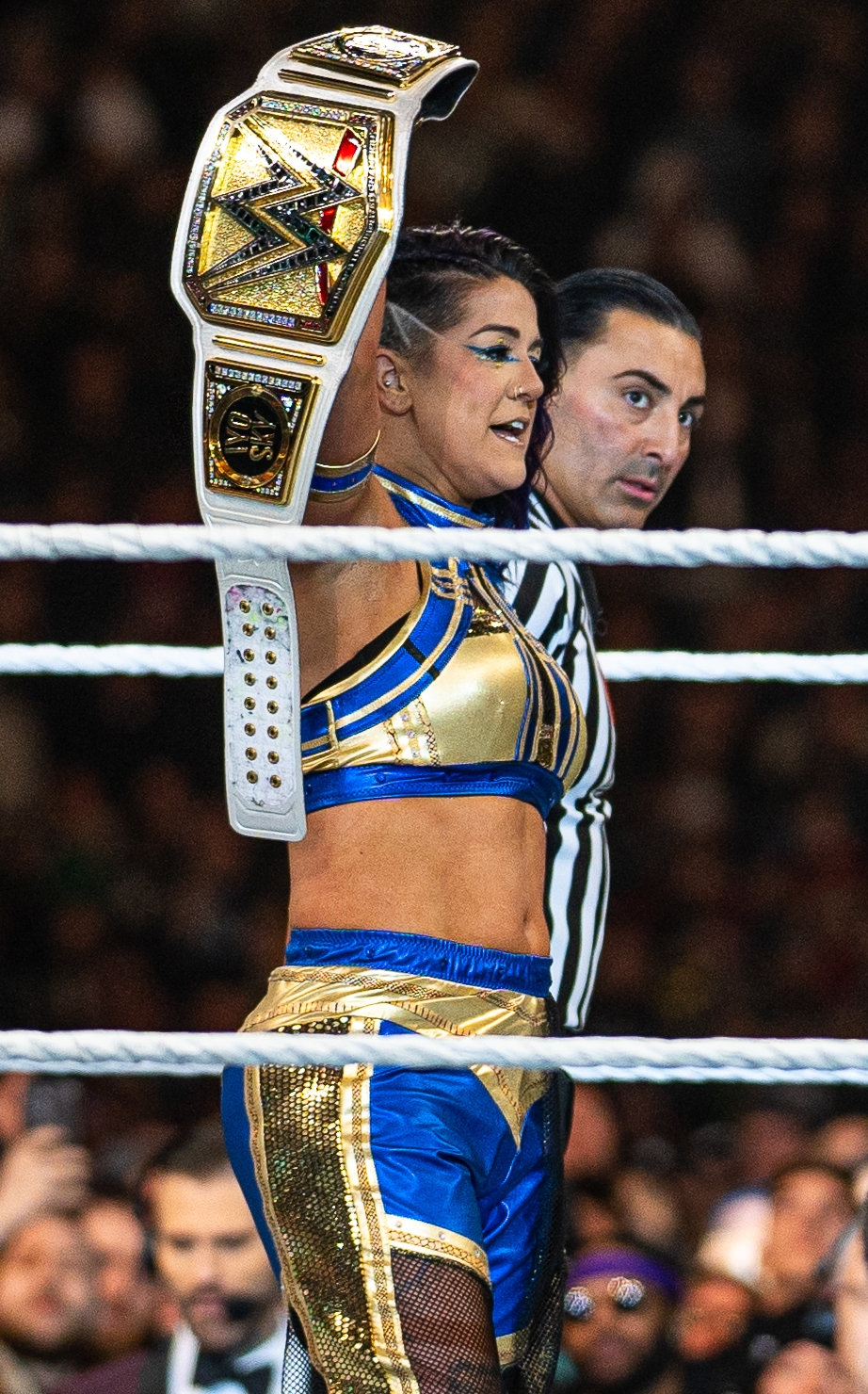
The second design of the title, held here by Bayley. Modeled after the men's Undisputed WWE Championship belt.

On the June 9, 2023, episode of SmackDown, WWE official Adam Pearce unveiled a new design for the title which reverted to being called the WWE Women's Championship. It uses the same "Network Logo" design, but with similarities to the men's Undisputed WWE Championship that was unveiled on the previous week's episode of SmackDown. It retains the smaller white strap and the side plates of the previous design, but in matching the men's title, the WWE logo is now encrusted with black diamonds on a gold nugget-textured background, which became part of the metal plate instead of colored leather, while the small print below the logo now reads "Women's Undisputed Champion" (although it was never contested in a unification match to bear the name "Undisputed", it simply appears on the belt to match its male counterpart).

In what has become a tradition since fall 2014, WWE has presented custom WWE Championship belts to winners in both male and female professional sports with the side plates commemorating the achievement. In September 2018, WWE began presenting custom Women's Championship belts to winners in just female sports. The first of these was given to the Seattle Storm for winning the 2018 WNBA Finals. Custom Women's Championship belts (originally the red design, but then the gold version beginning in 2023) have since been presented to the United States Women's National Soccer Team for winning the 2019 FIFA Women's World Cup, a team that previously received a custom WWE Championship for this feat in 2015, to Bianca Andreescu for winning the 2019 Women's US Open, and to the Chicago Sky and Las Vegas Aces for winning the 2021 and 2023 WNBA Finals, respectively.

== Reigns ==
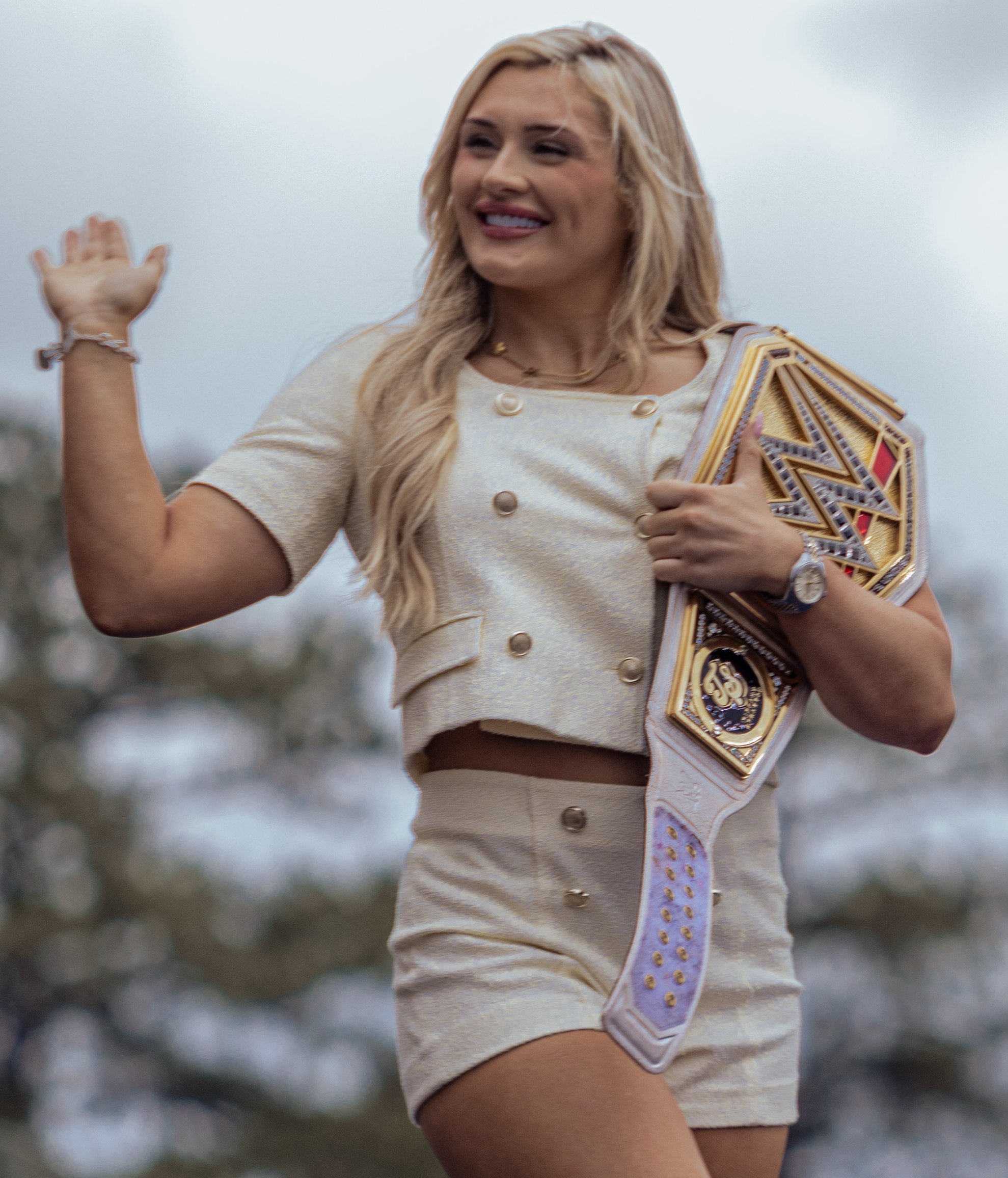
Current and two-time champion Tiffany Stratton

As of November 8, 2026, there have been 34 reigns between 15 champions. Charlotte Flair, then known simply as Charlotte, was the inaugural champion. She also has the most reigns at six. Bianca Belair's first reign is the longest at 420 days (425 days as recognized by WWE), while her second reign is the shortest at 1 minute and 35 seconds. Becky Lynch has the longest combined reign across her two reigns at 545 days (555 days as recognized by WWE). Asuka is the oldest champion, winning the title at the age of 41, while Sasha Banks is the youngest when she won the title at 24 years, 181 days old. Only two women have held the title for a continuous reign of one year (365 days) or more: Becky Lynch and Bianca Belair.

Tiffany Stratton is the current champion in her second reign. She won the title by defeating Chelsea Green in Stratton's Money in the Bank cash-in match at Crown Jewel in Riyadh, Saudi Arabia on November 7, 2026.

== Notes ==
Sporting positions
| Preceded by WWE Divas Championship | WWE's top women's championship 2016–present | Succeeded by Current |
