= WWE World Championship =

WWE World Championship may refer to:

- WWE Championship, briefly known as the WWE World Championship from July to December 2016, a men's professional wrestling world heavyweight championship in WWE created in 1963
- World Heavyweight Championship (WWE, 2002–2013), a previous WWE world championship that was created in 2002 and unified with the WWE Championship in 2013
- WWE Universal Championship, a previous WWE world championship that was created in 2016 and unified with the WWE Championship in 2022 and then retired in 2024
- World Heavyweight Championship (WWE), a current WWE world championship created in 2023

== See also ==
- World championships in WWE, an overview of the various men's world championships contested in the company throughout its history
- WCW World Heavyweight Championship
- ECW World Heavyweight Championship
- NXT Championship
