= WWE World Heavyweight Championship =

WWE World Heavyweight Championship may refer to:

- World Heavyweight Championship (WWE, 2002–2013), a professional wrestling championship that existed between 2002 and 2013
- World Heavyweight Championship (WWE, 2023–present), a professional wrestling championship created in 2023
- WWE Championship, which was called the WWE World Heavyweight Championship between 2013–2016
