= WWE Universal Championship =

Former men's professional wrestling world championship

- The SmackDown version of the championship belt (2019–2023).

Details
- Promotion: WWE
- Date established: July 25, 2016
- Date retired: April 7, 2024 (Note: WWE recognizes April 7, 2024, as the date of retirement, but did not implement this until April 21, 2025.)

Other names
- WWE Universal Championship (2016–2024); Undisputed WWE Universal Championship (2022–2024) (Note: Name used when defended with the WWE Championship from April 2022 until its recognized retirement in April 2024.)
Statistics
- First champion: Finn Bálor
- Final champion: Roman Reigns (Note: From April 2024 to April 2025, the official title history listed Cody Rhodes as champion, but upon his loss at WrestleMania 41, the title history was amended, removing Rhodes and retiring the title with Reigns recognized as the final champion.)
- Most reigns: Brock Lesnar (3 reigns)
- Longest reign: Roman Reigns (2nd reign, 1,316 days)
- Shortest reign: Finn Bálor (1 day) (Note: WWE recognizes this reign as lasting less than a day.)
- Oldest champion: Goldberg (53 years, 62 days)
- Youngest champion: Kevin Owens (32 years, 114 days)
- Heaviest champion: Braun Strowman (385 lb (175 kg))
- Lightest champion: Finn Bálor (190 lb (86 kg))

The WWE Universal Championship was a men's professional wrestling world heavyweight championship created and promoted by the American promotion WWE. Established in 2016, it was the third overall men's world championship created by the company, after the WWE Championship (1963) and the 2002–2013 version of the World Heavyweight Championship, and fifth overall used by the company, including the WCW Championship (2001) and the ECW Championship (2006–2010). From April 2022 until the title's official retirement in April 2024, it was jointly held and defended with the WWE Championship as the Undisputed WWE Universal Championship, but both titles maintained their individual lineages. The inaugural champion was Finn Bálor and the final recognized champion was Roman Reigns.

The championship was named in honor of WWE's fanbase, referred to as the WWE Universe, and it was established on July 25, 2016, to be the top title of the Raw brand, a division of WWE's roster. Its creation came as a result of the reintroduction of the brand split and subsequent draft on July 19, 2016, in which the WWE Championship, the promotion's original world title, became exclusive to the SmackDown brand. Matches for the championship headlined several pay-per-view and livestreaming events, including seven consecutive SummerSlams from 2017 to 2023, as well as five WrestleManias (34, 37 Night 2, 38 Night 2, 39 Night 2, and XL Night 2), both being two of WWE's "big five" events, the latter of which is WWE's flagship event. Following the aftermath of Crown Jewel 2019, the title moved to SmackDown where it remained until its retirement, albeit from April 2022 to May 2023, it also appeared on Raw as part of the Undisputed WWE Universal Championship but was still officially SmackDown's championship.

== History ==
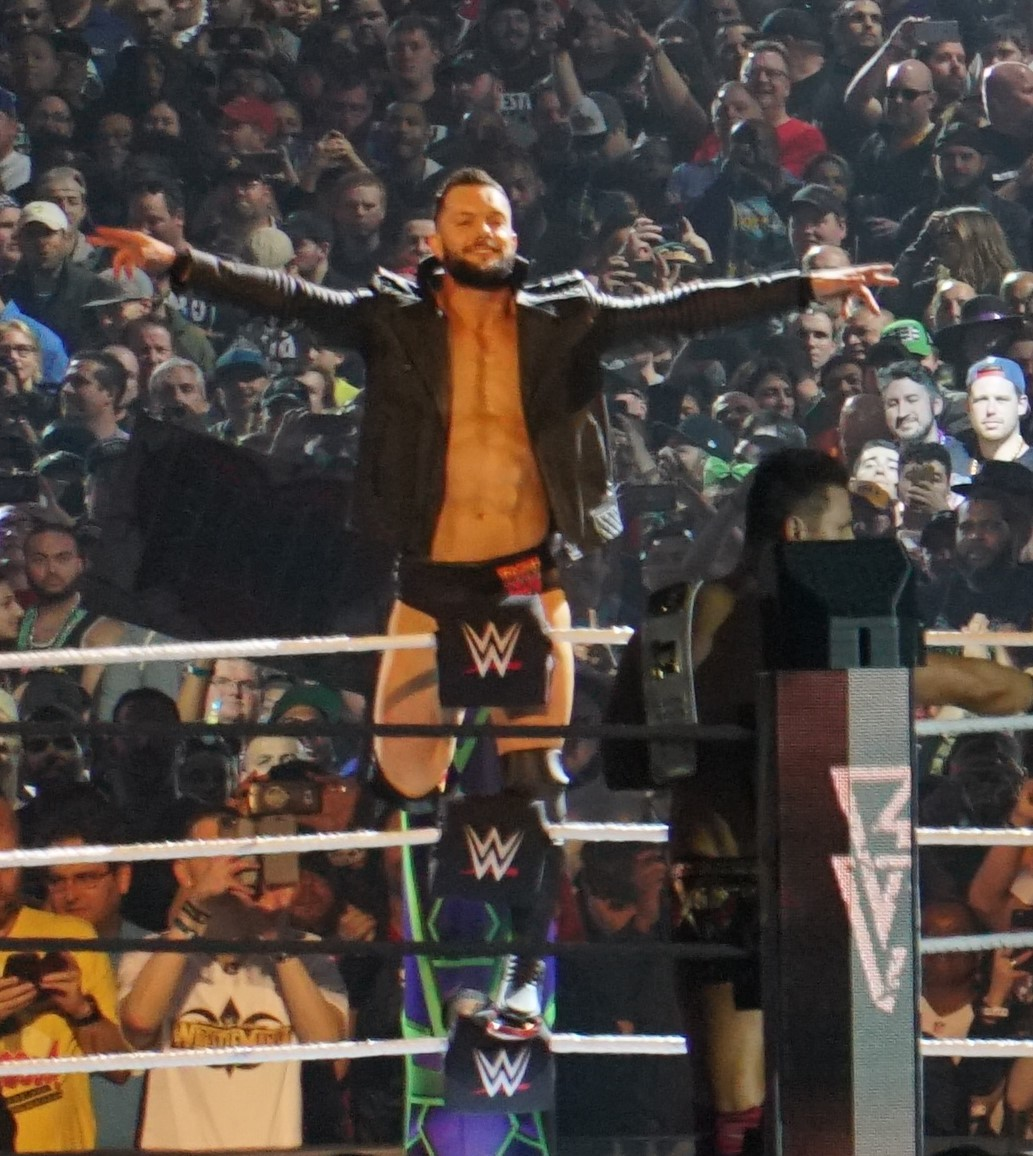
The inaugural WWE Universal Champion Finn Bálor

In mid-2016, the professional wrestling promotion WWE reintroduced the brand extension in which the promotion split its main roster between the Raw and SmackDown brands, where wrestlers would exclusively perform on each brands' respective weekly television program (the original brand split ended in August 2011). On July 19, 2016, to coincide with SmackDown shifting to a live broadcast format, the 2016 WWE Draft took place. During the draft, Dean Ambrose, who held the promotion's original world championship, the WWE Championship, was drafted to SmackDown. At Battleground on July 24, Ambrose retained the title in a triple threat match against Raw draftees Seth Rollins and Roman Reigns, thus leaving Raw without a world title. On the following episode of Raw, the brand's Commissioner Stephanie McMahon and General Manager Mick Foley established the WWE Universal Championship to serve as the brand's top championship. The title was named in honor of the WWE Universe, the name the promotion uses to refer to its fan base.

The inaugural champion was crowned at SummerSlam on August 21 in a pinfall and submission-only singles match. Rollins was automatically set for that match as he was Raw's number one draft pick and was not pinned in the WWE Championship match at Battleground. His opponent was determined by two fatal four-way matches on Raw, with the winners wrestling each other in a singles match. Finn Bálor won the first fatal four-way by defeating Cesaro, Kevin Owens, and Rusev, while Reigns won the second by defeating Chris Jericho, Sami Zayn, and Sheamus. Bálor then defeated Reigns and was added to the title match. At SummerSlam, Bálor, wrestling under his "Demon" persona, defeated Rollins to become the inaugural champion. Bálor was the first WWE wrestler to win a world title in his pay-per-view debut as well as winning his first world title in less than a month of his debut on WWE's main roster. During the championship match, however, Bálor suffered a legitimate shoulder injury and was forced to vacate the title the following day.

At Crown Jewel on October 31, 2019, SmackDown wrestler "The Fiend" Bray Wyatt won the Universal title by defeating Seth Rollins in a Falls Count Anywhere match that could not be stopped for any reason, thus transferring the Universal Championship to SmackDown. The WWE Championship was subsequently transferred to Raw after reigning champion Brock Lesnar quit SmackDown the following day, taking the title to Raw.

At WrestleMania 38 Night 2 on April 3, 2022, reigning Universal Champion Roman Reigns defeated Raw's WWE Champion Brock Lesnar in a Winner Takes All match to claim both championships and become recognized as the Undisputed WWE Universal Champion. WWE had billed the match as a championship unification match; however, both titles remained independently active with Reigns being a double champion, defending both titles together across both brands as the Undisputed WWE Universal Championship. On the April 24, 2023, episode of Raw, WWE Chief Content Officer Paul "Triple H" Levesque announced that regardless of what brand Reigns was drafted to in the 2023 WWE Draft, he and his undisputed championship would become exclusive to that brand. Triple H subsequently unveiled a new World Heavyweight Championship for the opposing brand, which was won by Seth "Freakin" Rollins at Night of Champions. As Reigns was drafted to SmackDown, the World Heavyweight Championship became exclusive to Raw.

On the June 2, 2023, episode of SmackDown, Triple H presented Reigns with a new singular championship belt to represent the Undisputed WWE Universal Championship. Amidst confusion of the lineages, Fightful reported that WWE confirmed to them that the two championships were still in fact separate lineages despite there being only one belt and that the plan was that the Universal Championship would be retired after Reigns lost the title. However, after Cody Rhodes defeated Reigns at WrestleMania XL in April 2024, he was also recognized as both the WWE Champion and Universal Champion, although the title began to be referred to as the Undisputed WWE Championship. This would continue until Rhodes lost the title to John Cena at WrestleMania 41 in April 2025. Upon Rhodes's loss, the Universal Championship's title history was amended to officially retire the championship. Rhodes was also removed as a former title holder with Reigns instead recognized as the final champion with his reign ending at WrestleMania XL. The WWE Championship continued to be referred to as the Undisputed WWE Championship, although it very briefly dropped the "undisputed" moniker when Rhodes regained the title from Cena in the main event of Night 2 of SummerSlam on August 3, 2025.

== Brand designation ==
The following is a list of dates indicating the transitions of the WWE Universal Championship between the Raw and SmackDown brands.

Date of transition	Brand	Notes
July 25, 2016	Raw	The championship was established for Raw after WWE Champion Dean Ambrose was drafted to SmackDown in the 2016 WWE Draft. Finn Bálor subsequently became the inaugural Universal Champion at SummerSlam on August 21.
October 31, 2019	SmackDown	The Universal Championship moved to SmackDown after "The Fiend" Bray Wyatt, a member of the SmackDown brand, defeated Seth Rollins in a Falls Count Anywhere match that could not be stopped for any reason to win the Universal Championship at Crown Jewel.
April 3, 2022	N/A	On Night 2 of WrestleMania 38, Universal Champion Roman Reigns defeated WWE Champion Brock Lesnar in a Winner Takes All match to become recognized as the Undisputed WWE Universal Champion with both title lineages still remaining active. While the Universal Championship was still technically SmackDown's world title, as Undisputed WWE Universal Champion, Reigns was allowed to appear on both brands and defend the Undisputed title against challengers from both shows.
April 28, 2023	SmackDown	On Night 1 of the 2023 WWE Draft, Roman Reigns was drafted to SmackDown, making both titles under the Undisputed WWE Universal Championship exclusive to SmackDown. The new World Heavyweight Championship was subsequently designated to Raw. The Universal Championship was then officially retired upon Reigns's loss at WrestleMania XL Night 2 on April 7, 2024, while the WWE Championship's lineage would continue under the name Undisputed WWE Championship.

== Championship belt designs ==
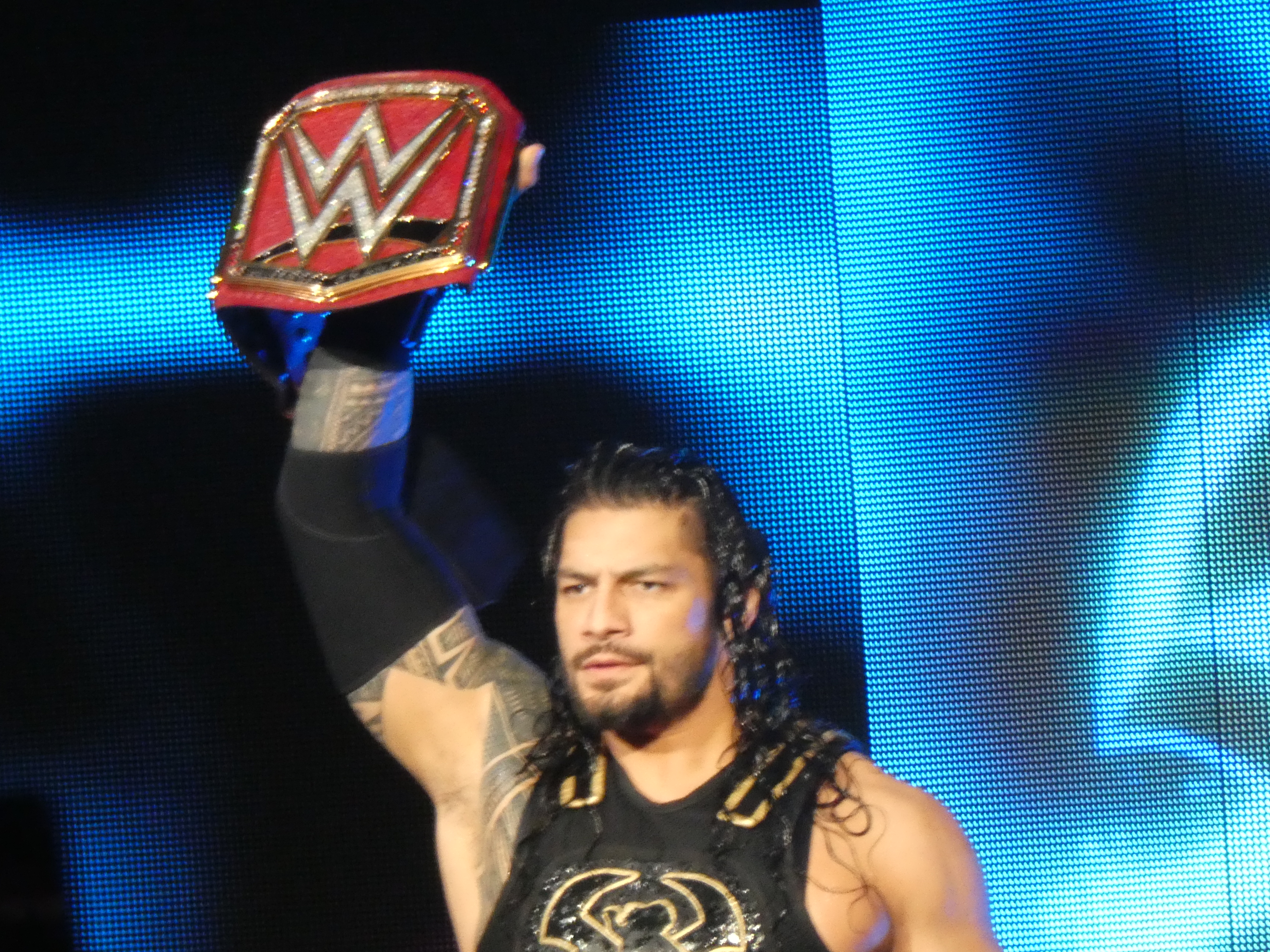
Two-time and final champion Roman Reigns in his first reign with the original Raw version of the championship belt used from 2016 to 2019

The Universal Championship belt was one of a number of WWE world titles to use the "Network Logo" design of the WWE Championship belt introduced in 2014, with a few notable differences. Like the WWE Championship belt, the center plate was a large cut out of the WWE logo with diamonds sitting inside an irregular heptagonal plate, with the words "Universal Champion" in small capital letters sitting underneath the logo. There were gold divider bars that separated the center plate from two side plates. Each side plate featured the same default removable center section as the WWE Championship (the WWE logo over a red globe), which could be customized with the champion's logo. The most prominent difference was the belt's leather strap, the color of which indicated the brand it was exclusive to. When the belt was first unveiled at SummerSlam 2016, the strap was red to symbolize its exclusivity to the Raw brand and the underline of the WWE logo on the center plate was black to make it visible (essentially the reverse of the WWE Championship belt). After the title became exclusive to SmackDown in late 2019, Bray Wyatt introduced a blue strap variation and the underline of the WWE logo was changed from black to red.

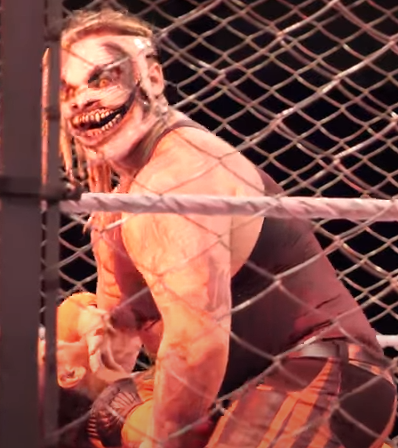
Two-time champion Bray Wyatt, shown here as "The Fiend", whose custom version of the Universal Championship belt was based on his mask

In addition to the SmackDown version of the belt, Bray Wyatt also introduced a custom version of the championship for his "Fiend" character on the November 29 episode of SmackDown. The custom belt featured The Fiend's face in the place of the center plate. The character's phrases "Hurt" and "Heal" were written in red on black leather strips in the place of side plates while the strap of the belt itself was red and black worn leather with red stitching holding it together. The character's phrase "Let Me In" was also included. Wyatt used both the standard and custom versions of the championship during his first reign (2019–2020); his cheery Firefly Fun House character held the standard blue belt, while his sinister Fiend character held the custom belt.

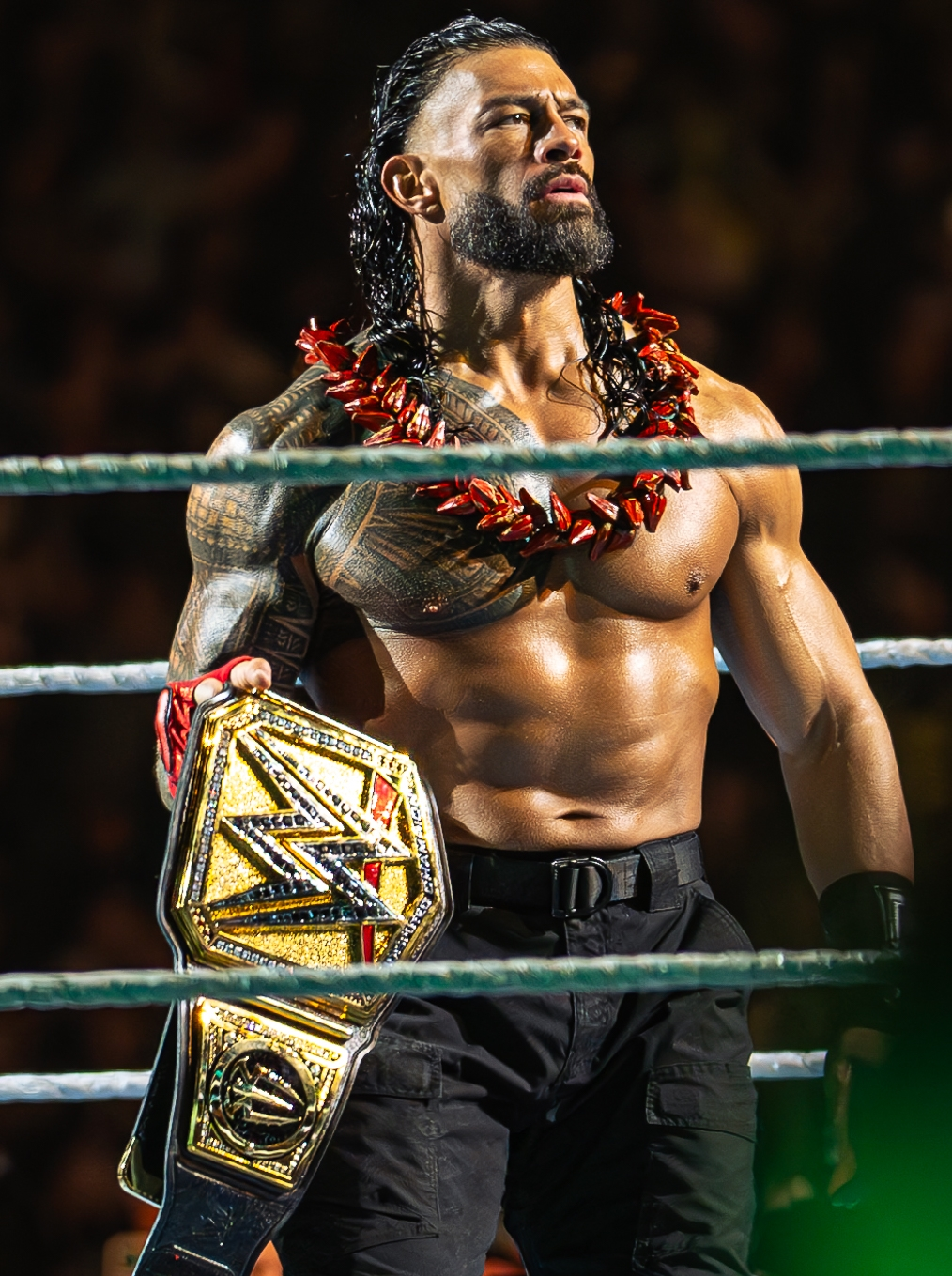
Roman Reigns as the Undisputed WWE Universal Champion, which represented both the Universal and WWE Championships. He became undisputed champion during his second Universal Championship reign, which was the longest reign for the title at 1,316 days and the fourth longest world championship reign in WWE history.

After Roman Reigns became the Undisputed WWE Universal Champion at WrestleMania 38 in April 2022, both the Universal Championship and WWE Championship belts were used in tandem to represent the undisputed title, although both titles retained their individual lineages. On the June 2, 2023, episode of SmackDown, in celebration of Reigns reaching 1,000 days as Universal Champion, he was presented with a new single title belt to represent the Undisputed WWE Universal Championship. Retaining the "Network Logo" design with the same custom side plates but on a black strap, the WWE logo was now encrusted with black gems, the textured background was made gold and made as part of the metal plate instead of the underlying leather, and the text at the bottom of the plate was changed to "Undisputed Champion". Despite this, his manager Paul Heyman had continued to carry around the previous Universal and WWE Championship belts until the end of July. On WWE's website, pictures of the previous title belts were still used for the individual title histories of each championship until April 2024 when the Undisputed Championship belt replaced the image for the WWE Championship; the Universal Championship title history remained a picture of the previous blue belt. After the retirement of the Universal Championship, the Undisputed belt would continue to be used for the WWE Championship, which also continued to be referred to as the Undisputed WWE Championship.

== Reception ==
The original red Universal Championship design was heavily criticized. Jason Powell of Pro Wrestling Dot Net referred to it as "a title belt that no one likes". Adam Silverstein of CBS Sports described it as "ugly" while the live SummerSlam audience in Brooklyn, New York gave derisive chants, including "This belt sucks", an assessment with which New England Sports Network reporters agreed. That site's Ricky Doyle wrote that the crowd response turned what should have been a "landmark moment for the company" into an "awkward experience". Mike Johnson of Pro Wrestling Insider felt the title looked like a "xerox" of the WWE Championship and did not blame the audience for reacting negatively. The design was also unpopular with online wrestling fans.

WWE employees responded in the aftermath of the title's debut. Seth Rollins chastised the SummerSlam crowd's reaction, writing on Twitter: "More important than a title's appearance is what it represents for the men fighting over it. You really let me down tonight, Brooklyn". While acknowledging that he himself might have chosen a different belt design, Mick Foley echoed Rollins's response in a lengthy Facebook post. He recalled being presented with the WWF Hardcore Championship, a title belt made of broken metal pieces held together by duct tape, which challengers "made ... mean something by busting [their] asses". In a kayfabe promo on the following episode of Raw, the then-villainous Rollins called the championship belt "beautiful".

Later in 2016, Jim Vorel of Paste ranked the title as the worst of the nine then contested in WWE, noting its "obnoxious" design. On the other hand, Nick Schwartz of Fox Sports wrote: "It's really not as bad as fans made it seem at SummerSlam. It's fine".

== Reigns ==
Over the title's near eight-year history, there were officially 14 reigns between 8 champions and two vacancies. Finn Bálor was the inaugural champion. Brock Lesnar had the most reigns at three. Roman Reigns's second reign was the longest singular reign at 1,316 days, while Bálor had the shortest reign at 1 day (less than a day as recognized by WWE) as he was forced to vacate the title due to suffering a legitimate injury in winning it. Reigns also held the title for the longest combined days at 1,380 days (1,379 days as recognized by WWE). Kevin Owens was the youngest champion when he won it at 32 years, 114 days old, while Goldberg was the oldest when he won the title for a second time at 53. The final recognized champion was Reigns.

Name	Years
WWE Universal Championship	July 25, 2016 – April 7, 2024
Undisputed WWE Universal Championship (Note: When defended with the WWE Championship.)	April 3, 2022 – April 7, 2024

Key
No.	Overall reign number
Reign	Reign number for the specific champion
Days	Number of days held
Days recog.	Number of days held recognized by the promotion
†	Championship change is unrecognized by the promotion
<1	Reign lasted less than a day

No.	Champion	Championship change			Reign statistics			Notes	Ref.
No.	Champion	Date	Event	Location	Reign	Days	Days recog.	Notes	Ref.
WWE: Raw
1	Finn Bálor	August 21, 2016	SummerSlam	Brooklyn, NY	1	1	<1	The title was established for Raw after the WWE Championship became exclusive to SmackDown following the 2016 WWE Draft. Bálor defeated Seth Rollins in a pinfall and submission-only match to become the inaugural champion.	
—	Vacated	August 22, 2016	Raw	Brooklyn, NY	—	—	—	Vacated due to Finn Bálor suffering a legit shoulder injury during his match at SummerSlam.	
2	Kevin Owens	August 29, 2016	Raw	Houston, TX	1	188	188	This was a fatal four-way elimination match for the vacant title also involving Big Cass, Roman Reigns, and Seth Rollins, who Owens last eliminated to win.	
3	Goldberg	March 5, 2017	Fastlane	Milwaukee, WI	1	28	27		
4	Brock Lesnar	April 2, 2017	WrestleMania 33	Orlando, FL	1	504	503		
5	Roman Reigns	August 19, 2018	SummerSlam	Brooklyn, NY	1	64	63		
—	Vacated	October 22, 2018	Raw	Providence, RI	—	—	—	Vacated after Roman Reigns announced that he had been legitimately diagnosed with a recurrence leukemia.	
6	Brock Lesnar	November 2, 2018	Crown Jewel	Riyadh, Saudi Arabia	2	156	156	Originally scheduled as a triple threat match in which Roman Reigns was to defend the title against Lesnar and Braun Strowman. After Reigns relinquished the championship, the match became a singles match between Lesnar and Strowman for the vacant title.	
7	Seth Rollins	April 7, 2019	WrestleMania 35	East Rutherford, NJ	1	98	98		
8	Brock Lesnar	July 14, 2019	Extreme Rules	Philadelphia, PA	3	28	27	This was Lesnar's Money in the Bank cash-in match.	
9	Seth Rollins	August 11, 2019	SummerSlam	Toronto, ON, Canada	2	81	80		
10	"The Fiend" Bray Wyatt	October 31, 2019	Crown Jewel	Riyadh, Saudi Arabia	1	119	118	This was a Falls Count Anywhere match that could not be stopped for any reason. The title became exclusive to the SmackDown brand due to Wyatt's status as a SmackDown wrestler.	
WWE: SmackDown
11	Goldberg	February 27, 2020	Super ShowDown	Riyadh, Saudi Arabia	2	27–28	37	WWE recognizes this reign as ending on April 4, 2020, when the following match aired on tape delay.	
12	Braun Strowman	March 25–26, 2020	WrestleMania 36; Part 1	Orlando, FL	1	150–151	141	WrestleMania was taped on March 25 and 26, but it is currently unknown which day this match was taped. WWE recognizes this reign as beginning on April 4, 2020, when the match aired on tape delay.	
13	"The Fiend" Bray Wyatt	August 23, 2020	SummerSlam	Orlando, FL	2	7	6	This was a Falls Count Anywhere match.	
14	Roman Reigns	August 30, 2020	Payback	Orlando, FL	2	1,316	1,316	This was a No Holds Barred triple threat match also involving Braun Strowman, who Reigns pinned. At WrestleMania 38 on April 3, 2022, Reigns defeated Raw's WWE Champion Brock Lesnar in a Winner Takes All match. Despite the match being billed as a unification match, both titles remained independently active and were collectively referred to as the Undisputed WWE Universal Championship. In April 2023, a new World Heavyweight Championship was established and designated to Raw after Reigns was drafted to SmackDown in the 2023 WWE Draft.	
†	Cody Rhodes	April 7, 2024	WrestleMania XL; Night 2	Philadelphia, PA	—	378	—	This was a Bloodline Rules match in which Reigns also defended the WWE Championship. Rhodes won the title as a member of the Raw brand and was subsequently transferred to SmackDown. The undisputed title's name was also truncated to Undisputed WWE Championship. The official title history had originally recognized Rhodes as champion up until Rhodes lost the title at WrestleMania 41 to John Cena the following year.	
—	Deactivated	April 7, 2024	WrestleMania XL; Night 2	Philadelphia, PA	—	—	—	Decommissioned in favor of continuing the WWE Championship lineage. Following Roman Reigns' loss, the official title history had originally recognized Cody Rhodes as champion up until Rhodes lost the title at WrestleMania 41 to John Cena the following year. Upon his loss, the official title history was amended, removing Rhodes and instead recognizing Reigns as the final champion with the title retired the night he lost it at WrestleMania XL.	

== Combined reigns ==
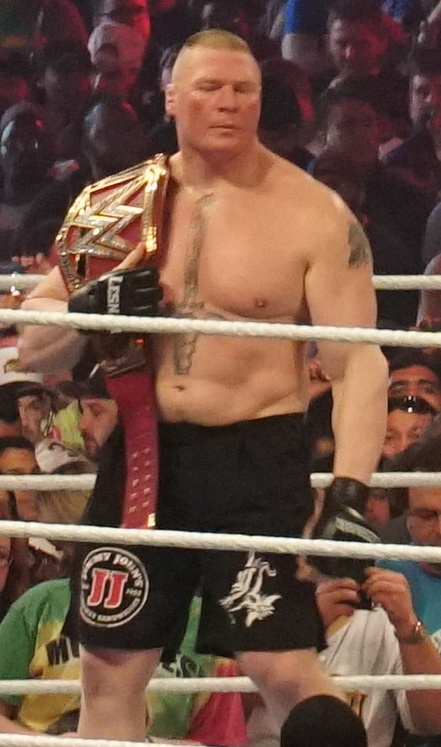
Record three-time champion Brock Lesnar, shown here in his first reign with the original Raw version of the championship belt

¤	The exact length of at least one title reign is uncertain, so the shortest length is considered.
<1	Reign lasted less than a day

Rank	Wrestler	No. of reigns	Combined days	Combined days rec. by WWE
1	Roman Reigns	2	1,380	1,379
2	Brock Lesnar	3	688	686
—	Cody Rhodes	1	378	—
3	Kevin Owens	1	188	
4	Seth Rollins	2	179	178
5	Braun Strowman	1	¤150	141
6	"The Fiend" Bray Wyatt	2	126	124
7	Goldberg	2	¤55	64
8	Finn Bálor	1	1	<1

== See also ==
- List of former championships in WWE
- World championships in WWE
