= World championships in WWE =

Listing of men's professional wrestling world championships

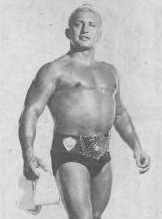
WWE's inaugural world champion Buddy Rogers, who became the WWWF World Heavyweight Champion in 1963, a title that is now known as the Undisputed WWE Championship.

The American professional wrestling promotion WWE has maintained several men's world championships since Capitol Wrestling Corporation seceded from the National Wrestling Alliance in 1963 to become the World Wide Wrestling Federation (WWWF), which was later subjected to various name changes, including World Wrestling Federation (WWF) and World Wrestling Entertainment (WWE)—in April 2011, the company ceased using its full name and has since just been referred to as WWE. The company's first world championship was the WWE Championship, which was established along with the promotion's creation in 1963 as the WWWF World Heavyweight Championship; it is still active as the Undisputed WWE Championship and is WWE's oldest active title. Whenever the WWE brand extension has been implemented (2002–2011; 2016–present), separate world championships have been created or allocated for each brand.

As of 2026, WWE promotes two men's world championships, with the Undisputed WWE Championship on the SmackDown brand and the World Heavyweight Championship on Raw. The NXT Championship (created in 2012) was considered as the world championship for the NXT brand from 2019 until 2021 when it was viewed as a third major brand, although it reverted to its status as a developmental championship in 2021. WWE also promotes one other world championship, the AAA Mega Championship of Lucha Libre AAA Worldwide (AAA), as WWE acquired AAA in April 2025, but AAA is largely promoted independently from WWE's programming with only occasional crossover.

== Overview ==
=== World Championships ===
No.	Name	Years	Status
1	WWE Championship	1963–present	Active
2	WCW World Heavyweight Championship	1991–2001 (became WWF property in 2001)	Unified with the WWE Championship
3	ECW World Heavyweight Championship	1992–2001, 2006–2010 (became WWE property in 2003)	Retired
4	World Heavyweight Championship (original version)	2002–2013	Unified with the WWE Championship
5	WWE Universal Championship	2016–2024 (Note: The years the title was officially active per WWE; however, WWE did not acknowledge the championship's retirement until 2025.)	Unified with the WWE Championship in 2022, subsequently retired 2024.
6	World Heavyweight Championship (current version)	2023–present	Active

== Summary of championships ==
=== WWE Championship (1963–present) ===
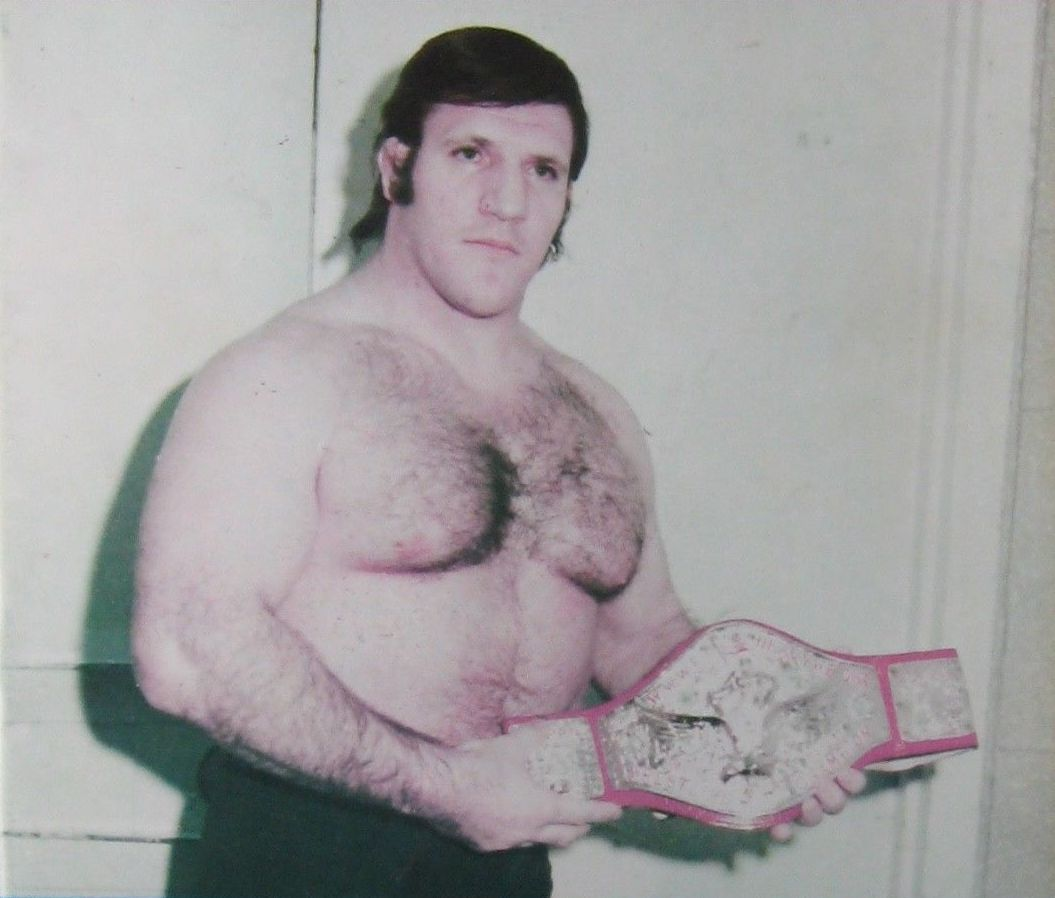
Bruno Sammartino defeated inaugural champion Buddy Rogers and became the longest-reigning champion at 2,803 days; pictured here in his second reign with the then-WWWF Heavyweight Championship (now WWE Championship)

The WWE Championship, also referred to as the Undisputed WWE Championship since April 2024, is the original world heavyweight championship of WWE, currently defended on the SmackDown brand. It was established by the then-World Wide Wrestling Federation (WWWF) on April 25, 1963, as the WWWF World Heavyweight Championship, after Capitol Wrestling Corporation seceded from the National Wrestling Alliance (NWA) to become the WWWF following a dispute over the NWA World Heavyweight Championship. The inaugural champion was Buddy Rogers. Since its inception, the title has undergone many name changes due to company name changes and title unifications. The WWWF was renamed to World Wrestling Federation (WWF) in 1979, and then World Wrestling Entertainment (WWE) in 2002; starting in April 2011, the company began to operate under the trade name of WWE, although the legal name is still the full unabbreviated name.

The WWE Championship is the oldest championship currently active in WWE and is presented as being the promotion's most prestigious title. Aside from company name changes that resulted in the championship being renamed accordingly, the most notable name changes were from championship unifications. These included the WWE Undisputed Championship, the WWE World Heavyweight Championship, and the Undisputed WWE Universal Championship. After the retirement of the Universal Championship in April 2024, the WWE Championship has been referred to as the Undisputed WWE Championship.

==== WWE Undisputed Championship (2001–2002) ====
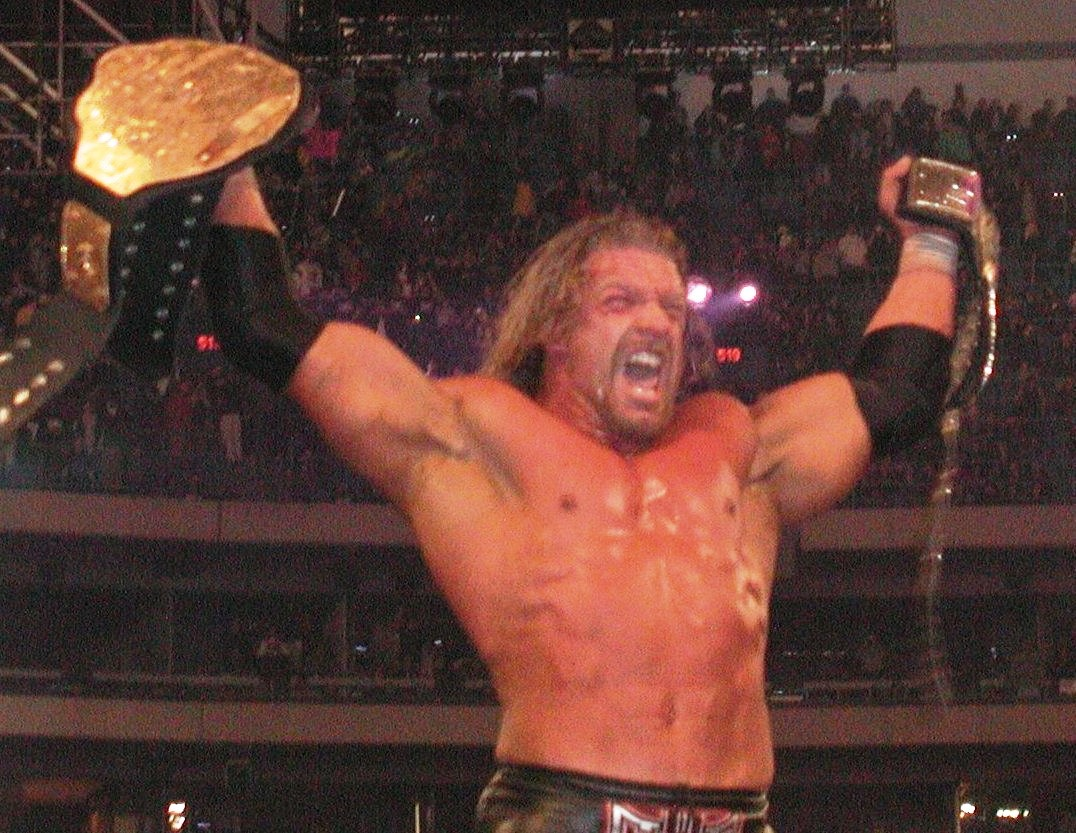
Triple H after winning the Undisputed WWF Championship (now WWE Championship) at WrestleMania X8; the former WCW Championship (left) and WWF Championship belts represented the unified title until a single belt was presented to Triple H in April 2002; later that same year in September, Triple H became the inaugural World Heavyweight Champion (original), which also used the Big Gold Belt design that had represented the WCW Championship.

The WWE Undisputed Championship (formerly known as the Undisputed WWF Championship and as the Undisputed WWE Championship) was the result of a unification of the then-WWF Championship and the World Championship (formerly WCW Championship) in December 2001. Earlier that year in March, the WWF acquired World Championship Wrestling (WCW), which shortly after began The Invasion storyline, a war between the WWF and the combined faction of former WCW and Extreme Championship Wrestling (ECW) wrestlers called The Alliance. This culminated at Survivor Series in November where the WWF won The Invasion war, disbanding The Alliance. The WCW Championship was subsequently renamed World Championship. As there was not a need for two world championships, a unification match was scheduled for Vengeance the following month. At the event, "Stone Cold" Steve Austin defeated Kurt Angle to retain the WWF Championship, while Chris Jericho defeated The Rock for the World Championship. After this, Jericho defeated Austin, unifying the WWF and World Championships, and becoming the first Undisputed WWF Champion; the Undisputed Championship retained the lineage of the WWF Championship while the World Championship was retired.

After the company was renamed to WWE, the championship was renamed Undisputed WWE Championship and then WWE Undisputed Championship. With the introduction of the WWE brand extension in March 2002, the company split its roster into two brands, Raw and SmackDown, where wrestlers were exclusively assigned to perform. The holder of the Undisputed Championship was the only male wrestler allowed to appear on both brands, as the champion defended the title against challengers from both brands. However, in September 2002, after reigning champion Brock Lesnar signed an exclusive deal to only defend the title on SmackDown, the title dropped the "undisputed" moniker, becoming the WWE Championship, while Raw established the original World Heavyweight Championship as its counterpart, spun off from the Undisputed WWE Championship as the successor to the WCW World Heavyweight Championship.

==== WWE World Heavyweight Championship (2013–2016) ====
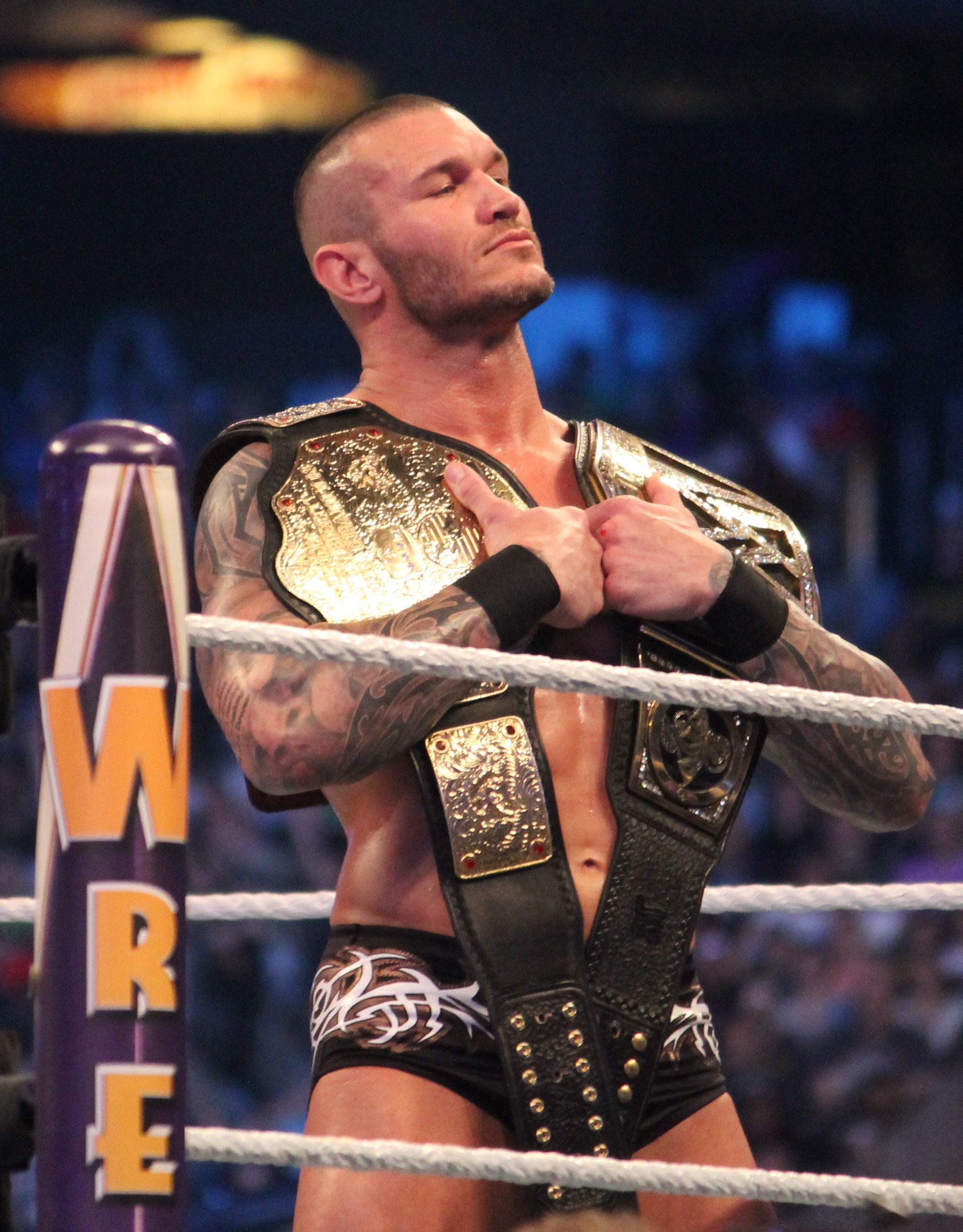
Randy Orton unified the World Heavyweight Championship (original) with the WWE Championship in December 2013, retiring the former and renaming the latter to WWE World Heavyweight Championship (which reverted to WWE Championship in 2016); the two belts represented the unified title until a single belt was presented to Brock Lesnar in August 2014.

The WWE World Heavyweight Championship was the result of a unification of the WWE Championship and the original World Heavyweight Championship in December 2013. Following the end of the first brand extension in August 2011, both the WWE Champion and World Heavyweight Champion could appear on both Raw and SmackDown. After two years, as there was no longer a need for two world championships in the company, reigning World Heavyweight Champion John Cena made a challenge to reigning WWE Champion Randy Orton to determine WWE's undisputed world champion. Orton subsequently defeated Cena in a Tables, Ladders, and Chairs match at the TLC: Tables, Ladders & Chairs pay-per-view on December 15, 2013, to become the WWE World Heavyweight Champion. The WWE World Heavyweight Championship retained the lineage of the WWE Championship while the World Heavyweight Championship was retired.

After Dean Ambrose won the WWE World Heavyweight Championship at Money in the Bank on June 19, 2016, one week later on June 27, the title's name reverted to WWE Championship. After the reintroduction of the brand extension the following month, the title became exclusive to SmackDown and was renamed to WWE World Championship, although it reverted to WWE Championship in December 2016.

==== Undisputed WWE Universal Championship (2022–2024) ====
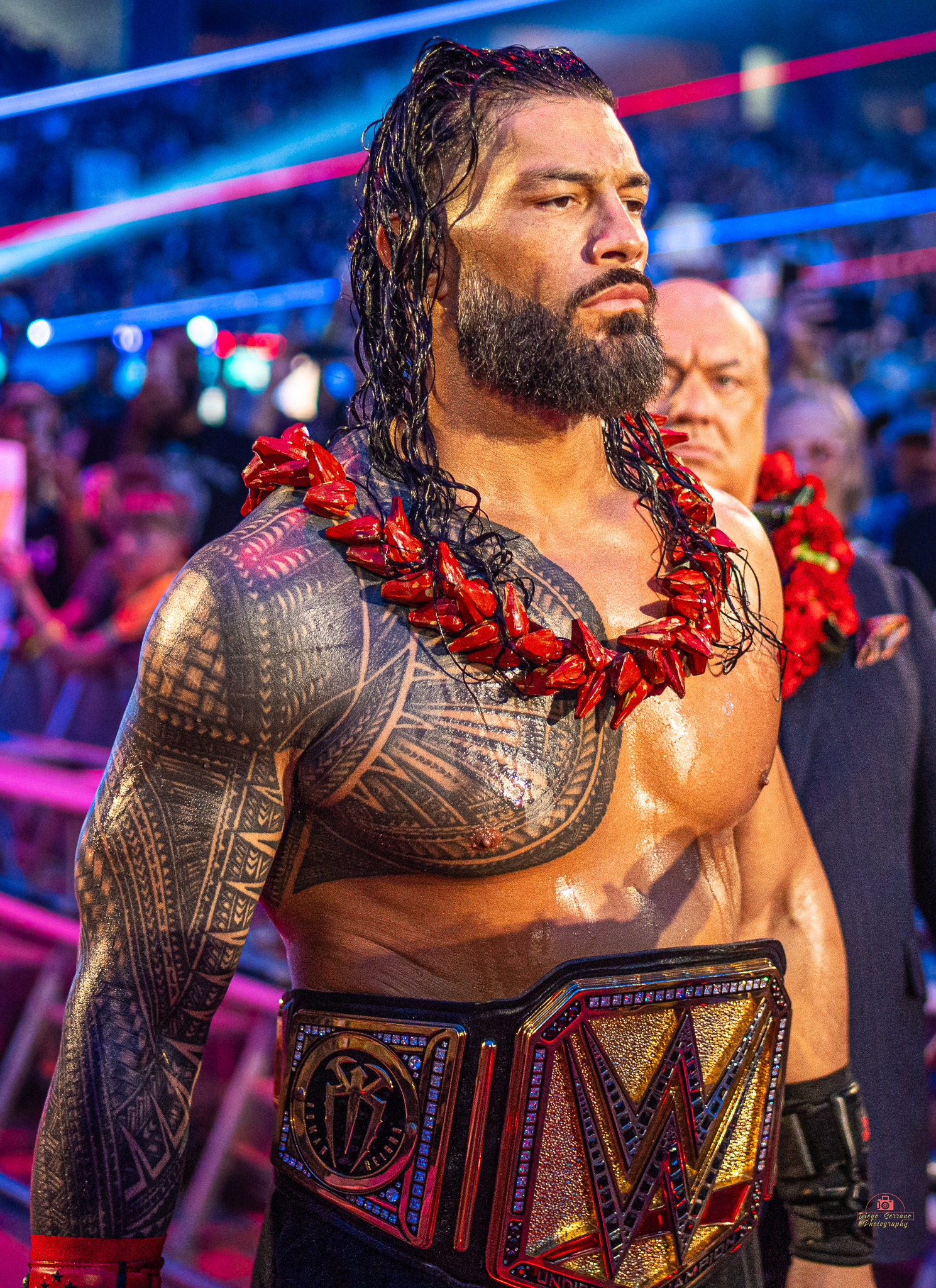
Roman Reigns with the Undisputed WWE Universal Championship belt. Initially, he carried both the WWE and Universal Championship belts, but in June 2023, he was presented with a single championship belt representing both titles. Since April 2025, this belt now solely represents the WWE Championship, following the deactivation of the Universal Championship.

The Undisputed WWE Universal Championship was the term used by WWE to refer to both the WWE Championship and the Universal Championship being held and defended simultaneously by the same individual. This recognition came as a result of a Winner Takes All match at WrestleMania 38 in April 2022. WWE billed the match as a championship unification match though both titles maintained their individual lineages. At WrestleMania 38, SmackDown's Universal Champion Roman Reigns defeated Raw's WWE Champion Brock Lesnar to win the latter's title and become recognized as the Undisputed WWE Universal Champion. As the undisputed champion, Reigns was allowed to appear on both brands; as a result of the 2023 WWE Draft, he was drafted to SmackDown, thus making both championships under the Undisputed WWE Universal Championship banner exclusive to the brand. A new world title, the World Heavyweight Championship, was created and subsequently designated to Raw.

On the June 2, 2023, episode of SmackDown, in celebration of Reigns reaching 1,000 days as Universal Champion, he was presented with a single belt, which features the same "Network Logo" design of the individual titles, but with notable differences. It is on a black strap, the WWE logo is encrusted with black gem stones, the background behind the logo is gold with nugget texturing, and the text at the bottom of the plate says "Undisputed Champion", while the side plates featured Reigns' logo. His manager Paul Heyman had continued to carry around the standard WWE and Universal Championship belts until the end of July. Cody Rhodes would defeat Reigns at WrestleMania XL Night 2 on April 7, 2024, to win the title. Following Rhodes's victory, WWE truncated the name to Undisputed WWE Championship. Up until April 20, 2025, WWE had also recognized Rhodes as Universal Champion, but upon his loss at WrestleMania 41, the Universal Championship's history was amended, removing Rhodes, with its lineage to have ended upon Reigns's defeat at WrestleMania XL and Reigns recognized as the final Universal Champion.

=== WCW Championship (1991–2001) ===
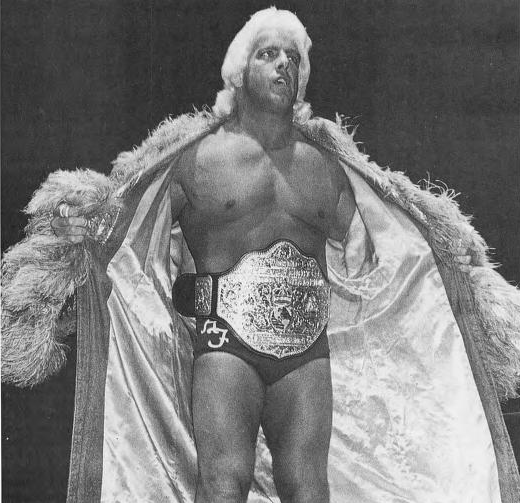
The inaugural WCW World Heavyweight Champion Ric Flair

The WCW World Heavyweight Championship was originally the world championship of World Championship Wrestling (WCW), and later, defended on the then-WWF's programs. The title was established in 1991 when WCW, a member of the NWA, created the title to replace the NWA's world championship and claimed reigning NWA World Heavyweight Champion Ric Flair as the inaugural WCW World Heavyweight Champion. Flair's Big Gold Belt simultaneously represented the world championships of both the NWA and WCW until the NWA dropped its recognition of Flair as their champion when Flair left WCW with the Big Gold Belt and joined the WWF. Flair subsequently began appearing on WWF television with the Big Gold Belt, calling himself "The Real World Champion"; however, this was never officially recognized as a world championship in WWF.

In 1993, WCW seceded from the NWA and grew to become a rival promotion to the WWF. Both organizations grew into mainstream prominence and were eventually involved in a television ratings war, dubbed the Monday Night Wars. Near the end of the ratings war, WCW began a financial decline, which culminated in WWF purchasing WCW in March 2001. As a result of the purchase, the WWF acquired, among other assets, WCW's championships. Thus, there were two world championships in the WWF: the original WWF Championship and the WCW World Heavyweight Championship, which was shortened to WCW Championship upon WWF's acquisition and was eventually renamed the "World Championship" in November. The World Championship was then retired when it was unified into the WWF Championship at Vengeance in December 2001, with the WWF Championship becoming the Undisputed WWF Championship. Chris Jericho was the final WCW Champion.

=== World Heavyweight Championship (2002–2013) ===
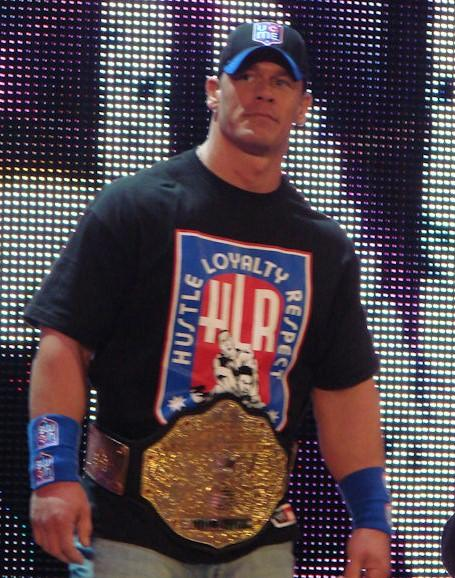
John Cena with the World Heavyweight Championship. The title was represented by a design based on the Big Gold Belt that incorporated the WWE logo.

The original World Heavyweight Championship was the second world championship to be established by WWE, which occurred in September 2002. After WWE introduced the WWE brand extension in March 2002, the Undisputed Champion was the only male wrestler allowed to appear on both the Raw and SmackDown brands. However, after reigning WWE Undisputed Champion Brock Lesnar signed an exclusive deal to only appear on SmackDown, Raw was left without a world championship. The World Heavyweight Championship was subsequently established and awarded to Triple H, who was originally the number one contender to Lesnar's championship, which dropped the "undisputed" moniker.

Throughout the first brand split (2002–2011), the original World Heavyweight Championship and WWE Championship switched brands, usually as a result of the WWE Draft. The brand extension was dissolved in August 2011, allowing the World Heavyweight Champion and WWE Champion to appear on both brands. With no longer a need for two world championships, the World Heavyweight Championship was retired when it was unified into the WWE Championship at TLC: Tables, Ladders & Chairs in December 2013, with the WWE Championship becoming the WWE World Heavyweight Championship. Randy Orton was the final holder of the original World Heavyweight Championship.

=== ECW Championship (1992–2010) ===
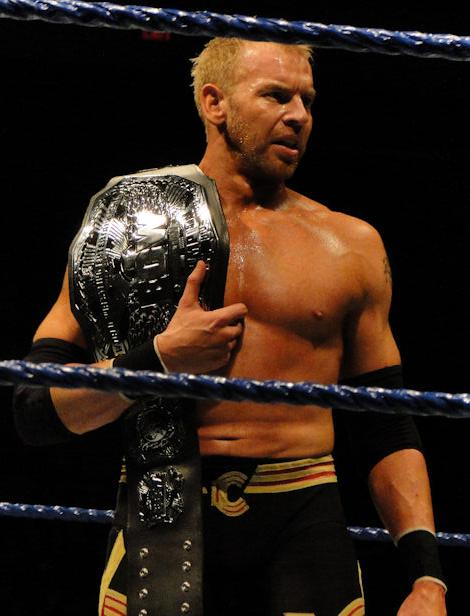
Christian with the final belt design of the ECW Championship used in WWE

The ECW World Heavyweight Championship was originally the world championship of Extreme Championship Wrestling (ECW) and later WWE's ECW brand. In 1992, Eastern Championship Wrestling seceded from the NWA and became Extreme Championship Wrestling and established the ECW World Heavyweight Championship with WWE recognizing Shane Douglas as the inaugural champion. The championship itself had originally been established as the ECW Heavyweight Championship in 1992 for the previous Eastern Championship Wrestling with Jimmy Snuka as the inaugural champion; however, WWE only recognizes the title history from its change over to Extreme Championship Wrestling. In 2001, the ECW promotion folded due to bankruptcy and WWE bought the assets of ECW in 2003.

In June 2006, WWE established a third brand dubbed ECW on which stars from the former promotion and newer talent competed. When ECW's Rob Van Dam won the WWE Championship at ECW One Night Stand, the ECW Championship was subsequently reactivated as the world championship of the ECW brand (and the third concurrently active world championship in WWE) and was awarded to Van Dam, who held both until he lost the WWE Championship to Raw's Edge the following month. The three world championships at one point or another switched brands over the course of the brand extension, usually as a result of the WWE Draft. The ECW brand was disbanded in 2010, subsequently retiring the ECW Championship. The final champion was Ezekiel Jackson.

The status of the title as world championship has been retconed several times in WWE. Despite WWE not recognizing any title reign before 1994, WWE.com describes The Sandman as a 5 time world champion (his first reign took place in 1992). In 2007, WWE shortened the name from ECW World Championship to ECW Championship. Despite the change, when Matt Hardy won the title in 2008, WWE.com labeled as a world title. In 2026, after CM Punk won the World Heavyweight Championship, WWE described him as an 8-time world champion, not counting the ECW title.

=== WWE Universal Championship (2016–2024) ===
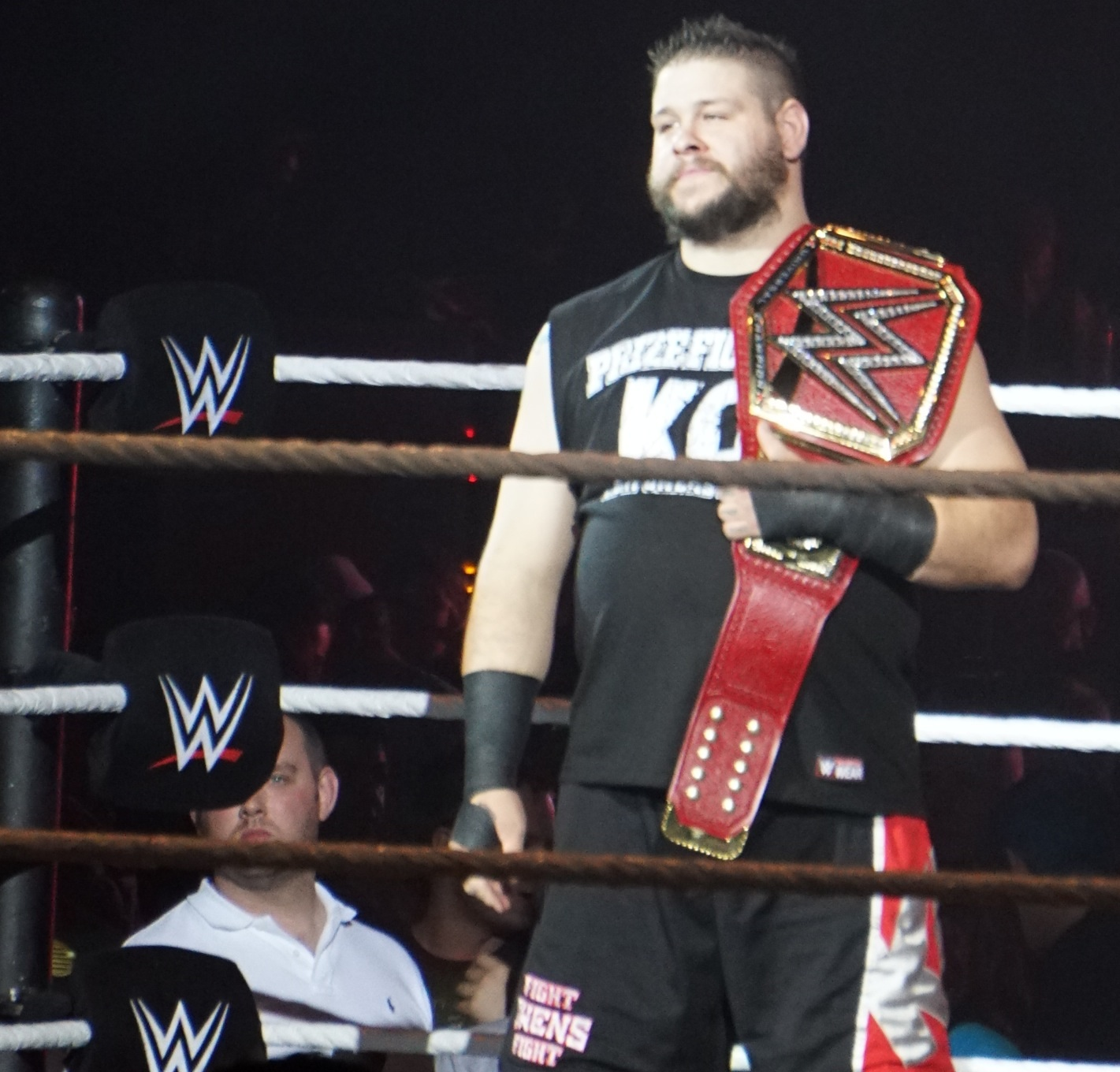
Kevin Owens with the original Raw version of the championship belt used from 2016 to 2019

The WWE Universal Championship was created as a result of the reintroduction of the brand extension in July 2016. On the July 25 episode of Raw, to address the lack of a world championship for the brand since the WWE Championship became exclusive to SmackDown, the Universal Championship was introduced. Finn Bálor subsequently became the inaugural champion at SummerSlam the following month. The titles would switch brands following the events of the 2019 Crown Jewel pay-per-view.

At WrestleMania 38 in April 2022, Universal Champion Roman Reigns defeated WWE Champion Brock Lesnar in a Winner Takes All match for both titles, becoming the Undisputed WWE Universal Champion. Although WWE promoted the bout as a championship unification match, both titles maintained their separate lineages and were defended together under the "Undisputed" banner. Reigns held both championships concurrently until WrestleMania XL in April 2024, where he lost the Undisputed title to Cody Rhodes. Initially, Rhodes was listed on WWE.com as the reigning Universal Champion. However, following John Cena's victory over Rhodes for the Undisputed title at WrestleMania 41, WWE retroactively updated the title histories—retiring the Universal Championship and officially recognizing Reigns as the final titleholder after his loss at WrestleMania XL.

=== NXT Championship (2019–2021) ===
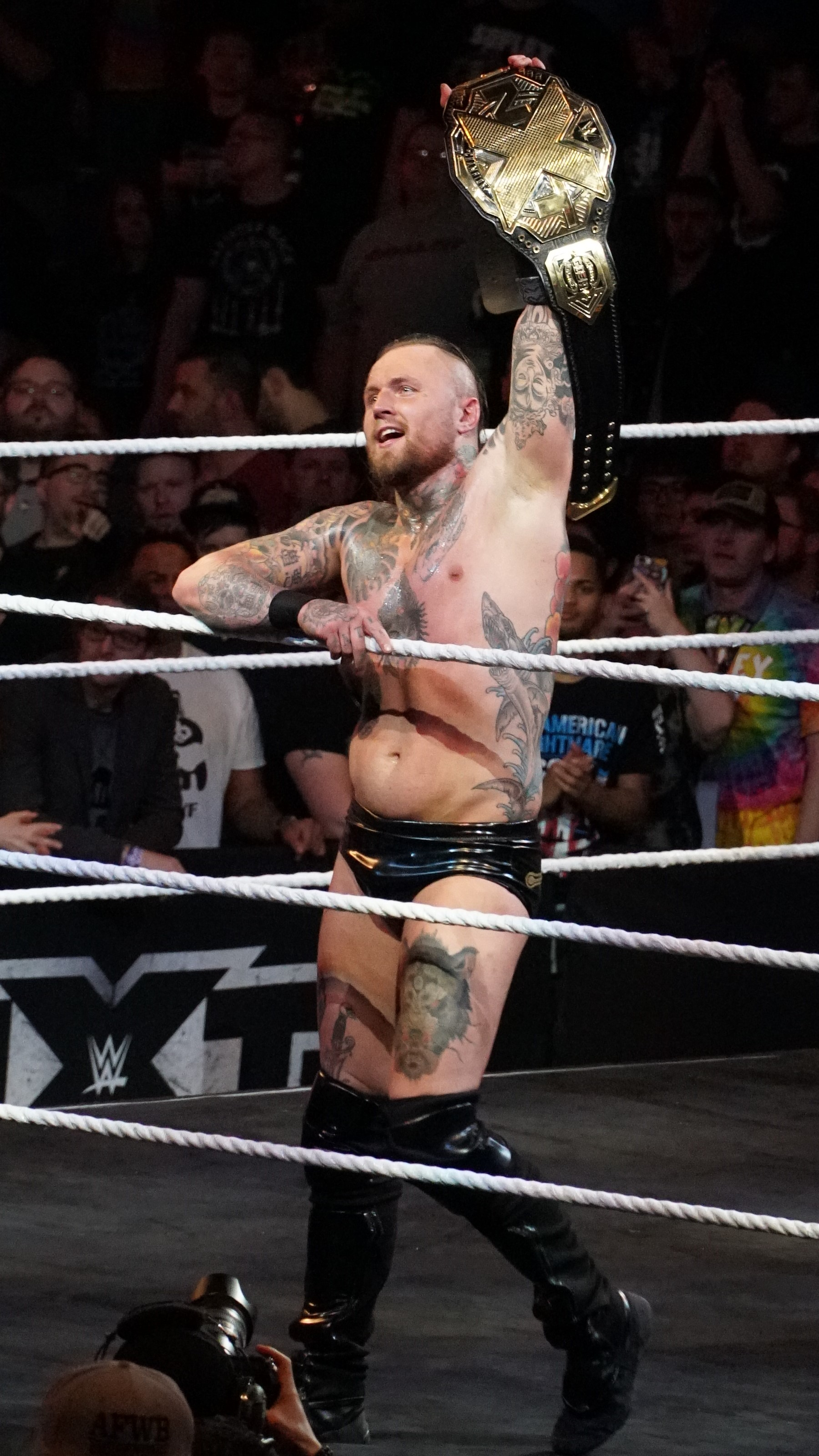
One-time champion Aleister Black with the 2017–2022 version of the championship belt

The NXT Championship is the top championship of NXT, WWE's developmental brand; however, there was a period of time from 2019 to 2021 in which NXT was regarded as WWE's third brand with the championship regarded as a world championship. In June 2012, WWE established the NXT brand as their developmental territory to replace Florida Championship Wrestling. The NXT Championship was subsequently established on July 1, 2012, and Seth Rollins defeated Jinder Mahal in the tournament finals to become the inaugural champion. In September 2019, after years of growth and expansion, the NXT brand became WWE's third major brand when the NXT program was moved to the USA Network, with the NXT Championship subsequently regarded as a world championship. However, WWE revamped NXT in September 2021 and returned the brand to its original function as a developmental brand, with the title no longer regarded as a world championship.

Ten wrestlers held the NXT Championship when it was officially recognized as a world title: Drew McIntyre, Andrade "Cien" Almas, Aleister Black, Tommaso Ciampa, Johnny Gargano, Adam Cole, Keith Lee, Karrion Kross, Finn Bálor, and Samoa Joe. Kross is the only wrestler to have held it twice as a world championship, although Bálor and Joe had both held it prior to its world title status, and Ciampa would have a second reign after NXT became NXT 2.0.

=== World Heavyweight Championship (2023–present) ===
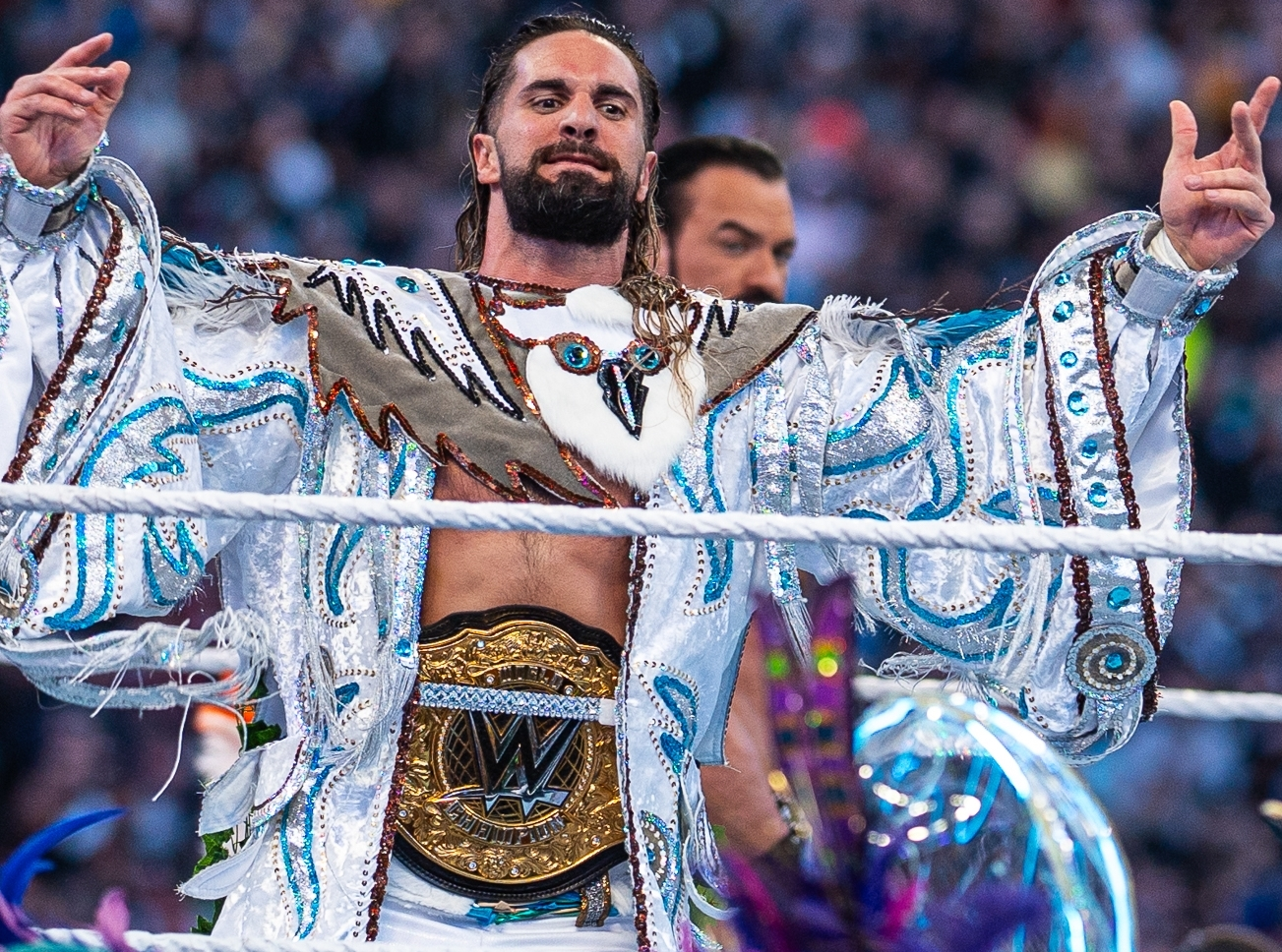
The inaugural World Heavyweight Champion Seth "Freakin" Rollins. Rollins was also the inaugural NXT Champion and is the only wrestler to have held the NXT, WWE, Universal, and World Heavyweight Championships

The World Heavyweight Championship is the fourth world championship to be established by WWE, and is currently defended on the Raw brand. Its creation came as a result of Roman Reigns, who at the time held both the WWE Championship and the Universal Championship to be recognized as the Undisputed WWE Universal Champion. On the April 24, 2023, episode of Raw, WWE Chief Content Officer Triple H announced that regardless of what brand Reigns was drafted to in the 2023 WWE Draft, he and his undisputed championship would become exclusive to that brand, with Triple H subsequently unveiling the World Heavyweight Championship for the opposing brand. During the draft, SmackDown drafted Reigns, thus the World Heavyweight Championship became exclusive to Raw. Seth "Freakin" Rollins became the inaugural champion by defeating AJ Styles in a tournament final at Night of Champions on May 27, 2023.

== Champions ==
=== Current champions ===
The following list shows the wrestlers that are currently holding all active men's world championships in WWE.

Championship	Current champion	Reign	Date won	Days held	Location	Notes	Ref.
Undisputed WWE Championship	Sami Zayn	2	September 11, 2026	64	Mexico City, Mexico	Defeated CM Punk on SmackDown.	
World Heavyweight Championship (current version)	Roman Reigns	1	April 19, 2026	209	Las Vegas, Nevada	Defeated CM Punk at WrestleMania 42 Night 2.	

=== Retired championships ===
The following list shows retired men's world championships and the final title holders before the belts were deactivated by WWE.

Championship	Final champion	Reign	Date retired	Days held	Notes
WCW World Heavyweight Championship	Chris Jericho	2	December 9, 2001	<1	Won the title as the World Championship. It was unified into the then WWF Championship, which subsequently became known as the Undisputed WWF Championship.
ECW World Heavyweight Championship	Ezekiel Jackson	1	February 16, 2010	<1	Won the title as the ECW Championship. It was retired with the dissolution of the ECW brand.
World Heavyweight Championship (original version)	Randy Orton	4	December 15, 2013	<1	The championship was unified into Orton's WWE Championship, which subsequently became known as the WWE World Heavyweight Championship.
WWE Universal Championship	Roman Reigns	2	April 7, 2024	1,316	Decommissioned in favor of continuing the WWE Championship lineage. Following Reigns's loss, the official title history had originally recognized Cody Rhodes as champion until Rhodes lost the title at WrestleMania 41 the following year. Upon his loss, the official title history was amended, removing Rhodes and instead recognizing Reigns as the final champion, with the title retired the night he lost it at WrestleMania XL.

=== Inaugural championship holders ===
The following list shows the inaugural holders for each world championship created and/or promoted by WWE.

Championship	Holder(s)	Date	Notes
WWE Championship	Buddy Rogers	April 25, 1963	Won the title as the WWWF World Heavyweight Championship which WWE recognizes as happening on April 25, 1963.
WCW World Heavyweight Championship	Ric Flair	January 11, 1991	Flair was the reigning NWA World Heavyweight Champion when World Championship Wrestling began also recognizing him as their world champion. For Flair's 16 world championships, this reign is recognized as one of his 8 NWA reigns.
ECW World Heavyweight Championship	Jimmy Snuka	April 25, 1992	Won the title as the ECW Heavyweight Championship as part of Eastern Championship Wrestling of the National Wrestling Alliance. This is not recognized by WWE.
ECW World Heavyweight Championship	Shane Douglas	March 26, 1994	WWE officially recognizes this as the inaugural reign of the title after Eastern Championship Wrestling split from the NWA to become Extreme Championship Wrestling with Douglas' reign for the latter officially beginning on August 27, 1994.
World Heavyweight Championship (original version)	Triple H	September 2, 2002	
WWE Universal Championship	Finn Bálor	August 21, 2016	
World Heavyweight Championship (current version)	Seth "Freakin" Rollins	May 27, 2023	

== Superlative reigns ==
- (+) – indicates the reign is ongoing.

=== Most total reigns ===
The following list shows the wrestlers who have the most world championship reigns in total, combining all titles they have held as recognized by WWE. This list also shows the titles that they won to achieve this record (minimum five world championship reigns).

No.	Champion	Titles	No. of Reigns	Notes
1	John Cena	WWE Championship (14 times); World Heavyweight Championship (original version, 3 times)	17	During his 12th reign as WWE Champion, the title was known as the WWE World Heavyweight Championship. During his 14th reign, it was known as the Undisputed WWE Championship.
2	Ric Flair	NWA World Heavyweight Championship (8 times); WCW World Heavyweight Championship (6 times); WWE Championship (2 times)	16	During his two reigns as WWE Champion, the title was known as the WWF World Heavyweight Championship. WWE officially recognizes that Flair is a 16-time world champion, with other promotions also recognizing this number. His actual number of world championships exceeds that. Depending on recognition, Flair is variously recognized as a 16-time world champion (8 NWA, 6 WCW, and 2 WWF), 18-time world champion (8 NWA, 8 WCW, and 2 WWF), and 20-time world champion (8 NWA, 8 WCW, 2 WWF, and 2 WCW International), with the number of his WCW titles between 6 and 8. In WCW, Flair was recognized as an eight-time champion but WWE only recognizes 6, counting his first reign as one of his 8 NWA title reigns and ignoring a title vacancy that occurred in 1994 and instead viewing that as one continuous reign. WWE also does not recognize his two WCW International World Championship reigns, recognizing the first reign as an NWA title reign, and not counting the second, which he won via a title unification match.
3	Triple H	WWE Championship (9 times); World Heavyweight Championship (original version, 5 times)	14	During his first four reigns as WWE Champion, the title was known as the WWF Championship. During his fifth reign, the title was known as the Undisputed WWF Championship. During his ninth reign, the title was known as the WWE World Heavyweight Championship. Triple H was the inaugural World Heavyweight Champion, which subsequently made him the first wrestler to hold the World Heavyweight Championship and the WWE Championship.
3	Randy Orton	WWE Championship (10 times); World Heavyweight Championship (original version, 4 times)	14	Orton was the youngest holder of the World Heavyweight Championship at 24, which also makes him the youngest world champion in WWE history. Orton is also the final holder of the title when he unified the World Heavyweight Championship and the WWE Championship to become the WWE World Heavyweight Championship; this occurred during Orton's eighth reign as WWE Champion. By the time of his ninth reign, the title reverted to being called the WWE Championship.
5	Hulk Hogan	WCW World Heavyweight Championship (6 times); WWE Championship (6 times)	12	During his first five reigns as WWE Champion, the title was known as the WWF World Heavyweight Championship, although often abbreviated to WWF Championship. During his sixth reign, the title had three names, and he won it as the Undisputed WWF Championship but was shortly after renamed to Undisputed WWE Championship (due to the company being renamed from WWF to WWE) before being renamed again to WWE Undisputed Championship. Hogan is a 13-time world champion, but WWE does not recognize his reign with the original version of New Japan Pro-Wrestling's IWGP Heavyweight Championship.
6	Edge	World Heavyweight Championship (original version, 7 times); WWE Championship (4 times)	11	
7	Brock Lesnar	WWE Championship (7 times); WWE Universal Championship (3 times)	10	Lesnar first won the WWE Championship when it was called the WWE Undisputed Championship; during that same reign, it was renamed to WWE Championship. During his fourth reign, it was known as the WWE World Heavyweight Championship. Lesnar holds the record for being the youngest wrestler to hold the WWE Championship at 25. With the WWE Universal Championship, Lesnar holds the record for most reigns, and he was also the first wrestler to hold the WWE Championship and the WWE Universal Championship. Lesnar is an 11-time World Champion, but WWE does not recognize his IWGP Heavyweight Championship reign.
7	The Rock	WWE Championship (8 times); WCW World Heavyweight Championship (2 times)	10	During his first six reigns as WWE Champion, the title was known as the WWF Championship. During his seventh reign, it was known as the WWE Undisputed Championship. During his first reign as WCW World Heavyweight Champion, the title was known as the WCW Championship. During his second reign, it was known simply as the World Championship.
9	Sting	NWA World Heavyweight Championship (1 time); WCW World Heavyweight Championship (6 times); WCW International World Heavyweight Championship (2 times)	9	Sting is a 15-time world champion, but WWE does not recognize his one WWA World Heavyweight Championship reign, his one NWA World Heavyweight title in TNA or his four TNA World Heavyweight Championship reigns.
10	Harley Race	NWA World Heavyweight Championship (8 times)	8	
10	CM Punk	World Heavyweight Championship (original version, 3 times); World Heavyweight Championship (current version, 2 times); WWE Championship (3 times, current)	8	During his third reign as WWE Champion, it was known as the Undisputed WWE Championship. Punk is the only wrestler to hold both original and current versions of the World Heavyweight Championship. Punk is a 12-time world champion, but WWE does not recognize his one ECW Championship won during his time with WWE, one ROH World Championship reign and two AEW World Championship reigns.
12	Bret Hart	WCW World Heavyweight Championship (2 times); WWE Championship (5 times)	7	During his five reigns as WWE Champion, the title was known as the WWF World Heavyweight Championship.
12	The Undertaker	World Heavyweight Championship (original version, 3 times); WWE Championship (4 times)	7	During his first two reigns as WWE Champion, the title was known as the WWF World Heavyweight Championship. During his third reign, it was known as the WWF Championship. During his fourth reign, it was known as the WWE Undisputed Championship.
12	Big Show	ECW World Heavyweight Championship (1 time); WCW World Heavyweight Championship (2 times); World Heavyweight Championship (original version, 2 times); WWE Championship (2 times)	7	During his first reign as WWE Champion, the title was known as the WWF Championship. During his reign as ECW World Heavyweight Champion, the title was known as the ECW World Championship. Big Show is the only wrestler to have held all of these championships.
12	Roman Reigns	WWE Championship (4 times); WWE Universal Championship (2 times); World Heavyweight Championship (current version, 1 time)	7	During his first three reigns as WWE Champion, the title was known as the WWE World Heavyweight Championship. Reigns is the only wrestler to hold both titles together as the Undisputed WWE Universal Championship.
16	Kurt Angle	WCW World Heavyweight Championship (1 time); World Heavyweight Championship (original version, 1 time); WWE Championship (4 times)	6	During his first two reigns as WWE Champion, the title was known as the WWF Championship. During his sole reign as WCW World Heavyweight Champion, the title was known as the WCW Championship. Angle is a 13-time world champion, but WWE does not recognize his one IWGP Heavyweight Championship (Inoki Genome Federation version) reign and his six TNA World Heavyweight Championship reigns.
16	Randy Savage	WCW World Heavyweight Championship (4 times); WWE Championship (2 times)	6	During his two reigns as WWE Champion, the title was known as the WWF World Heavyweight Championship. Savage is a 10-time world champion, but WWE does not recognize one USWA Unified World Heavyweight Championship reign and his 3 ICW World Heavyweight Championship reigns
16	"Stone Cold" Steve Austin	WWE Championship (6 times)	6	During all six of his reigns, the title was known as the WWF Championship.
16	Booker T	WCW World Heavyweight Championship (5 times); World Heavyweight Championship (original version, 1 time)	6	In his fourth reign, the WCW World Heavyweight Championship was renamed as the WCW Championship after WWF purchased WCW in 2001. Booker T won his fifth WCW World Heavyweight Championship as the WCW Championship.
16	Chris Jericho	WCW World Heavyweight Championship (2 times); World Heavyweight Championship (original version, 3 times); WWE Championship (1 time)	6	During his first reign as WCW World Heavyweight Champion, the title was known as the WCW Championship. During his second reign, it was known simply as the World Championship. Jericho was also the final holder of the WCW title as he unified it with the then-WWF Championship to become the Undisputed WWF Champion (his only reign of what is now the WWE Championship). Jericho is an 9-time world champion, but WWE does not recognize his one AEW World Championship reign and two ROH World Championship reigns.
16	Batista	World Heavyweight Championship (original version, 4 times); WWE Championship (2 times)	6	
16	Kevin Nash	WCW World Heavyweight Championship (5 times); WWE Championship (1 time)	6	During his reign as WWE Champion, the title was known as the WWF World Heavyweight Championship.
16	Seth Rollins	WWE Championship (2 times); WWE Universal Championship (2 times); World Heavyweight Championship (current version, 2 times)	6	Rollins won the WWE Championship as the WWE World Heavyweight Championship in both of his reigns. Rollins was the inaugural World Heavyweight Champion (current version). Rollins is a 7-time world champion, but WWE does not recognize his ROH World Championship reign.
24
24	Daniel Bryan	World Heavyweight Championship (original version, 1 time); WWE Championship (4 times)	5	During his third reign as WWE Champion, the title was known as the WWE World Heavyweight Championship. Bryan is a 10-time world champion, but WWE does not recognize his one ROH World Championship reign, one AEW World Championship reign, his two PWG World Championship reigns, or his one wXw World Heavyweight Championship reign
24	The Sandman	ECW World Heavyweight Championship (5 times)	5	Despite WWE not recognizing any ECW Championship reigns before 1994, Sandman is described as a 5-time ECW Champion.

=== One-year reigns ===
The following list shows recognized world championship reigns that lasted a calendar year or longer in WWE history.

No.	Champion	Title	Reign	Length (days)	Notes
1	Bruno Sammartino	WWE Championship	1	2,803	During this reign, the title was known as the WWWF World Heavyweight Championship.
2	Hulk Hogan	WWE Championship	1	1,474	During this reign, the title was known as the WWF World Heavyweight Championship.
3	Bob Backlund	WWE Championship	1^{(2)}	1,470	Backlund first won the title as the WWWF Heavyweight Championship. During this reign, it was renamed to WWF Heavyweight Championship when the WWWF was renamed to WWF. WWE recognizes this reign as lasting 2,135 days as they do not recognize Antonio Inoki's reign or the subsequent vacancies of the title that followed, and thus recognize this period as one continuous reign for Backlund. This is the second part of this reign.
4	Roman Reigns	WWE Universal Championship	2	1,316	From April 2022 until April 2024, he held and defended the title together with the WWE Championship as the Undisputed WWE Universal Championship, although both titles retained their individual lineages.
5	Bruno Sammartino	WWE Championship	2	1,237	During this reign, the title was known as the WWWF Heavyweight Championship.
6	Pedro Morales	WWE Championship	1	1,027	During this reign, the title was known as the WWWF Heavyweight Championship.
7	Roman Reigns	WWE Championship	4	735	During this reign, the title was jointly held and defended with the WWE Universal Championship as the Undisputed WWE Universal Championship, although both titles retained their individual lineages.
8	Bob Backlund	WWE Championship	1^{(1)}	648	Backlund first won the title as the WWWF Heavyweight Championship. During this reign, it was renamed to WWF Heavyweight Championship when the WWWF was renamed to WWF. WWE recognizes this reign as lasting 2,135 days as they do not recognize Antonio Inoki's reign or the subsequent vacancies of the title that followed, and thus recognize this period as one continuous reign for Backlund. This is the first part of this reign.
9	Brock Lesnar	WWE Universal Championship	1	504	WWE recognizes this reign as lasting 503 days.
10	Hulk Hogan	WCW World Heavyweight Championship	1	469	
11	CM Punk	WWE Championship	2	434	WWE recognizes this reign as lasting 434 days.
12	Shane Douglas	ECW World Heavyweight Championship	4	406	
13	John Cena	WWE Championship	3	380	WWE recognizes this reign as lasting 380 days. This was the first WWE world title reign to last a calendar year or longer in the 21st Century and the first since Randy Savage's reign from WrestleMania IV to WrestleMania V.
14	Cody Rhodes	WWE Championship	1	378	WWE recognizes this reign as lasting 378 days. During this reign, the title was known as the Undisputed WWE Championship. WWE originally recognized Rhodes' reign as WWE Universal Champion as well during this time, but on Night 2 of WrestleMania 41 WWE retroactively retired the Universal Championship after Rhodes' victory over Reigns on Night 2 of WrestleMania 40.
15	Randy Savage	WWE Championship	1	371	WWE recognizes both reigns as lasting 371 days. During Savage's reign, the title was known as the WWF World Heavyweight Championship while during Styles' reign it was known as the WWE Championship.
15	AJ Styles	WWE Championship	2	371	WWE recognizes both reigns as lasting 371 days. During Savage's reign, the title was known as the WWF World Heavyweight Championship while during Styles' reign it was known as the WWE Championship.

=== Longest per championship ===
The following list shows the longest reigning champion for each world championship created and/or promoted by WWE.

No.	Champion	Title	Reign	Dates held	Length (days)	Notes
1	Bruno Sammartino	WWE Championship	1	May 17, 1963 – January 18, 1971	2,803	During this reign, the title was known as the WWWF World Heavyweight Championship.
2	Roman Reigns	WWE Universal Championship	2	August 30, 2020 – April 7, 2024	1,316	From April 2022 until April 2024, he held and defended the title together with the WWE Championship as the Undisputed WWE Universal Championship, although both titles retained their individual lineages.
3	Hulk Hogan	WCW World Heavyweight Championship	1	July 17, 1994 – October 29, 1995	469	
4	Shane Douglas	ECW World Heavyweight Championship	4	November 30, 1997 – January 10, 1999	406	
5	Seth "Freakin" Rollins	World Heavyweight Championship (current version)	1	May 27, 2023 – April 7, 2024	316	
6	Batista	World Heavyweight Championship (original version)	1	April 3, 2005 – January 10, 2006	282	

=== Most per championship ===
The following list shows the wrestlers with the most reigns for each world championship created and/or promoted by WWE.

No.	Champion	Title	No. of reigns	Notes
1	John Cena	WWE Championship	14	During Cena's 12th reign, the title was known as the WWE World Heavyweight Championship and during his 14th reign, the title was known as the Undisputed WWE Championship.
2	Edge	World Heavyweight Championship (original version)	7	
3	Ric Flair	WCW World Heavyweight Championship	6	In World Championship Wrestling (WCW), Flair was recognized as an 8-time champion, but WWE only recognizes 6, counting his first reign as one of his 8 NWA World Heavyweight Championship reigns and ignoring a title vacancy that occurred in 1994 and instead viewing that as one continuous reign.
3	Hulk Hogan	WCW World Heavyweight Championship	6	In World Championship Wrestling (WCW), Flair was recognized as an 8-time champion, but WWE only recognizes 6, counting his first reign as one of his 8 NWA World Heavyweight Championship reigns and ignoring a title vacancy that occurred in 1994 and instead viewing that as one continuous reign.
3	Sting	WCW World Heavyweight Championship	6	In World Championship Wrestling (WCW), Flair was recognized as an 8-time champion, but WWE only recognizes 6, counting his first reign as one of his 8 NWA World Heavyweight Championship reigns and ignoring a title vacancy that occurred in 1994 and instead viewing that as one continuous reign.
4	The Sandman	ECW World Heavyweight Championship	5	
5	Brock Lesnar	WWE Universal Championship	3	
6	Gunther	World Heavyweight Championship (current version)	2	
6	Seth Rollins	World Heavyweight Championship (current version)	2	
6	CM Punk	World Heavyweight Championship (current version)	2	

== See also ==
- Tag team championships in WWE
- Women's championships in WWE
