= World Heavyweight Championship (WWE) =

Men's professional wrestling championship

- The World Heavyweight Championship belt with default side plates

Details
- Promotion: WWE
- Brand: Raw
- Date established: April 24, 2023
- Current champion: Roman Reigns
- Date won: April 19, 2026
Statistics
- First champion: Seth Rollins
- Most reigns: 2 reigns: Gunther; Seth Rollins; CM Punk
- Longest reign: Seth Rollins (1st reign, 316 days)
- Shortest reign: CM Punk (1st reign, 5 minutes and 10 seconds)
- Oldest champion: CM Punk (47 years, 6 days)
- Youngest champion: Gunther (36 years, 349 days)
- Heaviest champion: Drew McIntyre (275 lb (125 kg))
- Lightest champion: CM Punk (218 lb (99 kg))

The World Heavyweight Championship is a men's professional wrestling world heavyweight championship created and promoted by the American promotion WWE, defended on the Raw brand division. It is one of two men's world titles on WWE's main roster, along with the Undisputed WWE Championship on SmackDown. The current champion is Roman Reigns, who is in his first reign. He won the title by defeating previous champion CM Punk at WrestleMania 42 Night 2 on April 19, 2026.

Established on April 24, 2023, the title's creation came as a result of Roman Reigns, who at the time jointly held both the WWE Championship and the now-defunct WWE Universal Championship as the Undisputed WWE Universal Championship. With the announcement of the 2023 WWE Draft, the World Heavyweight Championship was unveiled on Monday Night Raw and subsequently became exclusive to Raw after Reigns and the Undisputed WWE Universal Championship became exclusive to SmackDown. The inaugural World Heavyweight Champion was Seth Rollins.

The title is distinct from WWE's previous World Heavyweight Championship that was contested from 2002 until 2013 when it was unified into the WWE Championship. Although the two titles share the same name and the design pays homage to the original Big Gold Belt, they do not have a direct lineage. It is the fourth men's world championship to be created by WWE, after the WWE Championship (1963–present), the previous World Heavyweight Championship (2002–2013), and the Universal Championship (2016–2024), and the sixth overall men's world title used by the company, including the WCW Championship (2001) and the ECW Championship (2006–2010).

== History ==
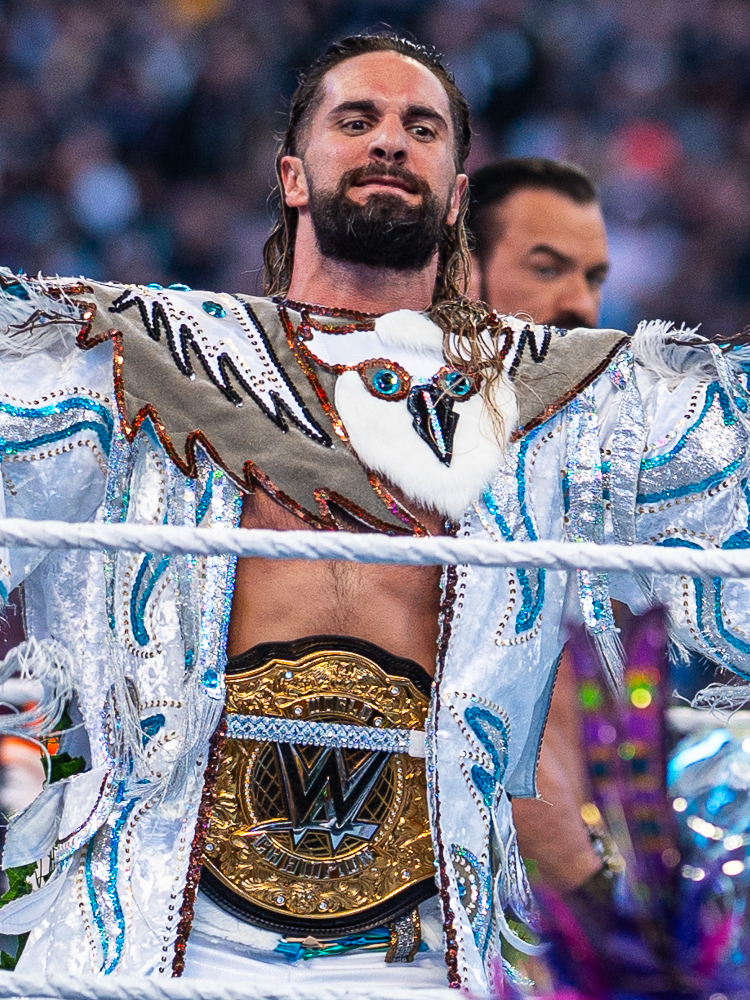
Inaugural and record-tying two-time champion Seth Rollins, whose first reign is also the longest for the title at 316 days.

On the April 24, 2023, episode of WWE's flagship professional wrestling television program, Monday Night Raw, WWE Chief Content Officer Paul "Triple H" Levesque announced the 2023 WWE Draft, a process to assign performers to a division as part of the WWE brand extension. He then addressed Roman Reigns and the Undisputed WWE Universal Championship. Since WrestleMania 38 in April 2022, Reigns had held and defended the promotion's two world championships, the WWE Championship and now-defunct WWE Universal Championship, as the Undisputed WWE Universal Championship across both the Raw and SmackDown brands; however, due to the terms of his contract, Reigns made infrequent title defenses. Triple H decided that Reigns and his undisputed championship would become exclusive to one brand and unveiled a new World Heavyweight Championship to be defended on the other brand. It was also revealed that the inaugural champion would be crowned at Night of Champions on May 27, 2023. During Night 1 of the draft on the April 28 episode of Friday Night SmackDown, Reigns was drafted to SmackDown, subsequently making the World Heavyweight Championship exclusive to Raw.

During the Backlash press conference on May 5, 2023, Triple H announced a tournament for the title including wrestlers from both brands with a bracket for each brand. The first round and semifinals for each bracket were scheduled for the May 8 and 12 episodes of Raw and SmackDown, respectively. The first-round matches for each episode consisted of two triple threat matches with the respective winners advancing to the semifinals in a singles match the same night, with those respective winners advancing to the championship match at Night of Champions. According to wrestling journalist Dave Meltzer, the reason that SmackDown wrestlers were included in the tournament was due to WWE's attempt to retain viewership for the May 12 episode of SmackDown, as it and other wrestling programs that week were going head-to-head with the 2023 NBA playoffs.

The participants for the World Heavyweight Championship tournament were revealed on May 7 on WWE's YouTube channel: Seth Rollins, Cody Rhodes, Damian Priest, Finn Bálor, Shinsuke Nakamura, and The Miz from Raw, and AJ Styles, Austin Theory, Bobby Lashley, Edge, Rey Mysterio, and Sheamus from SmackDown. On the May 8 episode of Raw, Rollins defeated Nakamura and Priest in the first triple threat while Bálor defeated Miz and Rhodes in the second. Rollins subsequently defeated Bálor in the semifinals to win Raw's bracket. On the May 12 episode of SmackDown, Styles defeated Edge and Mysterio in the first triple threat while Lashley defeated Sheamus and Theory in the second. Styles subsequently defeated Lashley in the semifinals to win SmackDown's bracket, thus setting up the tournament final between Rollins and Styles.

At Night of Champions, Rollins defeated Styles to become the inaugural World Heavyweight Champion. The title was defended for the first time on the June 5 episode of Raw. On August 2, 2025, in the main event of Night 1 of SummerSlam, CM Punk defeated Gunther to win the World Heavyweight Championship. In the process, Punk became the first wrestler to have won both the new and previous versions of WWE's World Heavyweight Championship.

== Tournaments ==
=== Inaugural tournament ===
First Round; Raw; May 8, 2023; SmackDown; May 12, 2023
Damian Priest Shinsuke Nakamura	— 13:25
Seth Rollins	Pinfall
Raw
Cody Rhodes The Miz	— 9:30
Finn Bálor	Pinfall
Edge Rey Mysterio	16:00 —
AJ Styles	Pinfall
SmackDown
Bobby Lashley	Pinfall
Austin Theory Sheamus	13:00 —

Semifinals; Raw; May 8, 2023; SmackDown; May 12, 2023
Seth Rollins	Pinfall
Finn Bálor	13:30
AJ Styles	Pinfall
Bobby Lashley	12:00

Final; Night of Champions; May 27, 2023
Seth Rollins	Pinfall
AJ Styles	20:40

=== World Heavyweight Championship No. 1 Contender's Tournament (2026) ===
First round Raw; August 10–17, 2026; Lucha Libre AAA; August 15, 2026
Raw	Penta	Pinfall
AAA	Laredo Kid	10:40
AAA	Psycho Clown	9:06
AAA	La Parka	Pinfall
Raw	Dragon Lee	Pinfall
AAA	El Hijo de Dr. Wagner Jr.	11:05
SmackDown	Rey Fénix	Pinfall
AAA	El Fiscal	9:05

Semifinals; Raw; August 24, 2026
Raw	Penta	Pinfall
AAA	La Parka	8:55
Raw	Dragon Lee	13:40
SmackDown	Rey Fénix	Pinfall

Final; Raw; August 28, 2026 (aired: August 31)
Raw	Penta	Pinfall
SmackDown	Rey Fénix	19:10

== Belt design ==
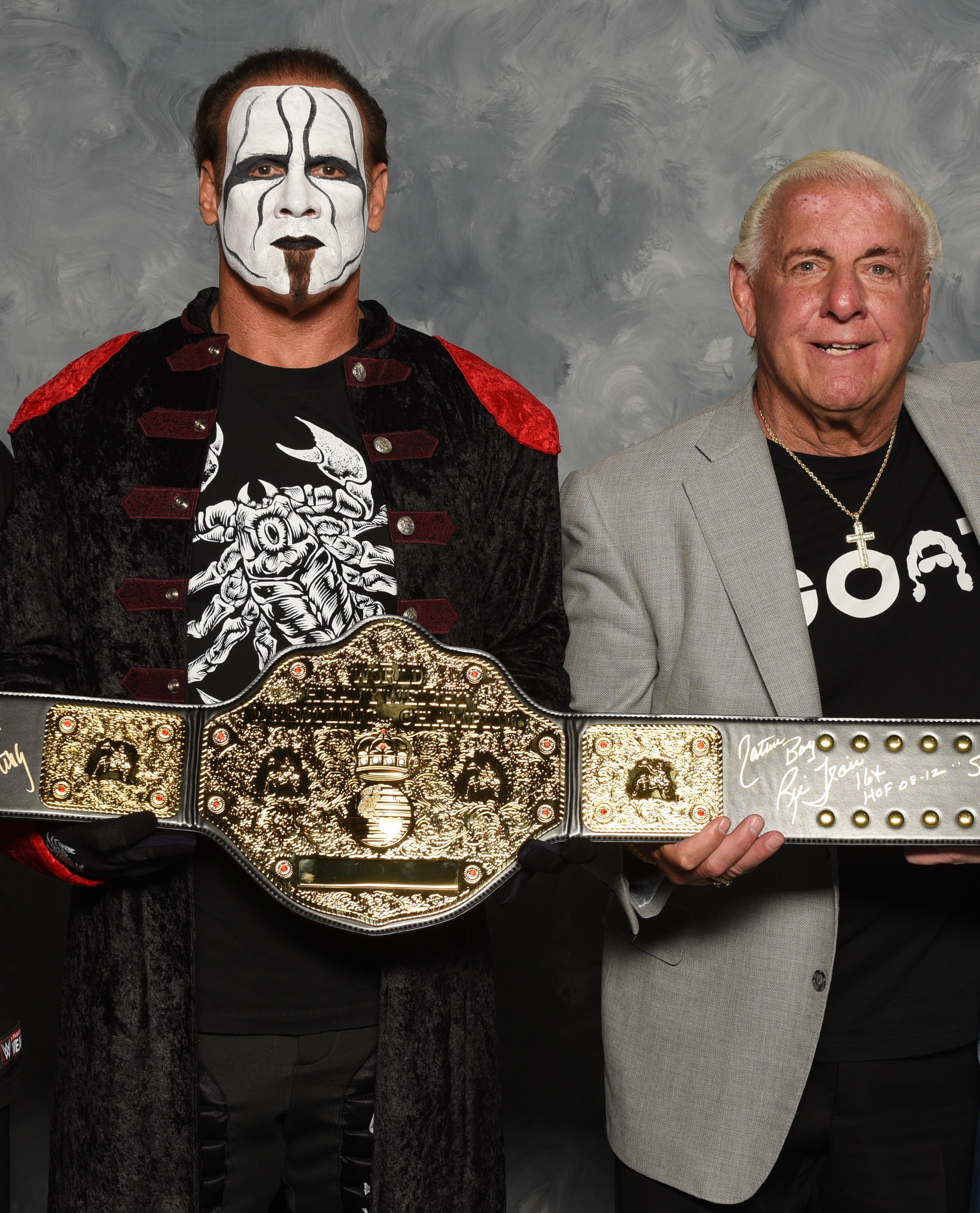
Sting and Ric Flair with the original Big Gold Belt

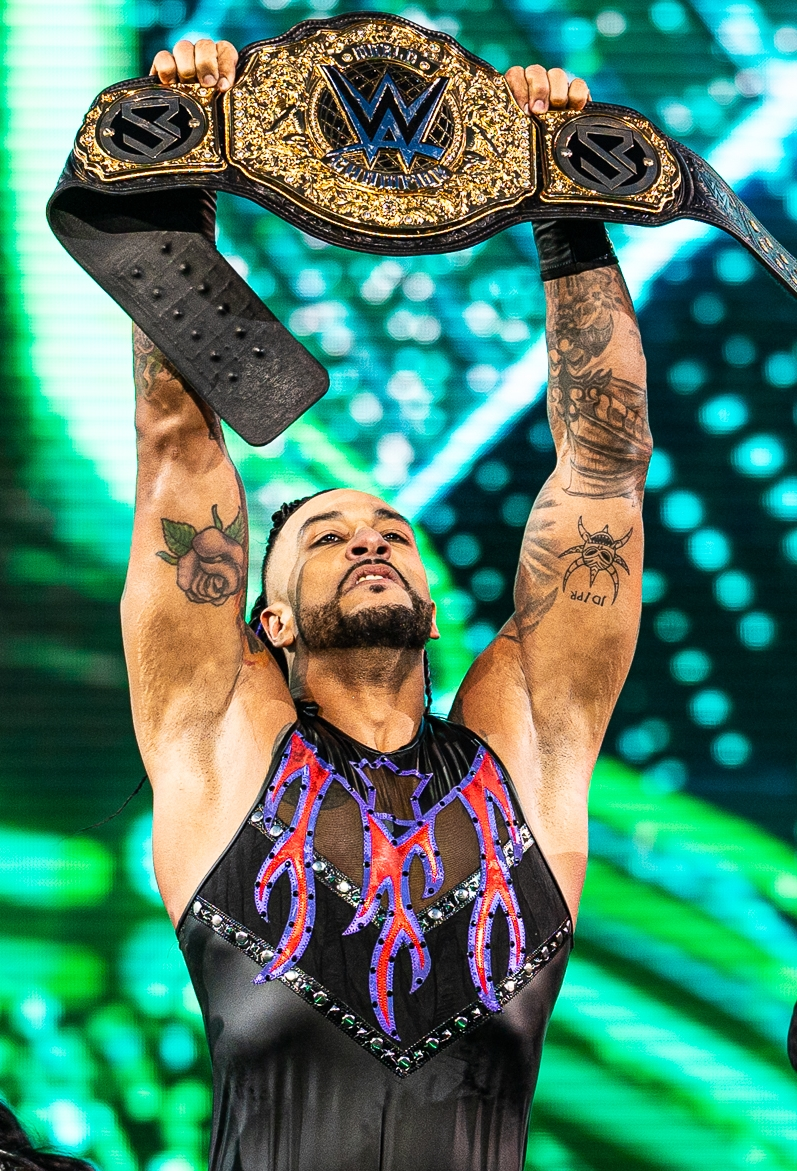
Damian Priest with the World Heavyweight Championship—designed in homage to the Big Gold Belt

The World Heavyweight Championship title belt has a design that pays homage to the historic Big Gold Belt, which was used for WWE's previous World Heavyweight Championship (2002–2013), as well as the NWA World Heavyweight Championship and WCW World Heavyweight Championship 1986 to 1991 and 1991 to 2001 versions before that. It also features tributes to previous designs of the company's original world championship, the WWE Championship (1963–present). Like the historic Big Gold Belt, the title has three large gold plates on a black leather strap. All three plates include traditional filigree with each plate outlined in a rope trim to represent the three ropes of a wrestling ring. Like all of WWE's championship belts, the side plates include a removable round center section which can be replaced with the reigning champion's logo in lieu of the nameplate that was found on the original Big Gold Belt; the default side plates feature a gold WWE logo over a globe (customizable side plates were introduced with the 2013–2014 version of the WWE Championship belt).

At the center of the center plate, there is a large globe that has WWE's logo over top of it. The WWE logo is silver with black filled in the blank spaces of the globe. The globe itself represents that the title is defended around the world. Above the globe is a banner with the text "WORLD" written in silver with a banner below the globe that says "CHAMPION", also in silver. Also on the center plate are three lions, which represent the McMahon family crest (as WWE was founded and owned by the McMahon family until September 2023); there is a full-bodied lion on each opposing side of the globe facing outwards while the third is a lion's head at the very bottom of the center plate (the McMahon family crest was previously included on the side plates of the WWE Championship belts from 1998 to 2005). At the top of the center plate right above the "WORLD" banner is a crown, a nod to Bruno Sammartino's WWE Championship belt during his long reign (there was also a crown on the Big Gold Belt). Right above the crown is an eagle, which is an homage to the various WWE Championship belts that included an eagle up until 2013, most notably the Winged Eagle championship belt design (1988–1998). There are a total of 60 diamonds across the three plates; these were in commemoration of the 60th anniversary of WWE, as the company was founded in April 1963 and the title was unveiled in April 2023.

== Reception ==
The creation of the World Heavyweight Championship was met with mixed reception. Some liked the idea of the title, feeling that it would give new opportunities for several wrestlers, while others were critical. A segment of the fanbase were disappointed that it did not continue the titleholder lineage from the previous World Heavyweight Championship defended in WWE from 2002 to 2013. Dave Scherer of PWInsider felt that since Roman Reigns was not in the inaugural tournament, it made the World Heavyweight Championship seem like a secondary title to his Undisputed WWE Universal Championship. Former WWE and Extreme Championship Wrestling wrestler Tommy Dreamer opined that the title's creation felt like a consolation prize, stating that it gave the impression that nobody could beat Reigns. Nonetheless, he praised the design of the belt. Conversely, WWE Hall of Fame member Booker T stated that he did not think it felt like a secondary title or consolation prize, agreeing with the sentiment that it would provide new opportunities, especially for younger wrestlers.

WWE commentator Corey Graves said that having the title was great as it would allow Raw and SmackDown to identify as separate brands (as brand division had been lax over the preceding year), but he claimed that until Reigns was defeated, anyone holding the World Heavyweight Championship would feel inferior to Reigns. Scherer also felt that whoever would finally beat Reigns, the impact would be lessened due to the existence of the World Heavyweight Championship. Prior to competing in the tournament final, runner-up AJ Styles said that it was hard to argue that the new title was not secondary compared to Reigns' undisputed championship, a sentiment shared by WWE Hall of Famer Kurt Angle, who nonetheless praised the design of the belt.

== Reigns ==
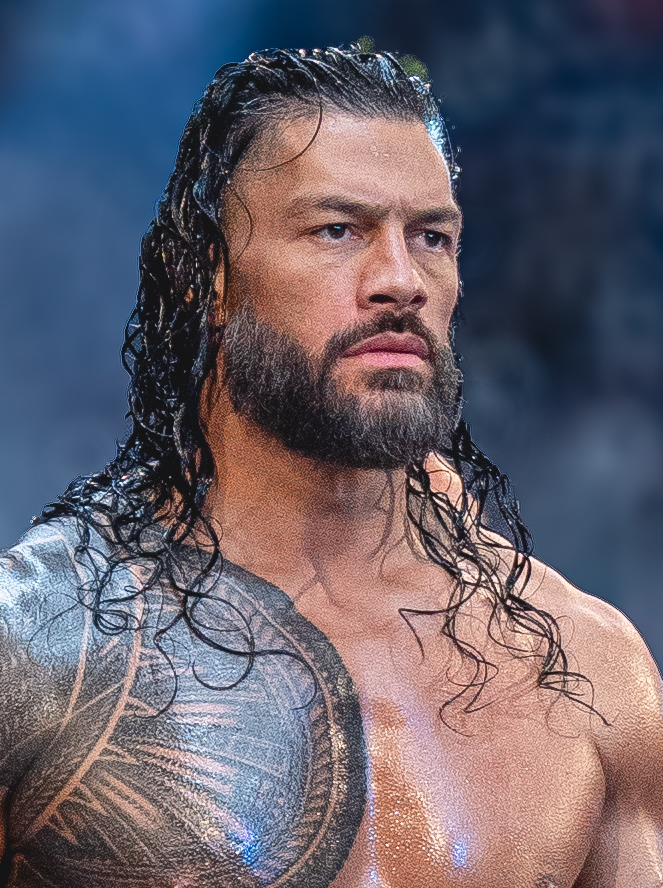
Current champion Roman Reigns

As of October 30, 2026, there have been 10 reigns between seven champions and one vacancy. The inaugural champion was Seth Rollins, whose first reign is the longest at 316 days, while CM Punk's first reign is the shortest at five minutes and ten seconds. Rollins, Gunther, and Punk are tied for the most reigns at two, with Rollins also having the longest combined reign at 395 days (394 as recognized by WWE). Punk is the oldest title holder at 47 years old, while Gunther is the youngest at 36 years, 349 days.

Roman Reigns is the current champion in his first reign. He won the title by defeating previous champion CM Punk at WrestleMania 42 Night 2 on April 19, 2026, in Paradise, Nevada.

Key
No.	Overall reign number
Reign	Reign number for the specific champion
Days	Number of days held
Days recog.	Number of days held recognized by the promotion
<1	Reign lasted less than a day
+	Current reign is changing daily

No.	Champion	Championship change			Reign statistics			Notes	Ref.
No.	Champion	Date	Event	Location	Reign	Days	Days recog.	Notes	Ref.
WWE: Raw
1	Seth Rollins	May 27, 2023	Night of Champions	Jeddah, Saudi Arabia	1	316	316	The title was designated to Raw after the Undisputed WWE Universal Championship became exclusive to SmackDown following the 2023 WWE Draft. Rollins defeated AJ Styles in the tournament final to become the inaugural champion.	
2	Drew McIntyre	April 7, 2024	WrestleMania XL; Night 2	Philadelphia, PA	1	<1	<1		
3	Damian Priest	April 7, 2024	WrestleMania XL; Night 2	Philadelphia, PA	1	118	118	This was Priest's Money in the Bank cash-in match.	
4	Gunther	August 3, 2024	SummerSlam	Cleveland, OH	1	259	258		
5	Jey Uso	April 19, 2025	WrestleMania 41; Night 1	Paradise, NV	1	51	51		
6	Gunther	June 9, 2025	Raw	Phoenix, AZ	2	54	53		
7	CM Punk	August 2, 2025	SummerSlam; Night 1	East Rutherford, NJ	1	<1	<1		
8	Seth Rollins	August 2, 2025	SummerSlam; Night 1	East Rutherford, NJ	2	79	78	This was Rollins's Money in the Bank cash-in match.	
—	Vacated	October 20, 2025	Raw	Sacramento, CA	—	—	—	Seth Rollins was stripped of the title due to a shoulder injury at Crown Jewel on October 11. In kayfabe, he was injured by an attack from Bron Breakker and Bronson Reed on the October 13 episode of Raw.	
9	CM Punk	November 1, 2025	Saturday Night's Main Event XLI	Salt Lake City, UT	2	169	169	Defeated Jey Uso to win the vacant title.	
10	Roman Reigns	April 19, 2026	WrestleMania 42; Night 2	Paradise, NV	1	194+	194+	Reigns was a member of the SmackDown brand and transferred to Raw after winning the title.	

== Combined reigns ==
As of October 30, 2026.

†	Indicates the reigning champion
<1	Reign was less than a day

Rank	Wrestler	No. of reigns	Combined days	Combined days rec. by WWE
1	Seth Rollins	2	395	394
2	Gunther	2	313	311
3	Roman Reigns †	1	194+	
4	CM Punk	2	169	
5	Damian Priest	1	118	
6	Jey Uso	1	51	
7	Drew McIntyre	1	<1	

== Notes ==
Sporting positions
Preceded by World Heavyweight Championship	WWE's top world championship 2023–present	Succeeded by Still active
