= Theory (disambiguation) =

Theory is a type of abstract or generalizing thinking, or its result.

Theory may also refer to:

== Types ==
- Theory (mathematical logic), a set of sentences (theorems) in a formal language
- Chess theory, consensus and literature on how the game should be played
- Conspiracy theory – Attributing events to improbable causes
- Literary theory, the systematic study of the nature of literature, or any of a variety of scholarly approaches to reading texts
- Mathematical theory, an area of mathematical research that is relatively self-contained
- Philosophical theory, a position that explains or accounts for a general philosophy or specific branch of philosophy
- Scientific theory, a well-substantiated explanation of some aspect of the natural world
- Social theory, an analytical framework or paradigm that is used to study and interpret social phenomena

== People ==
- Austin Theory, American professional wrestler
- Ki:Theory, the American recording artist and producer Joel Burleson
- The former stage name of hip hop and smooth jazz artist Dax Reynosa

== Businesses ==
- Theory (clothing retailer), a New York-based fashion label
- Theory Eatery, an American cuisine restaurant in Portland, Oregon

== Other ==
- Theory, a type of argument in policy debate
- "Theory" (poem), a poem from Wallace Stevens's first book of poetry, Harmonium, published in 1917
- Theory of a Deadman, also known as Theory, a rock band
- "Theory", an interlude by Janet Jackson from All for You

== See also ==
- Theorem
- List of notable theories
- Theoria, theological contemplation
- Mathematical theory (disambiguation)
- Thiery (surname)
- Thierry, given name and surname
- Theorema (disambiguation)
- Teorema (disambiguation)
