= Thiéry =

Thiéry may refer to:

- Thiéry, Alpes-Maritimes, commune in France
- Thiéry, Burkina Faso, town in West Africa
- Thiery (surname)

== See also ==
- Thierry, given name and surname
