= A-Town Down Under =

American professional wrestling tag team

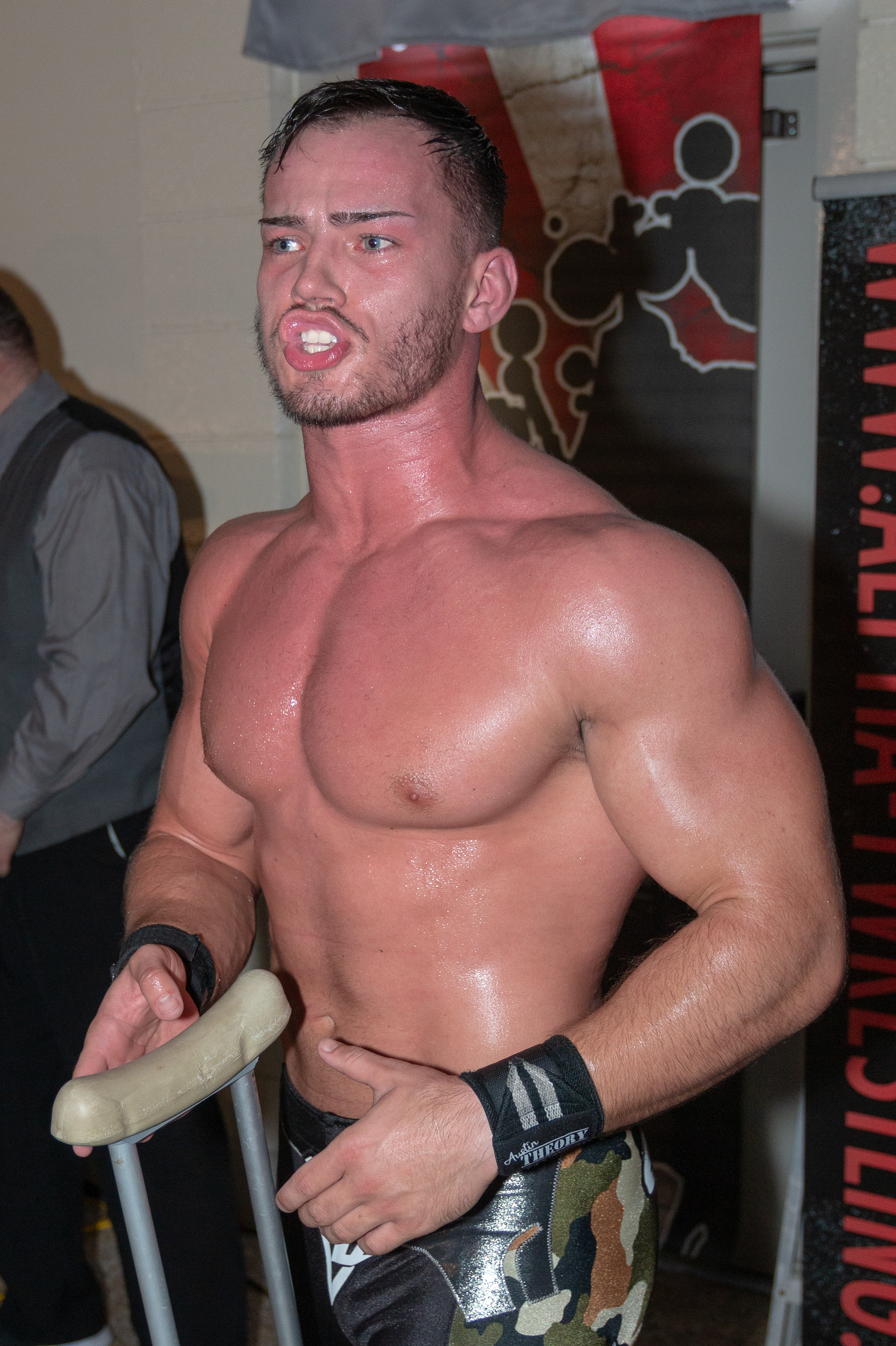
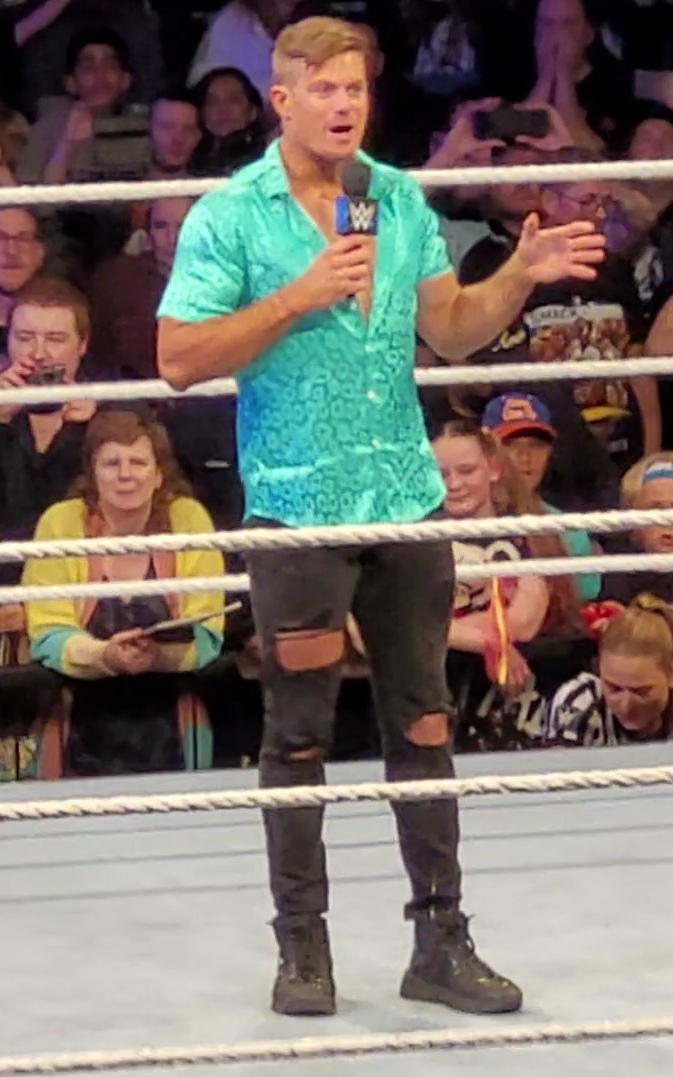
- A-Town Down Under: Grayson Waller (right) and Austin Theory (left).

Tag team
- Members: Austin Theory; Grayson Waller
- Name(s): A-Town Down Under; Austin Theory and Grayson Waller
- Billed heights: Theory: 6 ft 1 in (1.85 m); Waller: 6 ft 3 in (1.91 m)
- Combined billed weight: 424 lb (192 kg); Theory: 220 lb (100 kg); Waller: 204 lb (93 kg)
- Debut: September 1, 2023
- Disbanded: July 21, 2025
- Years active: 2023–2025

A-Town Down Under was a professional wrestling tag team consisting of Austin Theory and Grayson Waller. They were one-time WWE Tag Team Champions.

== History ==
=== Formation and WWE Tag Team Champions (2023–2024) ===
As part of the 2023 WWE Draft, both Waller & Theory were drafted to the SmackDown brand. On the September 22, 2023, episode of SmackDown, Theory and Waller teamed up to defeat The Brawling Brutes (Butch and Ridge Holland) in a match. On the October 13 episode of SmackDown, Theory and Waller challenged Cody Rhodes and Jey Uso for the Undisputed WWE Tag Team Championship in a losing effort. On the November 10 episode of SmackDown, Waller and Theory provoked the newest member of the SmackDown roster, Kevin Owens, resulting in Owens attacking both of them and being kayfabe suspended by the WWE. On the December 15 episode of SmackDown, both Waller and Theory lost in the first rounds of the United States Championship #1 Contender Tournament to Carmelo Hayes and Owens respectively. On the January 12, 2024, episode of SmackDown, Theory faced Hayes, but their match ended in a shoot no-contest after both of them landed on their heads from the top rope. WWE later announced that they only suffered face contusions and Theory proceeded to defeat Hayes in their rematch on the January 26 episode of SmackDown after interference from Waller.

On February 24 at Elimination Chamber: Perth, Theory and Waller co-hosted The Grayson Waller Effect featuring Cody Rhodes and World Heavyweight Champion Seth Rollins. After imitating The Rock, Rhodes and Rollins attacked Theory. The following month, Theory and Waller entered a tag team tournament, defeating The O.C. (Karl Anderson and Luke Gallows) on the March 22 episode of SmackDown and The Street Profits (Angelo Dawkins and Montez Ford) in the finals a week later to qualify for the six-pack ladder match for the Undisputed WWE Tag Team Championship at WrestleMania XL. At Night 1 of WrestleMania XL, Waller retrieved the SmackDown Tag Team Championship for A-Town Down Under to become the new champions, although they failed to win the Raw Tag Team Championship as that was won by The Awesome Truth (R-Truth and The Miz). On the April 19 episode of SmackDown, the SmackDown Tag Team Championship was renamed as the WWE Tag Team Championship and the team was presented with new title belts by WWE chief content officer Paul "Triple H" Levesque and SmackDown general manager Nick Aldis. On the May 3 episode of SmackDown, A-Town Down Under defeated The Street Profits (Angelo Dawkins and Montez Ford) in their first title defense. On the July 5 episode of SmackDown, A-Town Down Under lost the titles to #DIY (Johnny Gargano and Tommaso Ciampa), ending their reign at 90 days. Austin Theory and Grayson Waller also had previously feuded with #DIY weeks before the title loss. They failed to win the titles in a rematch on the following episode of SmackDown, ending their feud. After a promo on twitter A-Town Down Under got a NXT tag title shot Oct 8th.

=== Championship pursuits and disbandment (2024–2025) ===
On the September 6, 2024, episode of SmackDown, A-Town Down Under faced Kevin Owens in a 2-on-1 handicap match but were unsuccessful as Theory was pinned, after the match Waller carried on the attack on Kevin Owens and the two double teamed Owens and then left. On the September 13, 2024, episode of SmackDown, Austin Theory and Grayson Waller faced Kevin Owens and his mystery partner Randy Orton in a tag team match but were unsuccessful.

After a promo on social media the previous week, Theory and Waller returned to NXT on September 24, challenging Fraxiom (Nathan Frazer and Axiom) for the NXT Tag Team Championship, which they accepted. Later that night, they defeated Cedric Alexander and Je'Von Evans following a backstage confrontation. On the October 8 episode of NXT, they failed to win the titles from Fraxiom.

On the January 24 episode of SmackDown, it was announced by SmackDown general manager Nick Aldis that A-Town Down Under would be moving to the Raw brand as part of the transfer window.

On the July 21 episode of Raw, Waller aligned himself with The New Day after it was reported Theory suffered a legitimate injury, quietly disbanding the team. Theory would return and align with The Vision in December of that year.

== Other media ==
Theory and Waller appeared on WWE 2K23, WWE 2K24, and WWE 2K25.

== Championships and accomplishments ==
- Pro Wrestling Illustrated
  - Ranked Theory No. 45 of the top 500 singles wrestlers in the PWI 500 in 2023
  - Ranked Waller No. 261 of the top 500 singles wrestlers in the PWI 500 in 2024
- WWE
  - WWE (SmackDown) Tag Team Championship (Note: Austin Theory and Grayson Waller won the WWE Tag Team Championships as the SmackDown Tag Team Championships. The title was renamed on the April 19, 2024, episode of SmackDown.) (1 time)
