= List of WWE Tag Team Champions =

The WWE Tag Team Championship is a men's professional wrestling world tag team championship contested in WWE on the SmackDown brand. Unveiled on the August 30, 2016, episode of SmackDown as the SmackDown Tag Team Championship, it was created to be the counterpart title to the then-WWE Tag Team Championship, which became exclusive to Raw as a result of the 2016 WWE draft and was subsequently renamed to Raw Tag Team Championship. Beginning in May 2022, the Raw and SmackDown titles were held and defended together as the Undisputed WWE Tag Team Championship until they were split at WrestleMania XL in April 2024. After their split, the Raw title was renamed as World Tag Team Championship while the SmackDown title became the WWE Tag Team Championship.

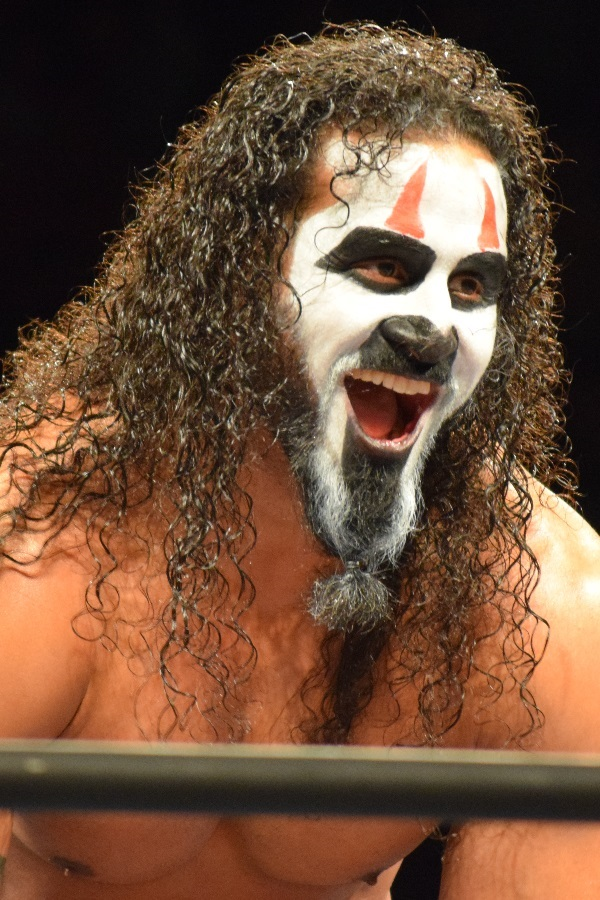
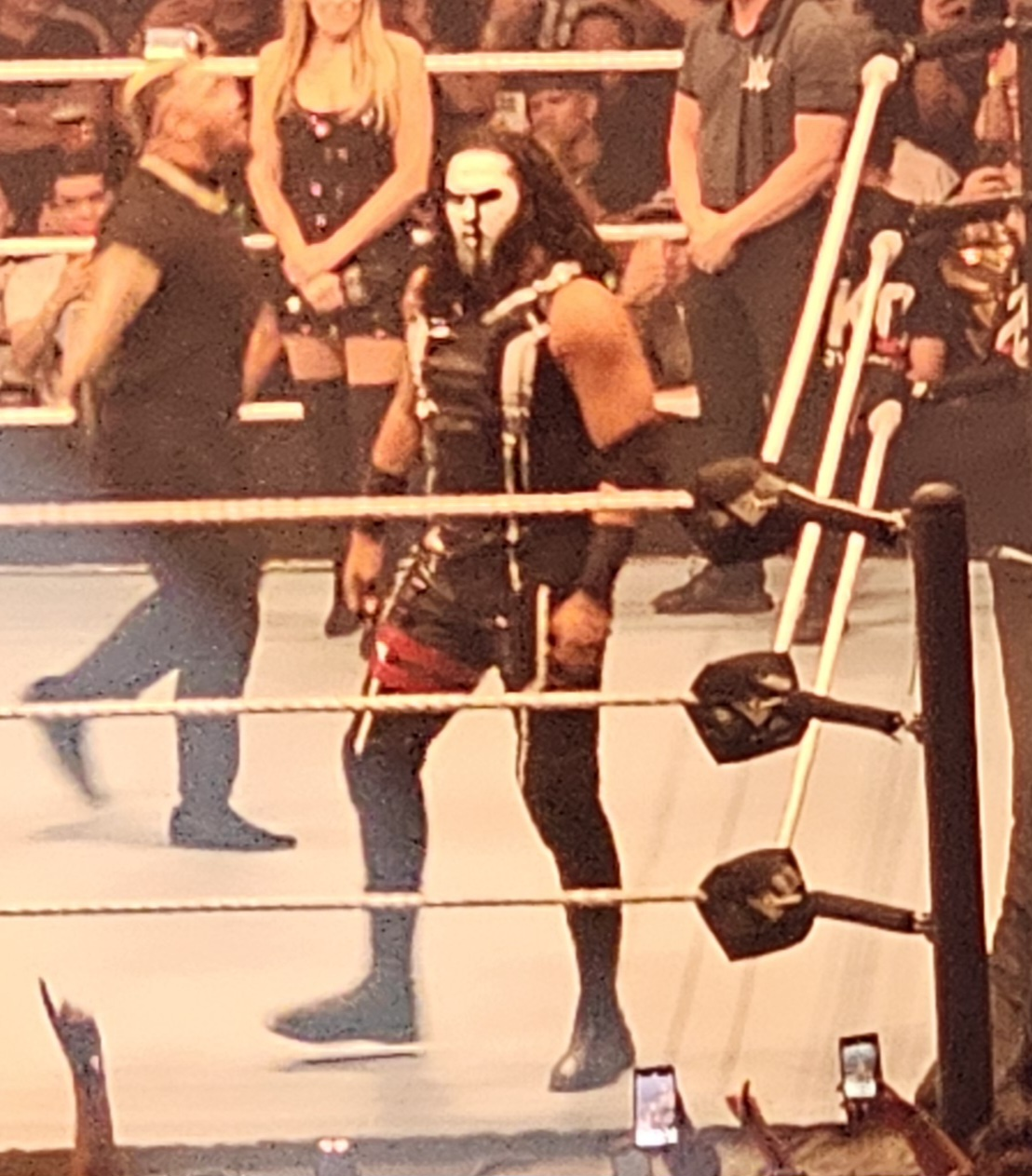
Current champions The MFTs (Tama Tonga and Talla Tonga)

The championship is generally contested in professional wrestling matches, in which participants execute scripted finishes rather than contend in direct competition. The inaugural champions were Heath Slater and Rhyno, who won the title in a tournament final at Backlash on September 11, 2016. The MFTs (Tama Tonga and Talla Tonga) are the current champions in their first reign as a team, while individually, it is Tama's third reign and Talla's first. They won the title by defeating previous champions Damian Priest and R-Truth and The War Raiders (Erik and Ivar) in a triple threat tag team match on the August 14, 2026, episode of SmackDown in Boston, Massachusetts.

As of November 22, 2026, overall there have been 40 reigns between 26 teams composed of 49 individual champions, and one vacancy. The New Day's Kofi Kingston and Xavier Woods have the most reigns at seven, both as a team and individually, and their seventh is the shortest reign for the title at 3 days (2 days as recognized by WWE); during their first six reigns, Big E was also recognized as champion under the Freebird Rule. The Usos (Jey Uso and Jimmy Uso) have the longest singular reign at 622 days for their fifth reign, and they have the longest combined reign as a team at 1,002 days, while individually, Jey has the longest combined reign at 1,011 days (1,010 days as recognized by WWE). The oldest champion is R-Truth, winning the title at 54 years old, while the youngest is Dominik Mysterio when he won it at 24.

== Title history ==
| Name | Years |
|---|---|
| WWE SmackDown Tag Team Championship | August 30, 2016 – April 19, 2024 |
| Undisputed WWE Tag Team Championship (Note: In tandem with the then-WWE Raw Tag Team Championship.) | May 20, 2022 – April 6, 2024 |
| WWE Tag Team Championship | April 19, 2024 – present |

=== Reigns ===
Key
| No. | Overall reign number |
| Reign | Reign number for the specific team—reign numbers for the individuals are in parentheses, if different |
| Days | Number of days held |
| Days recog. | Number of days held recognized by the promotion |
| + | Current reign is changing daily |

| No. | Champion | Championship change | | | Reign statistics | | | Notes | Ref. |
| No. | Champion | Date | Event | Location | Reign | Days | Days recog. | Notes | Ref. |
|---|---|---|---|---|---|---|---|---|---|
WWE: SmackDown
| 1 | Heath Slater and Rhyno | September 11, 2016 | Backlash | Richmond, VA | 1 | 84 | 83 | As a result of the reintroduction of the brand split and the 2016 WWE draft, the WWE Tag Team Championship became exclusive to Raw. In response, SmackDown established the SmackDown Tag Team Championship; Raw's title was subsequently renamed. Slater and Rhyno defeated The Usos (Jey Uso and Jimmy Uso) in the finals of an eight-team tournament to become the inaugural champions. | |
| 2 | The Wyatt Family (Bray Wyatt, Luke Harper, and Randy Orton) | December 4, 2016 | TLC: Tables, Ladders & Chairs | Dallas, TX | 1 | 23 | 23 | Wyatt and Orton won the match, but Harper was also recognized as champion under the Freebird Rule. | |
| 3 | American Alpha (Chad Gable and Jason Jordan) | December 27, 2016 | SmackDown | Rosemont, IL | 1 | 84 | 83 | This was a fatal four-way tag team elimination match, also involving Heath Slater and Rhyno and The Usos (Jey Uso and Jimmy Uso). Luke Harper and Randy Orton represented The Wyatt Family and were last to be pinned. | |
| 4 | The Usos (Jey Uso and Jimmy Uso) | March 21, 2017 | SmackDown | Uncasville, CT | 1 | 124 | 123 | | |
| 5 | The New Day (Big E, Kofi Kingston, and Xavier Woods) | July 23, 2017 | Battleground | Philadelphia, PA | 1 | 28 | 27 | Kingston and Woods won the match, but Big E was also recognized as champion under the Freebird Rule. | |
| 6 | The Usos (Jey Uso and Jimmy Uso) | August 20, 2017 | SummerSlam; Kickoff | Brooklyn, NY | 2 | 23 | 23 | Big E and Xavier Woods represented The New Day. | |
| 7 | The New Day (Big E, Kofi Kingston, and Xavier Woods) | September 12, 2017 | SmackDown | Las Vegas, NV | 2 | 26 | 25 | This was a Sin City Street Fight. Big E and Kingston won the match, but Woods was also recognized as champion under the Freebird Rule. | |
| 8 | The Usos (Jey Uso and Jimmy Uso) | October 8, 2017 | Hell in a Cell | Detroit, MI | 3 | 182 | 182 | This was a Hell in a Cell match. Big E and Xavier Woods represented The New Day. | |
| 9 | The Bludgeon Brothers (Harper and Rowan) | April 8, 2018 | WrestleMania 34 | New Orleans, LA | 1 (2, 1) | 135 | 135 | This was a triple threat tag team match, also involving The New Day's Big E and Kofi Kingston who the Bludgeons pinned. Harper was previously known as Luke Harper. | |
| 10 | The New Day (Big E, Kofi Kingston, and Xavier Woods) | August 21, 2018 | SmackDown | Brooklyn, NY | 3 | 56 | 55 | This was a No Disqualification match. Kingston and Woods won the match, but Big E was also recognized as champion under the Freebird Rule. | |
| 11 | The Bar (Cesaro and Sheamus) | October 16, 2018 | SmackDown 1000 | Washington, D.C. | 1 | 103 | 102 | Big E and Xavier Woods represented The New Day. | |
| 12 | The Miz and Shane McMahon | January 27, 2019 | Royal Rumble | Phoenix, AZ | 1 | 21 | 21 | | |
| 13 | The Usos (Jey Uso and Jimmy Uso) | February 17, 2019 | Elimination Chamber | Houston, TX | 4 | 51 | 51 | | |
| 14 | The Hardy Boyz (Jeff Hardy and Matt Hardy) | April 9, 2019 | SmackDown | Brooklyn, NY | 1 | 21 | 20 | | |
| — | Vacated | April 30, 2019 | SmackDown | Columbus, OH | — | — | — | The Hardy Boyz (Jeff Hardy and Matt Hardy) vacated the title due to Jeff suffering a knee injury that required surgery. | |
| 15 | Daniel Bryan and Rowan | May 7, 2019 | SmackDown | Louisville, KY | 1 (1, 2) | 68 | 68 | Defeated The Usos (Jey Uso and Jimmy Uso) to win the vacant title. | |
| 16 | The New Day (Big E, Kofi Kingston, and Xavier Woods) | July 14, 2019 | Extreme Rules | Philadelphia, PA | 4 | 63 | 62 | This was a triple threat tag team match, also involving Heavy Machinery (Otis and Tucker). Big E and Woods won the match. At the time, Kingston was the reigning WWE Champion and he was not recognized as tag team champion with Big E and Woods, but after The New Day won their sixth title on April 17, 2020, Kingston was retroactively credited for this reign under the Freebird Rule. | |
| 17 | The Revival (Dash Wilder and Scott Dawson) | September 15, 2019 | Clash of Champions | Charlotte, NC | 1 | 54 | 54 | Big E and Xavier Woods represented The New Day. | |
| 18 | The New Day (Big E, Kofi Kingston, and Xavier Woods) | November 8, 2019 | SmackDown | Manchester, England | 5 | 111 | 110 | Big E and Kingston won the match. At the time, Woods was inactive due to injury and he was not recognized as champion with Big E and Kingston, but after The New Day won their sixth title on April 17, 2020, Woods was retroactively credited for this reign under the Freebird Rule. | |
| 19 | The Miz and John Morrison | February 27, 2020 | Super ShowDown | Riyadh, Saudi Arabia | 1 (2, 1) | 50 | 50 | Big E and Kofi Kingston represented The New Day. | |
| 20 | The New Day (Big E, Kofi Kingston, and Xavier Woods) | April 17, 2020 | SmackDown | Orlando, FL | 6 | 93 | 92 | This was a triple threat match between Big E representing The New Day, Jey Uso representing The Usos, and The Miz representing himself and John Morrison. Big E pinned The Miz to win the titles. During this reign, Woods was inactive due to injury, but was credited for this reign under the Freebird Rule. | |
| 21 | Shinsuke Nakamura and Cesaro | July 19, 2020 | The Horror Show at Extreme Rules | Orlando, FL | 1 (1, 2) | 82 | 82 | This was a tables match. Big E and Kofi Kingston represented The New Day. | |
| 22 | The New Day (Kofi Kingston and Xavier Woods) | October 9, 2020 | SmackDown | Orlando, FL | 7 | 3 | 2 | Kingston and Woods won the titles as part of The New Day with Big E; however, the two were drafted to the Raw brand as part of the 2020 WWE Draft immediately after their win, splitting them from Big E and marking their first reign without him. | |
| 23 | The Street Profits (Angelo Dawkins and Montez Ford) | October 12, 2020 | Raw | Orlando, FL | 1 | 88 | 88 | As a result of the 2020 WWE Draft, The New Day (Kofi Kingston and Xavier Woods) were drafted to Raw while then-Raw Tag Team Champions The Street Profits were drafted to SmackDown. To keep the branded championships on their respective brands, WWE official Adam Pearce had the two teams exchange championships. | |
| 24 | Dolph Ziggler and Robert Roode | January 8, 2021 | SmackDown | St. Petersburg, FL | 1 | 128 | 127 | | |
| 25 | Rey Mysterio and Dominik Mysterio | May 16, 2021 | WrestleMania Backlash | Tampa, FL | 1 | 63 | 62 | | |
| 26 | The Usos (Jey Uso and Jimmy Uso) | July 18, 2021 | Money in the Bank; Kickoff | Fort Worth, TX | 5 | 622 | 622 | On the May 20, 2022, episode of SmackDown, The Usos defeated Raw Tag Team Champions RK-Bro (Randy Orton and Riddle) in a Winners Take All match, subsequently becoming recognized as the Undisputed WWE Tag Team Champions. WWE's official title history incorrectly lists their reign as ending on April 2, 2023. | |
WWE: Raw and SmackDown
| 27 | Kevin Owens and Sami Zayn | April 1, 2023 | WrestleMania 39; Night 1 | Inglewood, CA | 1 | 154 | 153 | This match was also for The Usos' (Jey Uso and Jimmy Uso) Raw Tag Team Championship. | |
| 28 | The Judgment Day (Damian Priest and Finn Bálor) | September 2, 2023 | Payback | Pittsburgh, PA | 1 | 35 | 35 | This was a Steel City Street Fight that was also for Kevin Owens and Sami Zayn's Raw Tag Team Championship. | |
| 29 | Cody Rhodes and Jey Uso | October 7, 2023 | Fastlane | Indianapolis, IN | 1 (1, 6) | 9 | 9 | This match was also for The Judgment Day's (Finn Bálor and Damian Priest) Raw Tag Team Championship. | |
| 30 | The Judgment Day (Damian Priest and Finn Bálor) | October 16, 2023 | Raw | Oklahoma City, OK | 2 | 173 | 172 | This match was also for Cody Rhodes and Jey Uso's Raw Tag Team Championship. | |
WWE: SmackDown
| 31 | A-Town Down Under (Austin Theory and Grayson Waller) | April 6, 2024 | WrestleMania XL; Night 1 | Philadelphia, PA | 1 | 90 | 90 | This was a Six-Pack Tag Team Ladder match for both the SmackDown Tag Team Championship and the Raw Tag Team Championship also featuring The Awesome Truth (The Miz and R-Truth), #DIY (Johnny Gargano and Tommaso Ciampa), The New Day (Kofi Kingston and Xavier Woods), and New Catch Republic (Pete Dunne and Tyler Bate). Both sets of titles were hung separately above the ring and the match continued until both sets of titles were won. The Miz and R-Truth won the Raw Tag Team Championship while Theory and Waller won the SmackDown Tag Team Championship. On the April 19, 2024, episode of SmackDown, the title was renamed to WWE Tag Team Championship. | |
| 32 | #DIY (Johnny Gargano and Tommaso Ciampa) | July 5, 2024 | SmackDown | Toronto, ON, Canada | 1 | 28 | 28 | | |
| 33 | The Bloodline (Tama Tonga and Jacob Fatu/Tonga Loa) | August 2, 2024 | SmackDown | Cleveland, OH | 1 | 84 | 84 | Tama Tonga and Jacob Fatu originally won the championship. 21 days later, on the August 23 episode of SmackDown, Fatu relinquished his half of the title to fellow Bloodline member Tonga Loa; WWE recognizes this as a single uninterrupted reign for The Bloodline. | |
| 34 | Motor City Machine Guns (Alex Shelley and Chris Sabin) | October 25, 2024 | SmackDown | Brooklyn, NY | 1 | 42 | 42 | | |
| 35 | #DIY (Johnny Gargano and Tommaso Ciampa) | December 6, 2024 | SmackDown | Minneapolis, MN | 2 | 98 | 98 | | |
| 36 | The Street Profits (Angelo Dawkins and Montez Ford) | March 14, 2025 | SmackDown | Barcelona, Spain | 2 | 119 | 119 | | |
| 37 | The Wyatt Sicks (Dexter Lumis and Joe Gacy) | July 11, 2025 | SmackDown | Nashville, TN | 1 | 196 | 196 | | |
| 38 | The MFTs (Solo Sikoa and Tama Tonga) | January 23, 2026 | SmackDown | Montreal, QC, Canada | 1 (1, 2) | 56 | 55 | The stable was previously known as The Bloodline. | |
| 39 | Damian Priest and R-Truth | March 20, 2026 | SmackDown | Raleigh, NC | 1 (3, 1) | 147 | 147 | JC Mateo defended the title on behalf of Solo Sikoa. | |
| 40 | The MFTs (Tama Tonga and Talla Tonga) | August 14, 2026 | SmackDown | Boston, MA | 1 (3, 1) | 100+ | 100+ | This triple threat tag team match also featured The War Raiders (Erik and Ivar). | |

== Combined reigns ==
As of November 22, 2026.

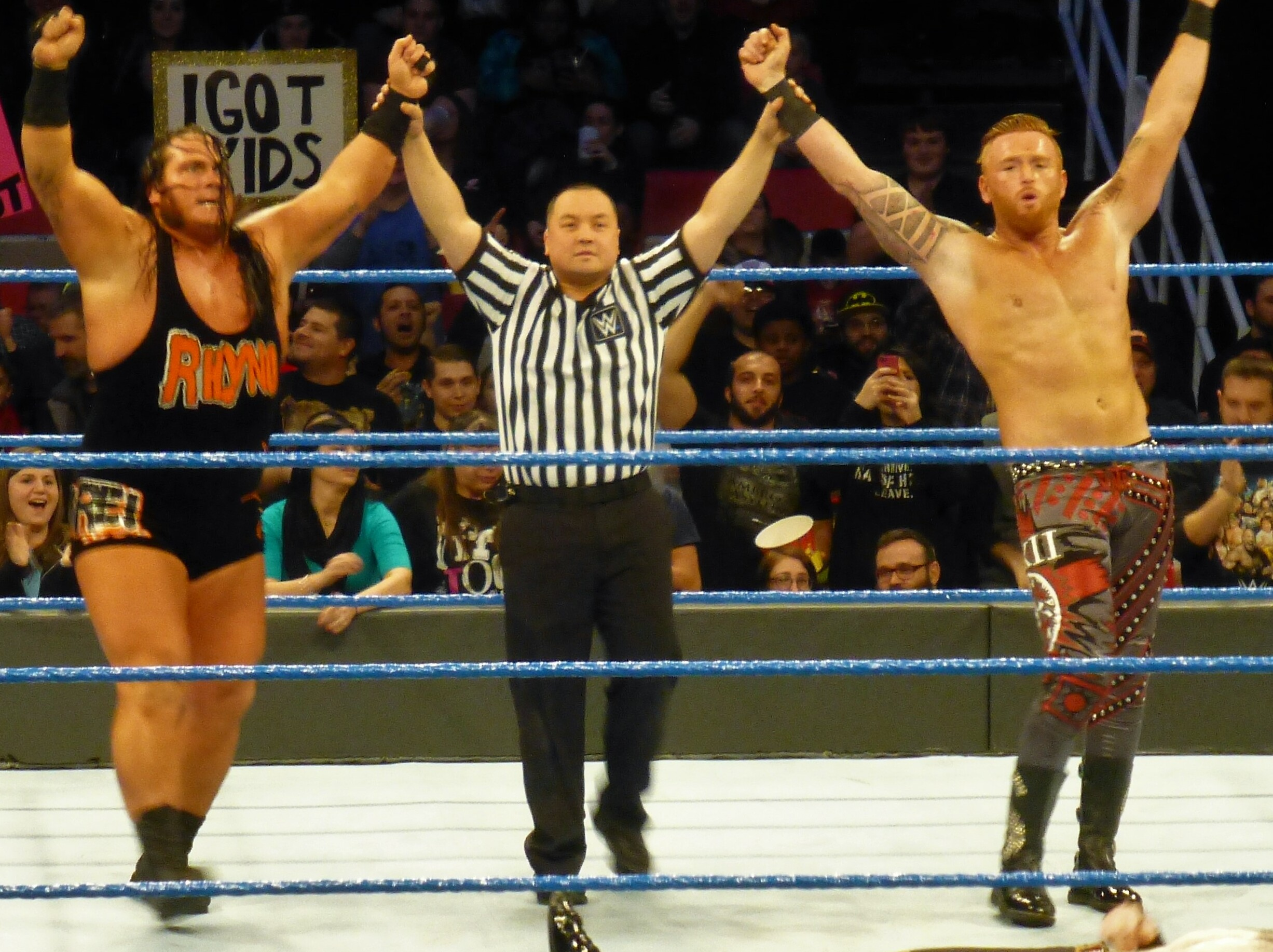
Inaugural champions Heath Slater and Rhyno.

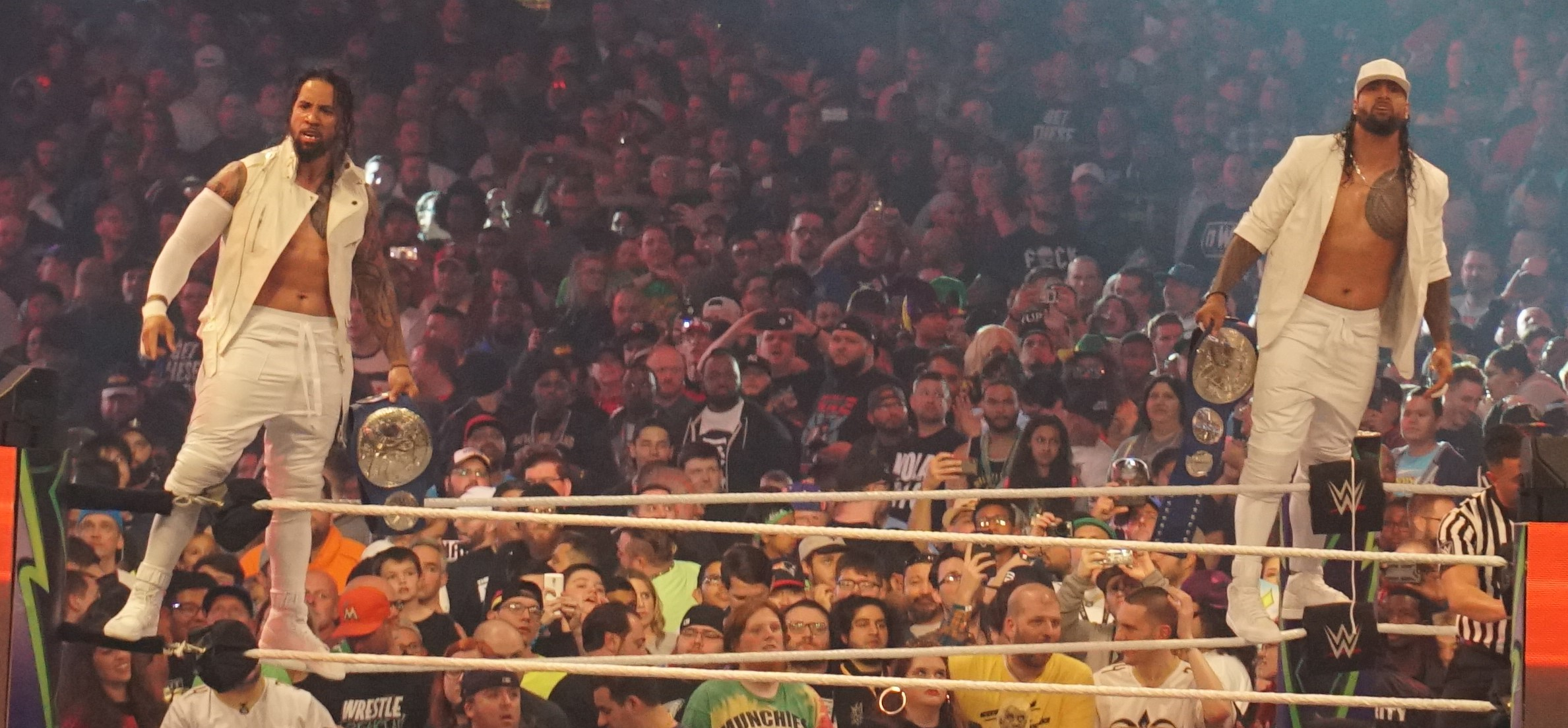
Five-time champions The Usos (Jey Uso and Jimmy Uso); their fifth reign is the longest male tag team championship reign in WWE at 622 days. As a team, they have the longest combined reign at 1,002 days.

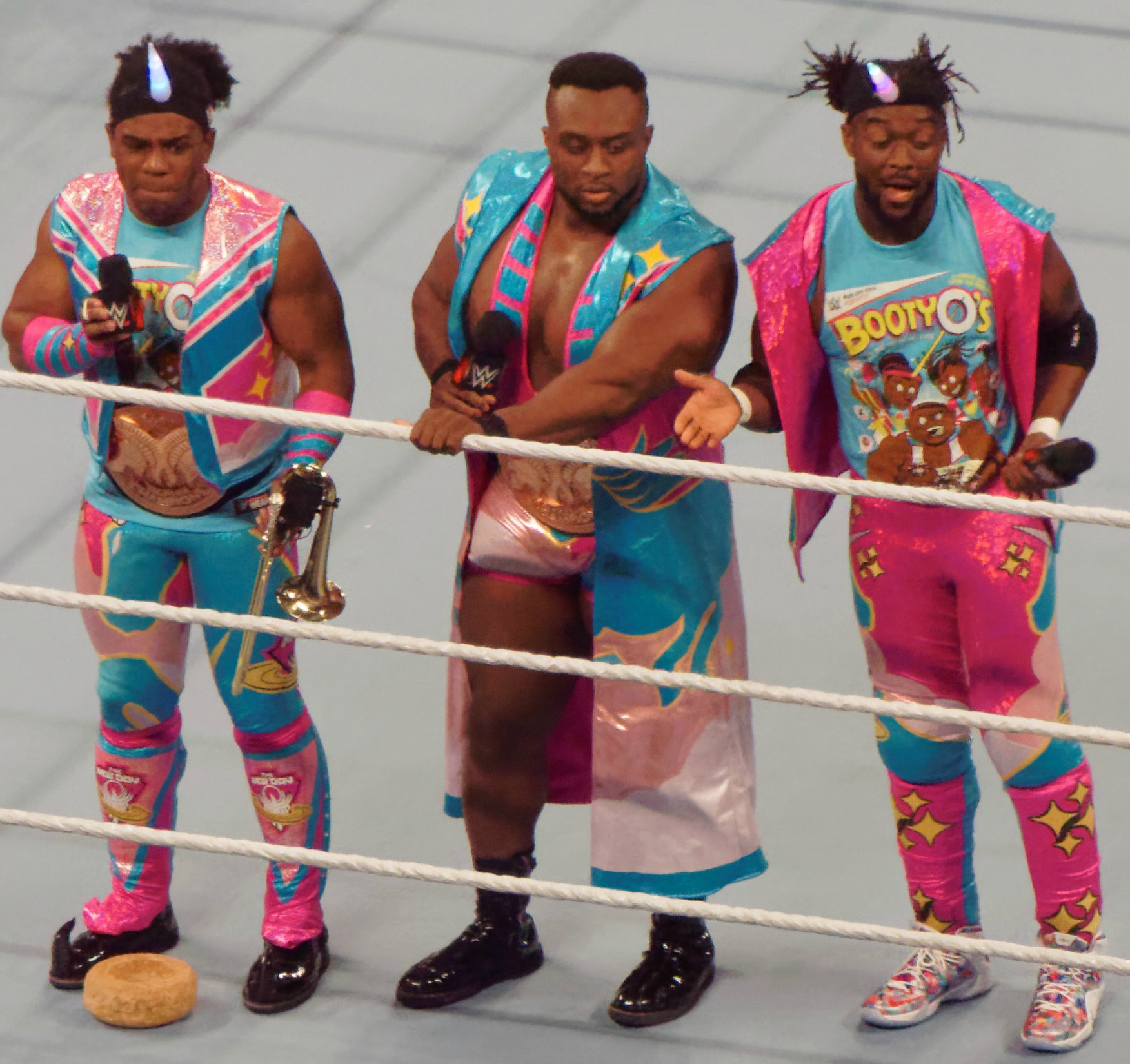
Record seven-time champions The New Day: Xavier Woods (left) and Kofi Kingston (right) are recognized for all seven reigns, while Big E (center) is only recognized for the first six reigns where he reigned alongside Kingston and Woods under the Freebird Rule.

=== By team ===
| † | Indicates the current champions |

| Rank | Team | No. of reigns | Combined days | Combined days rec. by WWE |
|---|---|---|---|---|
| 1 | The Usos (Jey Uso and Jimmy Uso) | 5 | 1,002 | 1,001 |
| 2 | The New Day (Note: For the first six reigns, all three members were recognized as champion under the Freebird Rule, while for the seventh reign, only Kingston and Woods are recognized as Big E was split from the group.) (Kofi Kingston and Xavier Woods/Big E, Kofi Kingston, and Xavier Woods) | 7/6 | 380/377 | 375/372 |
| 3 | The Judgment Day (Finn Bálor and Damian Priest) | 2 | 208 | 207 |
| 4 | The Street Profits (Angelo Dawkins and Montez Ford) | 2 | 207 | |
| 5 | The Wyatt Sicks (Dexter Lumis and Joe Gacy) | 1 | 196 | |
| 6 | Kevin Owens and Sami Zayn | 1 | 154 | 153 |
| 7 | Damian Priest and R-Truth | 1 | 147 | |
| 8 | The Bludgeon Brothers (Harper and Rowan) | 1 | 135 | |
| 9 | Dolph Ziggler and Robert Roode | 1 | 128 | 127 |
| 10 | #DIY (Johnny Gargano and Tommaso Ciampa) | 2 | 126 | |
| 11 | The Bar (Cesaro and Sheamus) | 1 | 103 | 102 |
| 12 | The MFTs † (Tama Tonga and Talla Tonga) | 1 | 100+ | |
| 13 | A-Town Down Under (Austin Theory and Grayson Waller) | 1 | 90 | |
| 14 | American Alpha (Chad Gable and Jason Jordan) | 1 | 84 | 83 |
| 14 | Heath Slater and Rhyno | 1 | 84 | 83 |
| 16 | Shinsuke Nakamura and Cesaro | 1 | 82 | |
| 17 | Daniel Bryan and Rowan | 1 | 68 | |
| 18 | Rey Mysterio and Dominik Mysterio | 1 | 63 | 62 |
| 19 | The MFTs (Solo Sikoa and Tama Tonga) | 1 | 56 | |
| 20 | The Revival (Dash Wilder and Scott Dawson) | 1 | 54 | |
| 21 | The Miz and John Morrison | 1 | 50 | |
| 22 | Motor City Machine Guns (Alex Shelley and Chris Sabin) | 1 | 42 | |
| 23 | The Wyatt Family (Bray Wyatt, Luke Harper, and Randy Orton) | 1 | 23 | |
| 24 | The Bloodline (Tama Tonga and Jacob Fatu/Tonga Loa) (Note: Tama Tonga originally won the championship with Jacob Fatu, but Fatu relinquished his half of the title to fellow group member Tonga Loa. WWE recognizes this as a single uninterrupted reign for The Bloodline.) | 1 | 21/63 | 84 |
| 24 | The Hardy Boyz (Jeff Hardy and Matt Hardy) | 1 | 21 | 20 |
| 24 | The Miz and Shane McMahon | 1 | 21 | |
| 27 | Cody Rhodes and Jey Uso | 1 | 9 | |

=== By wrestler ===
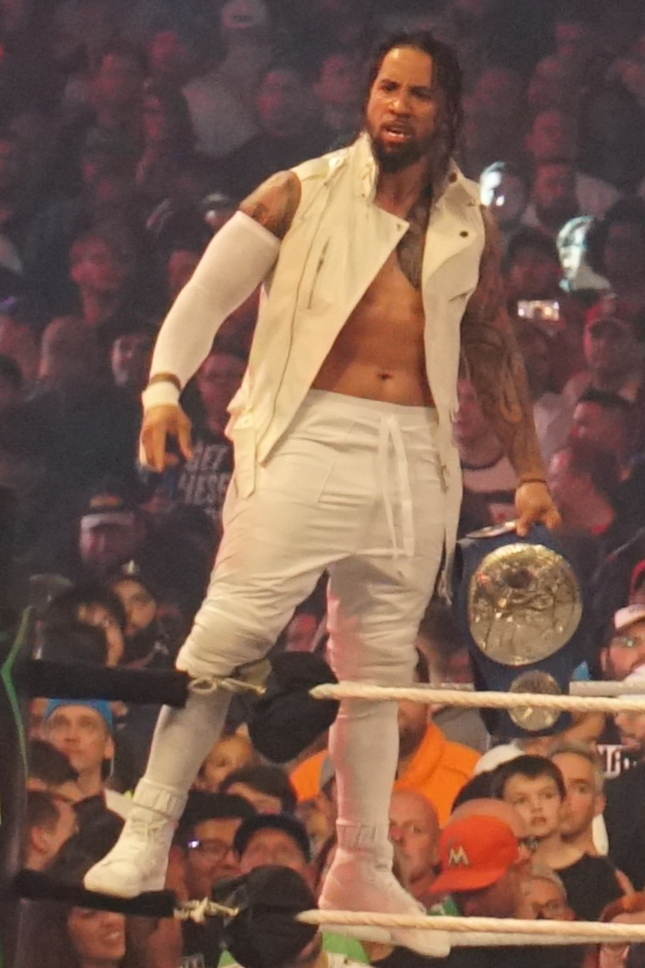
Individually, Jey Uso has the longest combined reign at 1,011 days (1,010 days as recognized by WWE).

| Rank | Wrestler | No. of reigns | Combined days | Combined days rec. by WWE |
|---|---|---|---|---|
| 1 | Jey Uso | 6 | 1,011 | 1,010 |
| 2 | Jimmy Uso | 5 | 1,002 | 1,001 |
| 3 | Kofi Kingston | 7 | 380 | 375 |
| 3 | Xavier Woods | 7 | 380 | 375 |
| 5 | Big E | 6 | 377 | 372 |
| 6 | Damian Priest | 3 | 355 | 354 |
| 7 | Tama Tonga † | 3 | 240+ | |
| 8 | Finn Bálor | 2 | 208 | 207 |
| 9 | Angelo Dawkins | 2 | 207 | |
| 9 | Montez Ford | 2 | 207 | |
| 11 | Rowan | 2 | 203 | |
| 12 | Joe Gacy | 1 | 196 | |
| 12 | Dexter Lumis | 1 | 196 | |
| 14 | Cesaro | 2 | 185 | 184 |
| 15 | Luke Harper | 2 (Note: In his second reign, Luke Harper's ring name was shortened to Harper.) | 158 | |
| 16 | Kevin Owens | 1 | 154 | 153 |
| 16 | Sami Zayn | 1 | 154 | 153 |
| 18 | R-Truth | 1 | 147 | |
| 19 | Dolph Ziggler | 1 | 128 | 127 |
| 19 | Robert Roode | 1 | 128 | 127 |
| 21 | Johnny Gargano | 2 | 126 | |
| 21 | Tommaso Ciampa | 2 | 126 | |
| 23 | Sheamus | 1 | 103 | 102 |
| 24 | Talla Tonga † | 1 | 100+ | |
| 25 | Austin Theory | 1 | 90 | |
| 25 | Grayson Waller | 1 | 90 | |
| 27 | Chad Gable | 1 | 84 | 83 |
| 27 | Heath Slater | 1 | 84 | 83 |
| 27 | Jason Jordan | 1 | 84 | 83 |
| 27 | Rhyno | 1 | 84 | 83 |
| 31 | Shinsuke Nakamura | 1 | 82 | |
| 32 | The Miz | 2 | 71 | |
| 33 | Daniel Bryan | 1 | 68 | |
| 34 | Dominik Mysterio | 1 | 63 | 62 |
| 34 | Rey Mysterio | 1 | 63 | 62 |
| 34 | Tonga Loa | 1 | 63 | |
| 37 | Solo Sikoa | 1 | 56 | |
| 38 | Dash Wilder | 1 | 54 | |
| 38 | Scott Dawson | 1 | 54 | |
| 40 | John Morrison | 1 | 50 | |
| 41 | Alex Shelley | 1 | 42 | |
| 41 | Chris Sabin | 1 | 42 | |
| 43 | Bray Wyatt | 1 | 23 | |
| 43 | Randy Orton | 1 | 23 | |
| 45 | Jacob Fatu | 1 | 21 | |
| 45 | Jeff Hardy | 1 | 21 | 20 |
| 45 | Matt Hardy | 1 | 21 | 20 |
| 45 | Shane McMahon | 1 | 21 | |
| 49 | Cody Rhodes | 1 | 9 | |

== See also ==
- Tag team championships in WWE
