= Theorema (disambiguation) =

Theorema is a genus of butterflies.

Theorema is also Latin for "theorem", and a number of theorems are sometimes referred to by a Latin name in English, most notably two theorems of Carl Friedrich Gauss:

- Theorema Egregium, "Remarkable Theorem", best-known example
- Aureum Theorema, "Golden Theorem", better-known as quadratic reciprocity

== See also ==
- Teorema (disambiguation)
- Theory (disambiguation)
- Theorem
