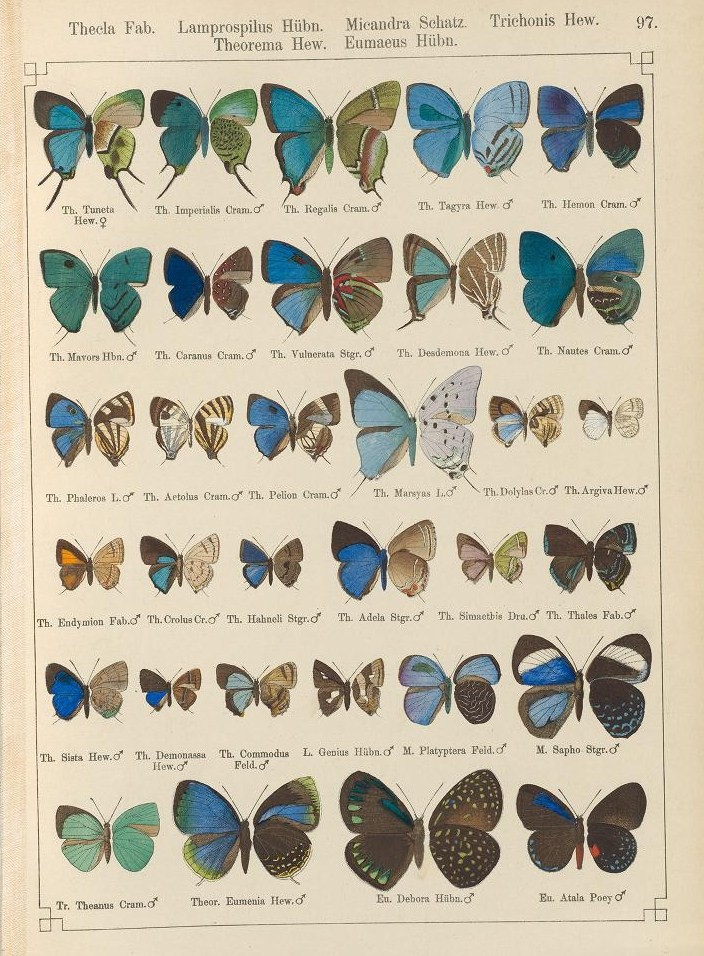

Scientific classification
- Kingdom: Animalia
- Phylum: Arthropoda
- Class: Insecta
- Order: Lepidoptera
- Family: Lycaenidae
- Genus: Theorema
- Species: T. eumenia

Binomial name
- Theorema eumenia Hewitson, 1865

= Theorema eumenia =

Species of butterfly

Theorema eumenia is a Neotropical butterfly in the family Lycaenidae. It is found in Costa Rica, Panama and Colombia.
