= Thiry =

Thiry is a surname. Notable people with the name include:

- Bruno Thiry (born 1962), Belgian rally driver
- Jean Bastien-Thiry (1927–1963), attempted to assassinate French President Charles de Gaulle
- Jules Thiry (1898–1931), Belgian water polo player
- Louis Thiry (born 1935), French organist, composer and pedagogue
- Marcel Thiry (1897–1977), French-speaking Belgian poet
- Paul Thiry (architect) (1904–1993), known as the father of modernism in the Pacific Northwest

== See also ==
- Thiery (surname)
- Thierry, given name and surname
