= Teorema (disambiguation) =

Teorema is a 1968 film by Pier Paolo Pasolini.

Teorema may also refer to:

- Teorema (journal), an academic journal of philosophy
- "Teorema" (song), a 1981 song by Marco Ferradini
- "Teorema", a 1976 song by Brian Bennett from the soundtrack to The Opening of Misty Beethoven
- "Teorema", a 1985 song by Legião Urbana from the album Legião Urbana
- "Teorema", a 1992 song by Tony Tammaro from the album Da Granto Farò il Cantanto
- "Teorema", a 2007 song by Miguel Bosé from the album Papitour

== See also ==
- Theorema (disambiguation)
- Theory (disambiguation)
- Theorem
