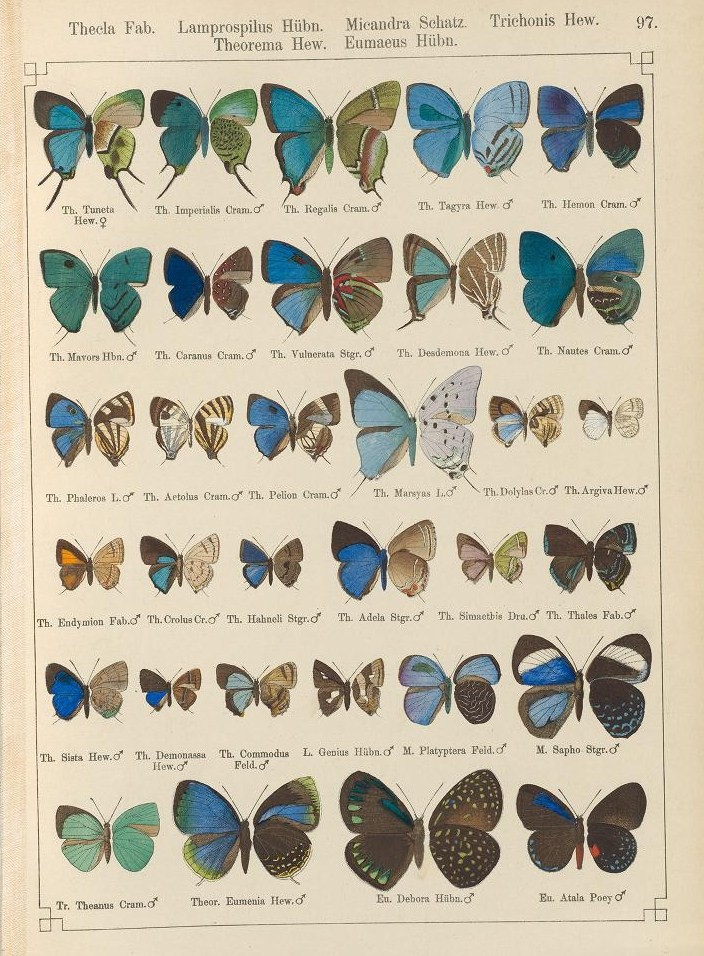
- Theorema sapho as Micandra sapho in Exotische Schmetterlinge

Scientific classification
- Domain: Eukaryota
- Kingdom: Animalia
- Phylum: Arthropoda
- Class: Insecta
- Order: Lepidoptera
- Family: Lycaenidae
- Genus: Theorema
- Species: T. sapho

Binomial name
- Theorema sapho (Staudinger, 1888)

= Theorema sapho =

Species of butterfly

Theorema sapho is a Neotropical butterfly in the family Lycaenidae. It is found in Colombia.
