= WWE Tag Team Championship =

Men's professional wrestling championship

- The current WWE Tag Team Championship belt with default side plates (2024–present).

Details
- Promotion: WWE
- Brand: SmackDown
- Date established: August 30, 2016
- Current champions: The MFTs (Tama Tonga and Talla Tonga)
- Date won: August 14, 2026

Other names
- WWE SmackDown Tag Team Championship (2016–2024); Undisputed WWE Tag Team Championship (2022–2024) (Note: In tandem with the then-WWE Raw Tag Team Championship.); WWE Tag Team Championship (2024–present)
Statistics
- First champion: Heath Slater and Rhyno
- Most reigns: As tag team (7 reigns): The New Day (Note: During their first six reigns, Big E, Kofi Kingston, and Xavier Woods were all recognized as champion under the Freebird Rule, but during their seventh reign, only Kingston and Woods were recognized as champion as Big E was split from the team as a result of the 2020 WWE Draft.); As individual (7 reigns): Kofi Kingston; Xavier Woods
- Longest reign: The Usos (Jey Uso and Jimmy Uso) (5th reign, 622 days)
- Shortest reign: The New Day (Kofi Kingston and Xavier Woods) (7th reign, 3 days)
- Oldest champion: R-Truth (54 years, 60 days)
- Youngest champion: Dominik Mysterio (24 years, 41 days)
- Heaviest champion: The Wyatt Family (Bray Wyatt, Luke Harper, and Randy Orton) (810 lb (370 kg) combined)
- Lightest champion: The Mysterios (Rey Mysterio and Dominik Mysterio) (375 lb (170 kg) combined)

The WWE Tag Team Championship is a men's professional wrestling world tag team championship created and promoted by the American promotion WWE, defended on the SmackDown brand division. It is one of two male tag team championships for WWE's main roster, along with the World Tag Team Championship on Raw. The current champions are The MFTs (Tama Tonga and Talla Tonga), who are in their first reign as a team, while individually, it is Tama's third reign and Talla's first. They won the title by defeating previous champions Damian Priest and R-Truth and The War Raiders (Erik and Ivar) in a triple threat tag team match on the August 14, 2026, episode of SmackDown.

The championship was originally established as the SmackDown Tag Team Championship on August 30, 2016, and Heath Slater and Rhyno were the inaugural champions. It was introduced for the SmackDown brand as a second title for tag teams in the promotion to complement the previous WWE Tag Team Championship, which became exclusive to Raw in the 2016 WWE Draft following the reintroduction of the brand split and renamed as Raw Tag Team Championship. From May 2022 until April 2024, both titles were held and defended together as the Undisputed WWE Tag Team Championship, with each maintaining their individual lineages. Under the Undisputed banner, both titles simultaneously became the first tag team championships to be defended in the main event of WWE's flagship event, WrestleMania, which occurred as the main event of WrestleMania 39 – Night 1 in April 2023. The titles would again be defended in the main event of a pay-per-view and livestreaming event at Night of Champions the following month. The titles were then split at WrestleMania XL in April 2024 with the SmackDown Tag Team Championship subsequently renamed as the WWE Tag Team Championship with the Raw title becoming the World Tag Team Championship.

== History ==
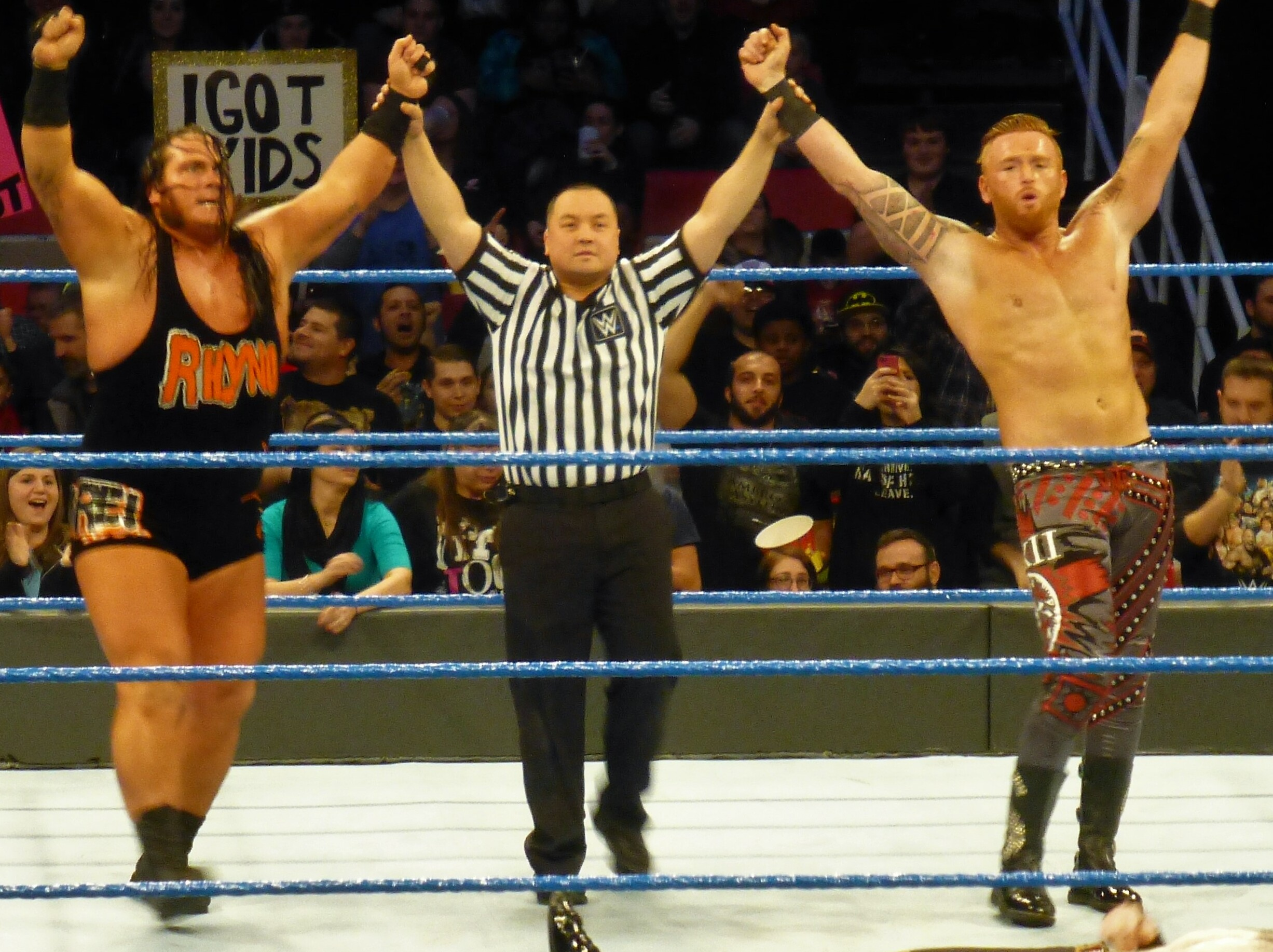
Inaugural champions Rhyno (left) and Heath Slater (right), who won the title as the SmackDown Tag Team Championship

During WWE's original brand split (2002–2011), in which the professional wrestling promotion divided its roster into "brands" where wrestlers were assigned to exclusively perform on each brands' respective weekly television program, the men's world tag team championship of the SmackDown brand was the previous WWE Tag Team Championship, which was established in 2002 to be the counterpart to the promotion's original World Tag Team Championship, which was designated to Raw. At WrestleMania 25 in April 2009, the titles were unified as the Unified WWE Tag Team Championship, although both titles remained independently active until August 2010 when the original World Tag Team Championship was deactivated in favor of the WWE Tag Team Championship, which then became the sole tag team championship in WWE, available to both brands. The first brand split then ended in August 2011.

In July 2016, WWE reintroduced the brand split and during the 2016 draft, reigning WWE Tag Team Champions The New Day (Big E, Kofi Kingston, and Xavier Woods) were drafted to Raw, leaving SmackDown without a tag team title. Over the course of the following month, SmackDown general manager Daniel Bryan stated that he wanted to build up the tag team division before introducing a championship. Immediately following SummerSlam on the August 30, 2016, episode of SmackDown Live, Bryan and SmackDown commissioner Shane McMahon introduced the SmackDown Tag Team Championship; the WWE Tag Team Championship was subsequently renamed Raw Tag Team Championship. An eight-team tournament was then scheduled to determine the inaugural champions, culminating in a final match at Backlash on September 11, 2016. The team of Heath Slater and Rhyno defeated The Usos (Jey Uso and Jimmy Uso) in the tournament final to become the inaugural champions.

In 2019, WWE's developmental territory NXT became the promotion's third major brand when it was moved to the USA Network in September, thus making the NXT Tag Team Championship the third major tag team title for men in WWE. However, this recognition was reversed when NXT reverted to its original function as a developmental brand in September 2021.

The Usos holding both the Raw and SmackDown tag titles, which when held together were known as the Undisputed WWE Tag Team Championship; despite maintaining their individual lineages

During the May 20, 2022, episode of SmackDown, reigning SmackDown Tag Team Champions The Usos (Jey Uso and Jimmy Uso) defeated reigning Raw Tag Team Champions RK-Bro (Randy Orton and Riddle) in a Winners Take All match to claim both championships and become recognized as the Undisputed WWE Tag Team Champions. WWE had billed the match as a championship unification match; however, both titles remained independently active. The Usos had defended both titles together across both brands as the Undisputed WWE Tag Team Championship, but on a couple of occasions in early 2023, they also defended the titles separately.

In the main event of WrestleMania 39 Night 1, The Usos (Jey Uso and Jimmy Uso) defended the Undisputed WWE Tag Team Championship against the team of Kevin Owens and Sami Zayn. This subsequently made both the Raw and SmackDown titles the first tag team championships to be defended in the main event of WWE's flagship event, WrestleMania. At the event, Owens and Zayn defeated The Usos to become champions. The titles would again be defended in the main event of a pay-per-view and livestreaming event at Night of Champions the following month on May 27 when Owens and Zayn retained the titles against The Bloodline (Roman Reigns and Solo Sikoa).

At WrestleMania XL Night 1 on April 6, 2024, The Judgment Day (Finn Bálor and Damian Priest) defended the Undisputed WWE Tag Team Championship in a Six-Pack Tag Team Ladder match in which both sets of championships had to be retrieved for the match to end. As a result, the championships were split with A-Town Down Under (Austin Theory and Grayson Waller) winning the SmackDown Tag Team Championship while Awesome Truth (The Miz and R-Truth) won the Raw title. On the April 19 episode of SmackDown, the SmackDown Tag Team Championship was renamed as the WWE Tag Team Championship with a new set of title belts. This came just a few days after the Raw Tag Team Championship was renamed as the World Tag Team Championship with its own new title belts.

== Inaugural tournament ==
Quarterfinals; SmackDown; August 23–30, 2016
American Alpha (Chad Gable and Jason Jordan)	Pinfall
Breezango (Fandango and Tyler Breeze)	10:13
The Usos (Jey Uso and Jimmy Uso)	Pinfall
The Ascension (Konnor and Viktor)	3:49
The Hype Bros (Mojo Rawley and Zack Ryder)	Pinfall
The Vaudevillains (Aiden English and Simon Gotch)	2:50
The Headbangers (Mosh and Thrasher)	2:54
Heath Slater and Rhyno	Pinfall

Semifinals; SmackDown; September 6, 2016
American Alpha	Pinfall
The Usos	0:28
The Hype Bros	7:03
Heath Slater and Rhyno	Pinfall

Final; Backlash; September 11, 2016
The Usos (Note: When Chad Gable suffered an injury (kayfabe) after defeating The Usos, American Alpha were removed from the final. The Usos then defeated The Hype Bros at Backlash in a second chance tag team match to replace American Alpha in the final.)	10:02
Heath Slater and Rhyno	Pinfall

== Belt designs ==
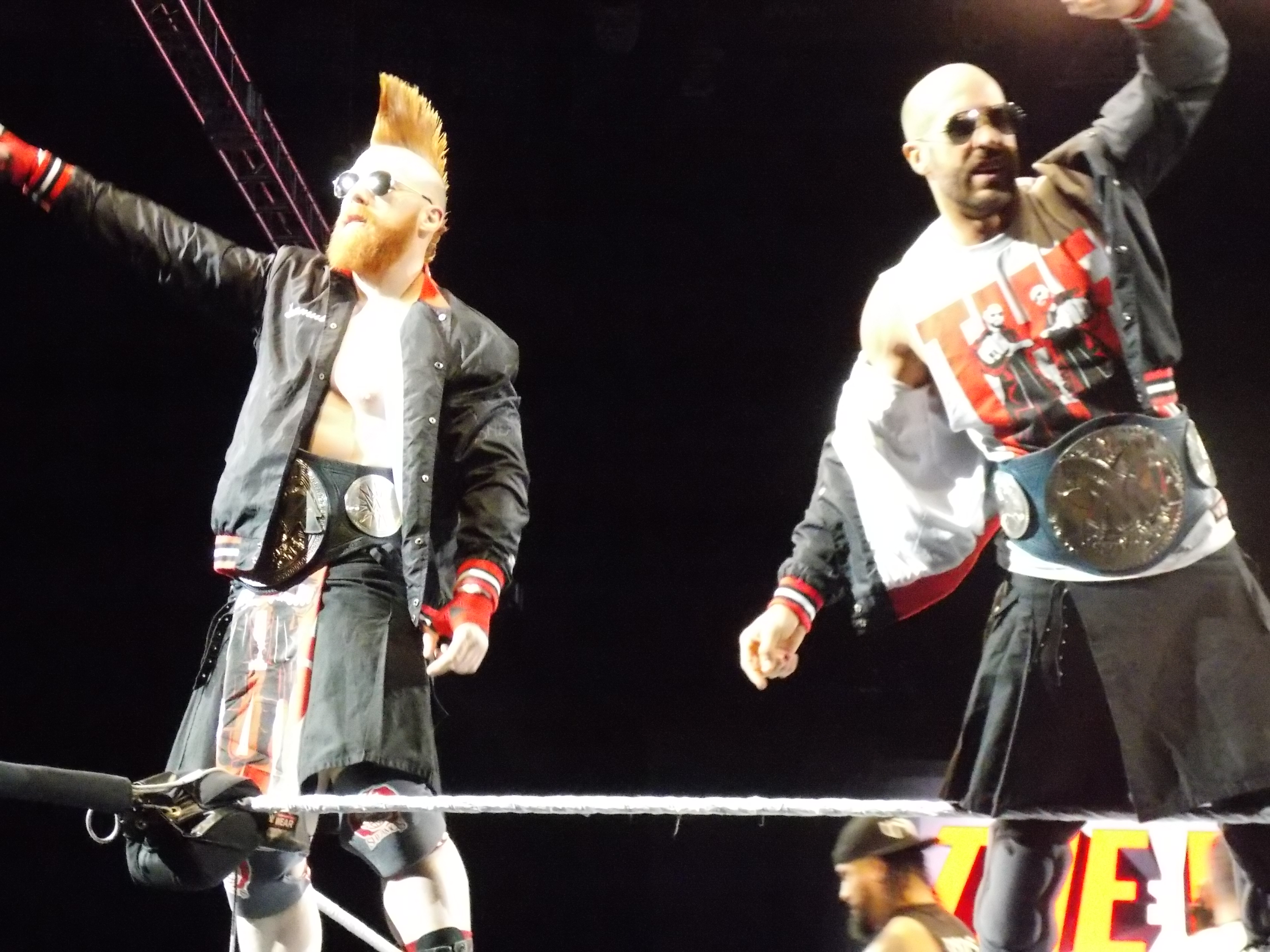
One-time champions The Bar (Sheamus and Cesaro) with the original design of the title when it was known as the SmackDown Tag Team Championship (2016–2024).

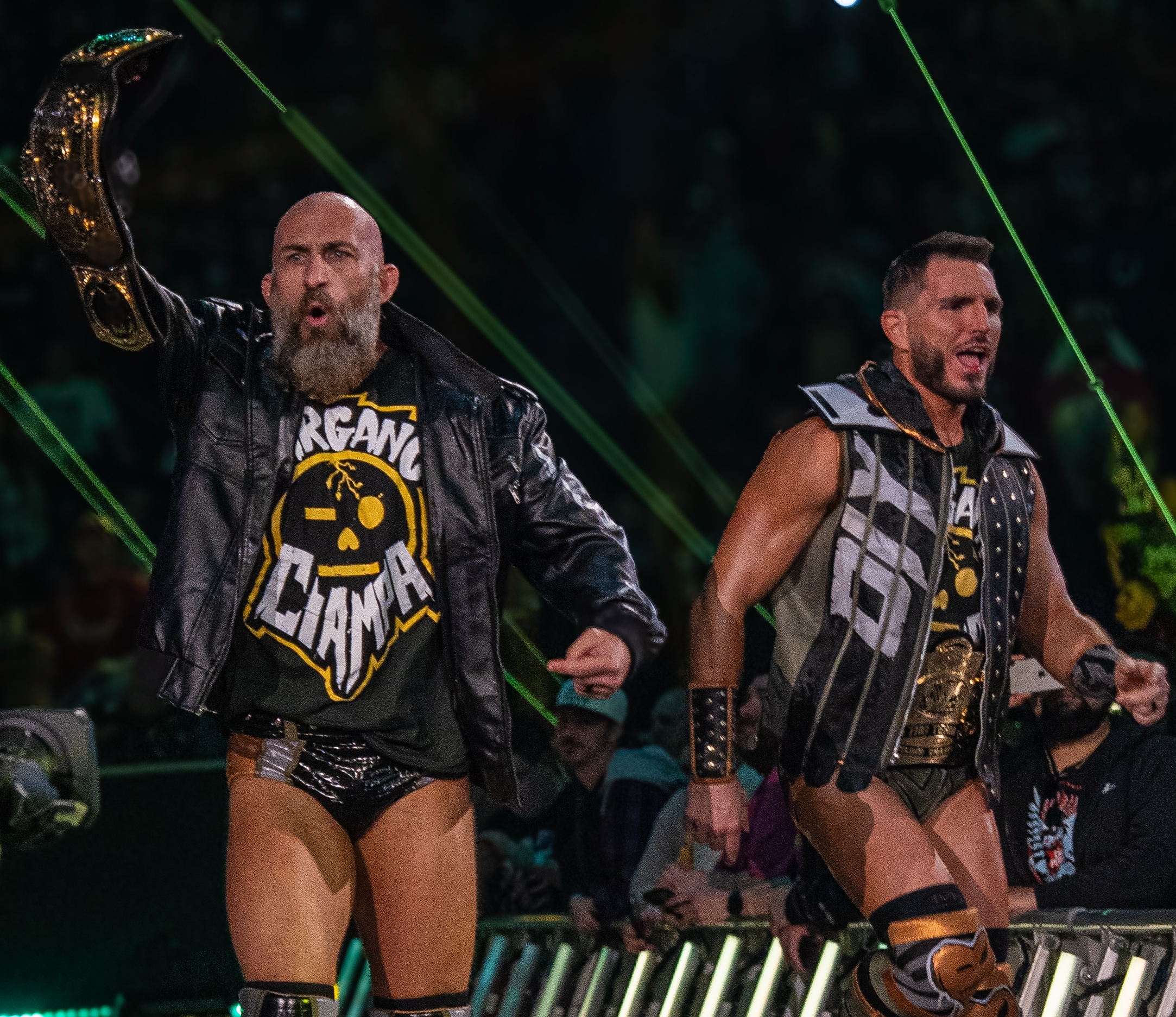
Two-time champions #DIY (Tommaso Ciampa and Johnny Gargano), with the current design of the titles after they were rebranded to the WWE Tag Team Championship

When the championship was first introduced as the SmackDown Tag Team Championship, they featured the same physical design as the 2010 to 2016 version of the previous WWE Tag Team Championship (which became the Raw Tag Team Championship), with the differences being that the leather straps were blue as opposed to the former's original black and the plates were silver as opposed to the former's original copper. The renamed Raw Tag Team Championship belts were then updated on December 19, 2016, with silver plates on red straps to bring both sets of titles in line with each other. While all other WWE championship belts were updated to feature customizable side plates for the champion's logos, the Raw and SmackDown tag titles were the only championship belts in the promotion that lacked this feature.

In conjunction with the SmackDown Tag Team Championship being renamed as WWE Tag Team Championship on April 19, 2024, the belts also received a new design. The updated design resembles the title belts of the original World Tag Team Championship used from 1985 to 2002 and the 2002 to 2010 version of the previous WWE Tag Team Championship has combined to the Attitude and Ruthless Aggression eras belts. Unlike WWE's other championship belts of the modern era, which have three plates (a centerplate and two side plates), the WWE Tag Team Championship has five gold plates on a black leather strap. At the center of the center plate is a globe with the WWE logo over it. Above the globe at the top of the plate is a crown, while below the globe are two black banners. The first black banner says "TAG TEAM" written in gold while the one below that says "WRESTLING CHAMPIONS", also written in gold. On the opposing sides of the globe are two dragons facing inwards. Filigree fills in the rest of the plate, which has an ornamented border. Like all of WWE's championship belts, the two inner side plates feature a removable center section which can be replaced with the reigning champion's logo; the default side plates feature the WWE logo over a globe. The two smaller outer side plates have a shield design with two wrestlers grappling.

== Reigns ==
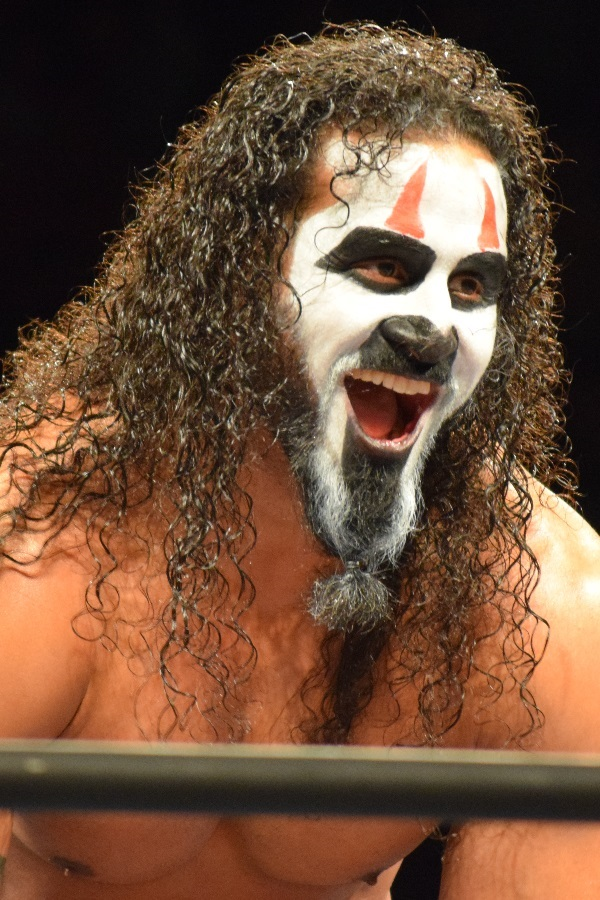
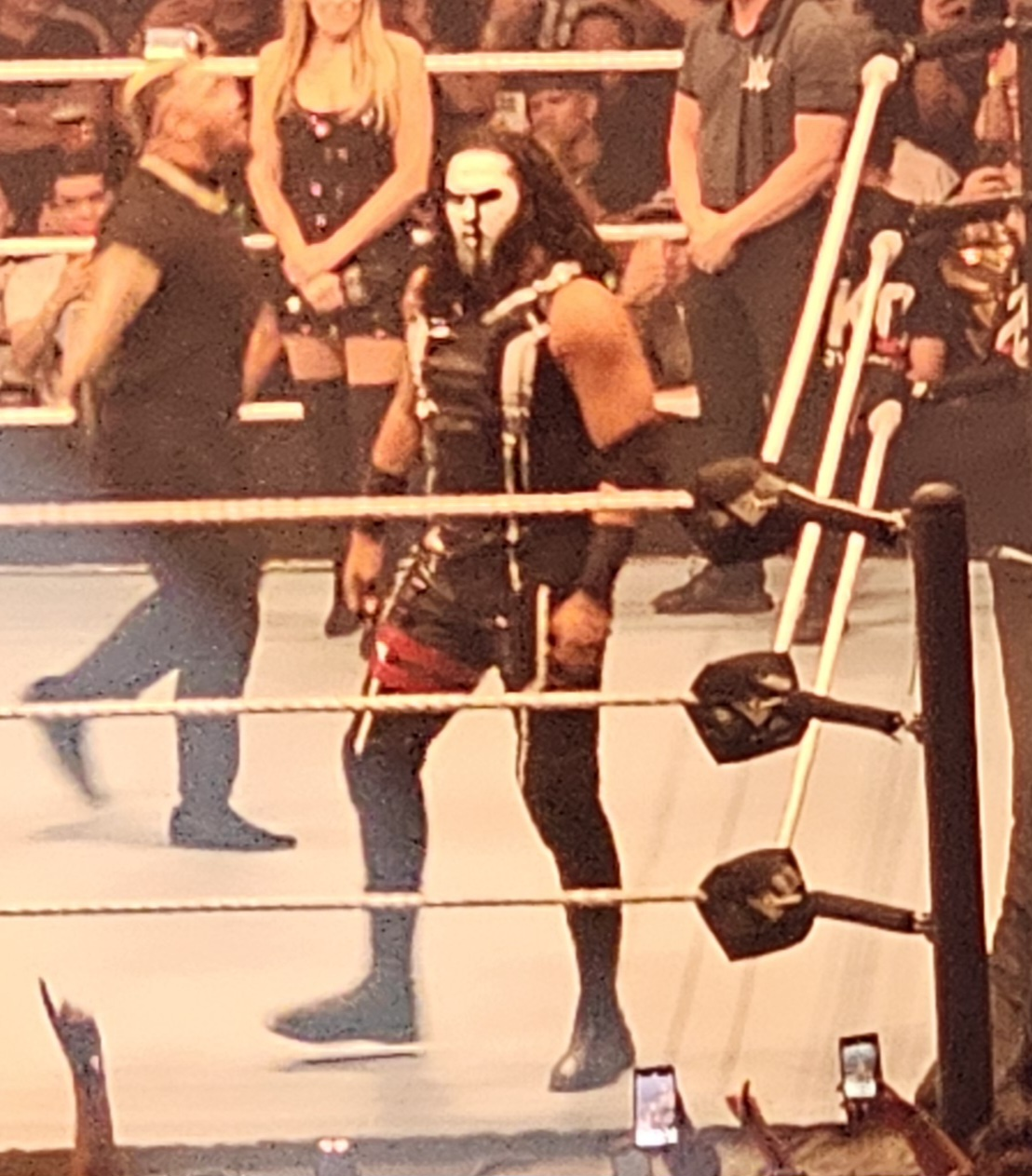
Current champions The MFTs (Tama Tonga and Talla Tonga)

As of November 10, 2026, overall there have been 40 reigns between 26 teams composed of 49 individual champions, and one vacancy. The team of Heath Slater and Rhyno were the inaugural champions. The New Day (Kofi Kingston and Xavier Woods) have the most reigns at seven, both as a team and individually, and their seventh is the shortest reign for the title at 3 days (2 days as recognized by WWE); during their first six reigns, Big E was also recognized as champion under the Freebird Rule. The Usos (Jey Uso and Jimmy Uso) have the longest singular reign at 622 days for their fifth reign, and they have the longest combined reign as a team at 1,002 days, while individually, Jey has the longest combined reign at 1,011 days (1,010 days as recognized by WWE). The oldest champion is R-Truth, winning the title at 54 years old, while the youngest is Dominik Mysterio when he won it at 24.

The MFTs (Tama Tonga and Talla Tonga) are the current champions in their first reign as a team, while individually, it is Tama's third reign and Talla's first. They won the title by defeating previous champions Damian Priest and R-Truth and The War Raiders (Erik and Ivar) in a triple threat tag team match on the August 14, 2026, episode of SmackDown in Boston, Massachusetts.

== See also ==
- Tag team championships in WWE

== Notes ==
Sporting positions
Preceded by WWE World Tag Team Championship (original version)	WWE's top tag team championship 2016–present	Succeeded by Current
