= Austin Theory =

American professional wrestler (born 1997)

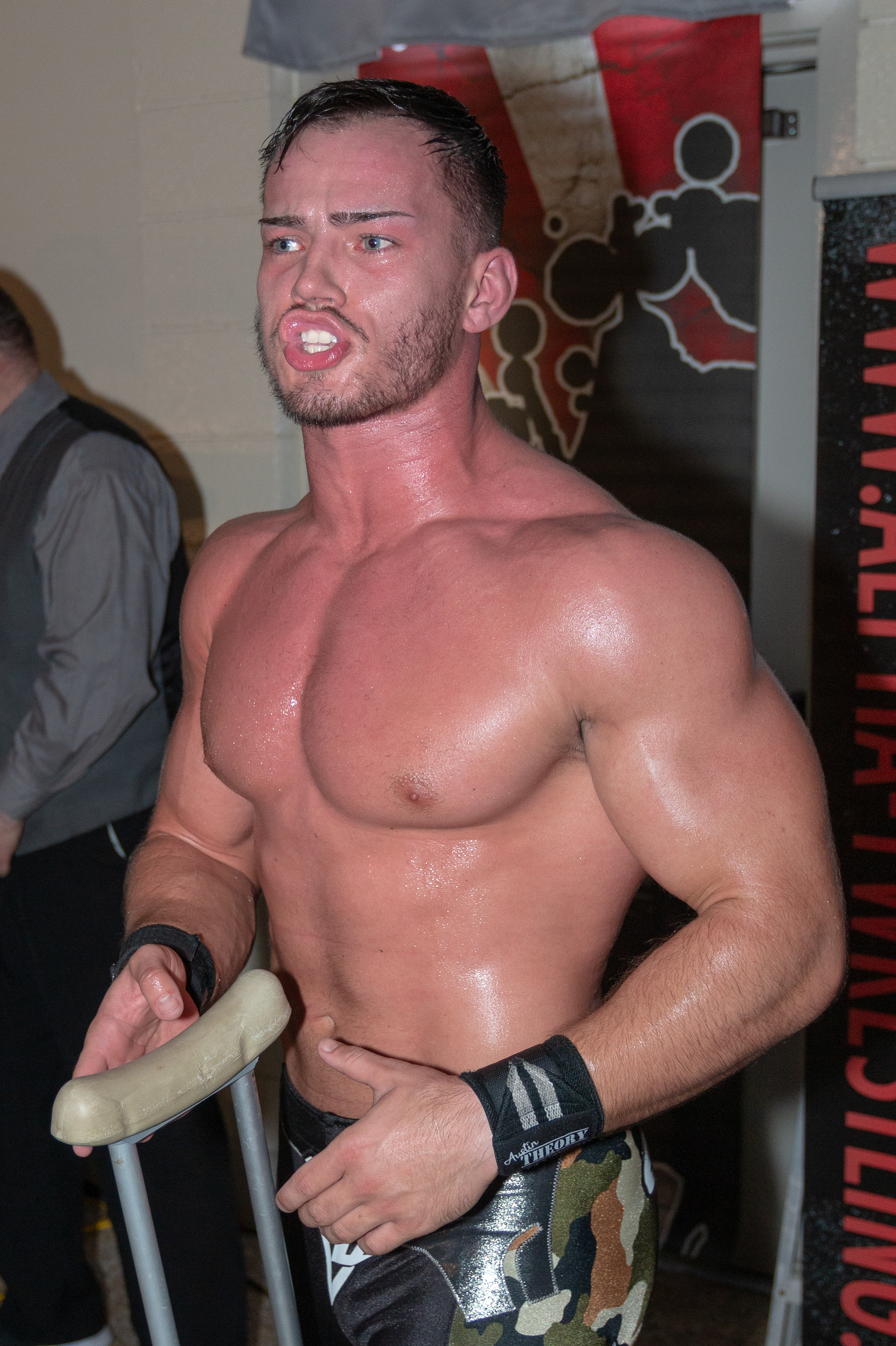
- Theory in 2019

Personal information
- Born: Austin Tyler White; August 2, 1997 (age 29) McDonough, Georgia, U.S.

Professional wrestling career
- Ring name(s): Austin Theory; Theory
- Billed height: 6 ft 1 in (185 cm)
- Billed weight: 220 lb (100 kg)
- Billed from: Atlanta, Georgia
- Trained by: AR Fox; WWA4 Wrestling School; WWE Performance Center
- Debut: April 29, 2016

Austin Tyler White (born August 2, 1997) is an American professional wrestler. As of August 2019, he is signed to WWE, where he performs on the Raw brand under the ring name Austin Theory and is a member of The Vision stable.

Prior to joining WWE, he competed on the independent circuit, including several promotions under the World Wrestling Network (WWN) umbrella, such as Full Impact Pro (FIP) and Evolve – along the way winning the WWN Championship, FIP World Heavyweight Championship, and the Evolve Championship. He also wrestled in Mexico for The Crash Lucha Libre, where he is a former The Crash Heavyweight Champion, and Consejo Mundial de Lucha Libre (CMLL).

Theory signed with WWE in 2019, where he was assigned to the NXT brand. He made his debut on the Raw brand in 2020 and was then sent to NXT again later that same year where he became a member of The Way stable. After being called up to the Raw Brand again in 2021, he became a two-time WWE United States Champion and the winner of the 2022 Money in the Bank ladder match. He was the first wrestler to cash-in his Money in the Bank briefcase for a secondary title. In 2023, Theory was drafted to the SmackDown brand where he began teaming with Grayson Waller as A-Town Down Under, winning the WWE Tag Team Championship at WrestleMania 40. In 2025, Theory joined The Vision stable and became a two-time World Tag Team Champion with stablemates Logan Paul and Bron Breakker.

== Early life ==
Austin Tyler White was born on August 2, 1997, in the Atlanta suburb of McDonough, Georgia. His parents were divorced prior to his birth. White has been a fan of professional wrestling since childhood, citing John Cena as a huge influence and having dreams of joining WWE since he was eight years old. In 2015, at the age of 17, he placed first in the NPC Georgia Bodybuilding Championship, Teen Men category. According to White, he only competed in bodybuilding as a strategy to get noticed by WWE scouts after a friend told him they attended bodybuilding shows.

== Professional wrestling career ==
=== Independent circuit (2016–2019) ===
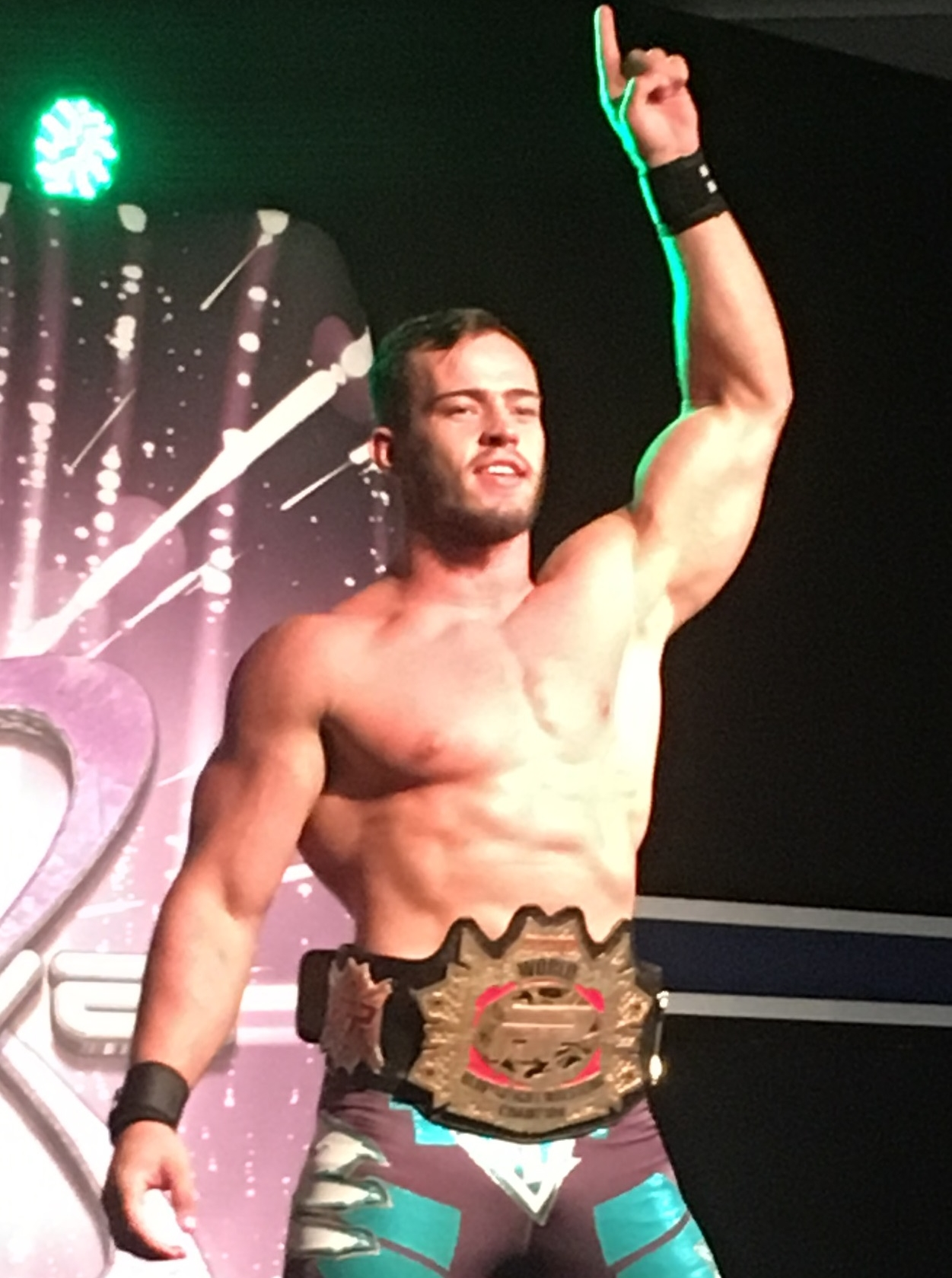
Theory as the FIP World Heavyweight Champion in September 2018

He made his professional wrestling debut for Glory Pro Wrestling (GPW) on April 29, 2016, under the ring name Austin Theory, losing to Mike Cobb in a three-way match also involving Poncho Arp. On May 5, he defeated AR Fox to win the WWA4 Heavyweight Championship, his first professional wrestling championship. On August 12, Theory made his World Wrestling Network (WWN) debut at Full Impact Pro (FIP)'s Heatstroke event.

Theory signed with Evolve In January 2017 and made his debut at Evolve 78 on February 24, defeating Darby Allin. In May, Theory acquired a valet, Priscilla Kelly, who helped him win his matches. On December 10, at Evolve 97, he defeated Fred Yehi to win the FIP World Heavyweight Championship. On February 17, 2018, at Evolve 100, Theory unsuccessfully challenged Zack Sabre Jr. for the Evolve Championship. At Evolve 103 on April 6, Theory defeated Keith Lee to win the WWN Championship, becoming a double champion. At Evolve 106 on June 23, Theory lost the WWN Championship to Joey Janela, but retained the FIP World Heavyweight Championship against Janela and DJ Z in a triple threat match the next day. He lost the title to Anthony Henry on September 30 at FIP's Accelerate event. On October 28, at Evolve 114, he was involved in a six-way ladder match for the vacant WWN Championship, which was won by JD Drake.

At Evolve 117 on December 15, Theory defeated Fabian Aichner and Roderick Strong in a triple threat match to win the Evolve Championship; he fired Kelly as his valet following the match. Throughout 2019, Theory successfully defended the title against the likes of Henry, Kyle O'Reilly, Raul Mendoza, and Leon Ruff. Following a backstage confrontation between Theory and JD Drake, a Winner Takes All match for both the Evolve Championship and WWN Championship was set for Evolve 131 on July 13, which was won by Theory. After the match, he was chokeslammed by Josh Briggs. On August 25, at Evolve 134, he retained the Evolve Championship against Drake and Briggs in a triple threat match. He lost the title to Briggs at Evolve 139 on November 9. Theory subsequently left Evolve after facing Curt Stallion the following night.

=== Mexico (2018–2019) ===
On June 16, 2018, Theory made his debut for Mexican promotion The Crash Lucha Libre, losing to Rey Horus. He wrestled at The Crash VII Aniversario on November 3, losing to Mr. 450 in a four-way match also involving Horus and Shane Strickland. On March 2, 2019, Theory defeated Willie Mack, Bárbaro Cavernario and Sansón to win The Crash Heavyweight Championship. He lost the title on May 4 to Horus in a four-way match also involving Adam Brooks and MJF. On June 14, Theory, representing The Crash, appeared for Consejo Mundial de Lucha Libre (CMLL) on Super Viernes ("Super Fridays"), teaming with Carístico and Volador Jr. to defeat Rush and La Peste Negra ("The Black Plague"; Cavernario and Negro Casas). The next day, he wrestled his last match in Mexico at the time, defeating El Mesías.

=== WWE ===
==== NXT (2019–2021) ====
In February 2018, Theory participated in a WWE and wrestled on April 8, during day 4 of WrestleMania Axxess, where he retained the WWN Championship against Marcel Barthel. On August 10, 2019, Theory was shown on-screen in the crowd at NXT TakeOver: Toronto and his signing was announced five days later, being reported to the WWE Performance Center. He debuted on the December 25 episode of NXT, wrestling Roderick Strong for the NXT North American Championship.

He also appeared on the main roster, wrestling for the WWE Raw Tag Team Championship against The Street Profits (Angelo Dawkins and Montez Ford) with Ángel Garza on Night 2 of WrestleMania 36 on April 5 and the following night on Raw, but lost both matches. He was paired with Seth Rollins and Murphy, but after the June 22 episode of Raw, he stopped appearing with them.

On August 26, Theory returned to NXT, interrupting Bronson Reed, whom he lost to at NXT: Super Tuesday II on September 8. At NXT TakeOver: WarGames on December 6, Theory helped Johnny Gargano win his third NXT North American Championship. He then appeared on the December 9 episode of NXT to reveal he was part of a villainous faction called The Way with Gargano, Gargano's real life wife Candice LeRae, and Indi Hartwell. In January 2021, Theory and Gargano lost to Kushida and Leon Ruff in the first round of the 2021 Dusty Rhodes Tag Team Classic. Following a loss to Kyle O'Reilly on the July 20 episode of NXT, Theory took an absence from NXT television, until he returned on September 14 during the premiere of NXT 2.0, attending the wedding of Hartwell and Dexter Lumis in his final NXT appearance.

==== Mr. Money in the Bank (2021–2022) ====
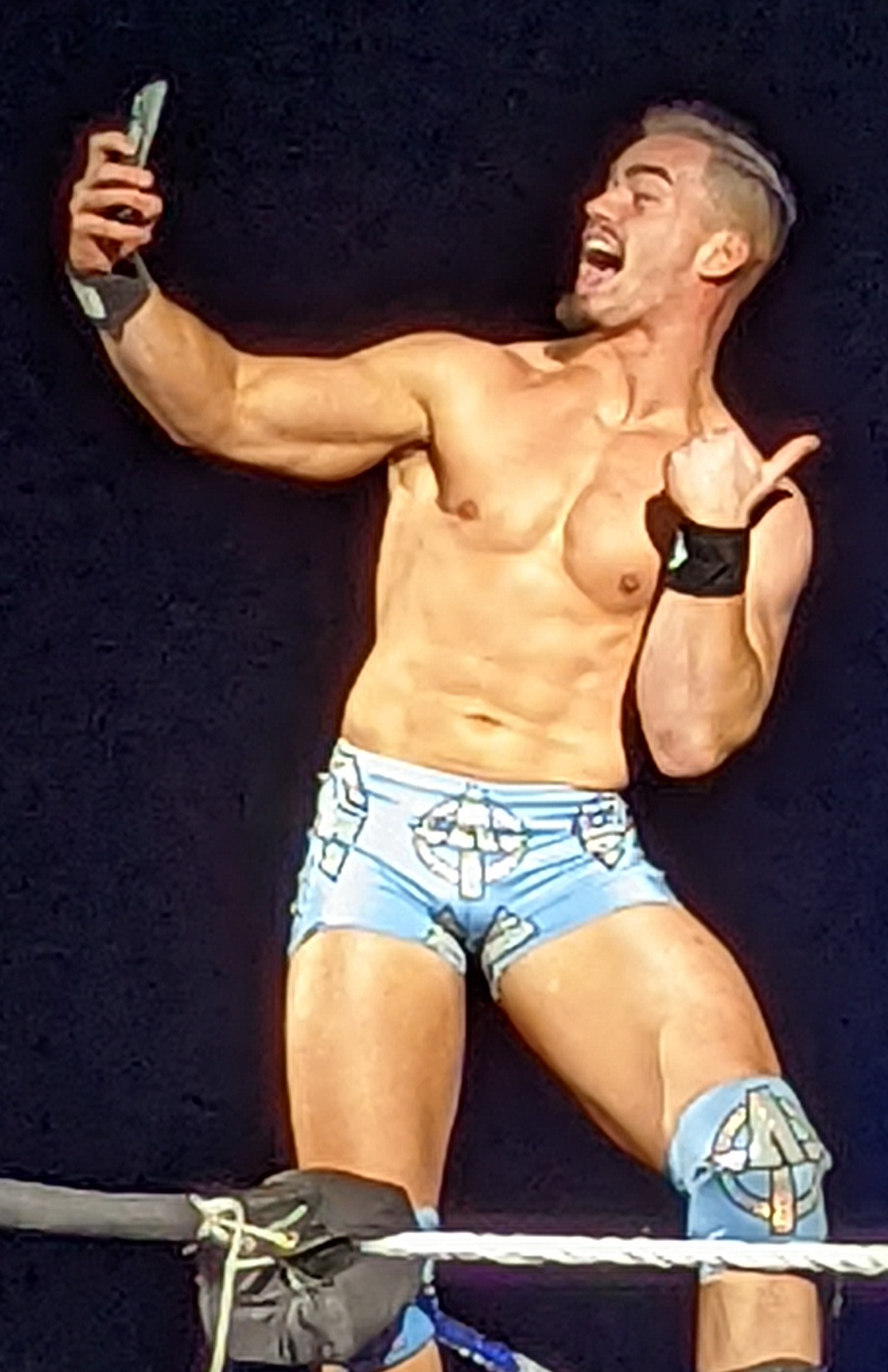
Theory in 2022.

As part of the 2021 Draft, Theory was drafted to the Raw brand. On the October 4 episode of Raw, Theory returned to the brand by attacking Jeff Hardy and defeated him on the next two episodes of Raw. At the same time, he received a new gimmick where he began taking selfies of himself and opponents, even during matches. After Rey Mysterio was injured by Bobby Lashley on the November 15 episode of Raw, he was removed from Team Raw for Survivor Series and replaced by Theory. At the event on November 21, Theory eliminated Sheamus before he was eliminated by Hardy, but his team won the match against Team SmackDown. The next night on Raw, it was revealed that Theory took Cleopatra's Egg from Mr. McMahon, who then rewarded Theory with a WWE Championship match against Big E for showing "intestinal fortitude", which he lost. Theory would be given career advice by McMahon over the following weeks, serving as his protégé. At the Royal Rumble on January 29, 2022, Theory entered his first Royal Rumble match at #3, lasting 22 minutes before he was eliminated by AJ Styles. Two days later on Raw, Theory defeated Kevin Owens to qualify for an Elimination Chamber match for the WWE Championship at the namesake event on February 19, but was the last man pinned by Brock Lesnar after being hit with an F-5 from the top of one of the pods down to the floor. On the February 28 episode of Raw, Theory bribed McMahon into having himself accompany him to his interview with Pat McAfee to no avail. Theory confronted McAfee on the March 4 episode of SmackDown, announcing he would be McAfee's opponent at WrestleMania 38. On Night 2 of WrestleMania on April 3, Theory lost to McAfee, but helped McMahon defeat McAfee in the subsequent fight that ensued, until Stone Cold Steve Austin came out and hit Theory, McMahon, and McAfee with Stone Cold Stunners.

The following night on Raw, Theory and The Usos defeated RK-Bro (Randy Orton and Riddle) and United States Champion Finn Bálor after Theory pinned Bálor, earning the chance to challenge for Bálor's title. In a backstage segment the following week, Theory announced he and Mr. McMahon decided that the name Austin did not suit him anymore, dropping the first name and going by Theory. On the April 18 episode of Raw, Theory defeated Bálor to win the United States Championship for the first time in his career, becoming the second youngest champion in the title's history and the youngest champion under the WWE banner. On the May 9 episode of Raw, Theory lost in his first title defense against Cody Rhodes by disqualification after interference from Rollins, but as championships cannot change hands by disqualification, he retained the title. He successfully defended the title against Mustafa Ali on the May 30 episode of Raw and at Hell in a Cell on June 5.

At Money in the Bank on July 2, Theory lost the United States Championship to Bobby Lashley, ending his reign at 75 days. Later that night, he was added to and won the Men's Money in the Bank ladder match, making him the youngest superstar to win the Money in the Bank contract in WWE history, as well as being the first Money in the Bank winner to lose a title and win the contract on the same night. At SummerSlam on July 30, Theory failed to regain the United States Championship from Lashley. Later that night, he attempted to cash in his Money in the Bank contract during the Undisputed WWE Universal Championship Last Man Standing match between Brock Lesnar and Roman Reigns, but was hit with an F-5 by Lesnar before he could officially cash in. In August, his name was reverted to Austin Theory. At Clash at the Castle on September 3, he again attempted to cash in his Money in the Bank contract during the main event, only to be knocked out by Tyson Fury before he could officially do so. On the November 7 episode of Raw, Theory cashed in his Money in the Bank contract on Rollins for the United States Championship, but was unsuccessful, partially due to interference from Lashley.

==== United States Champion (2022–2023) ====
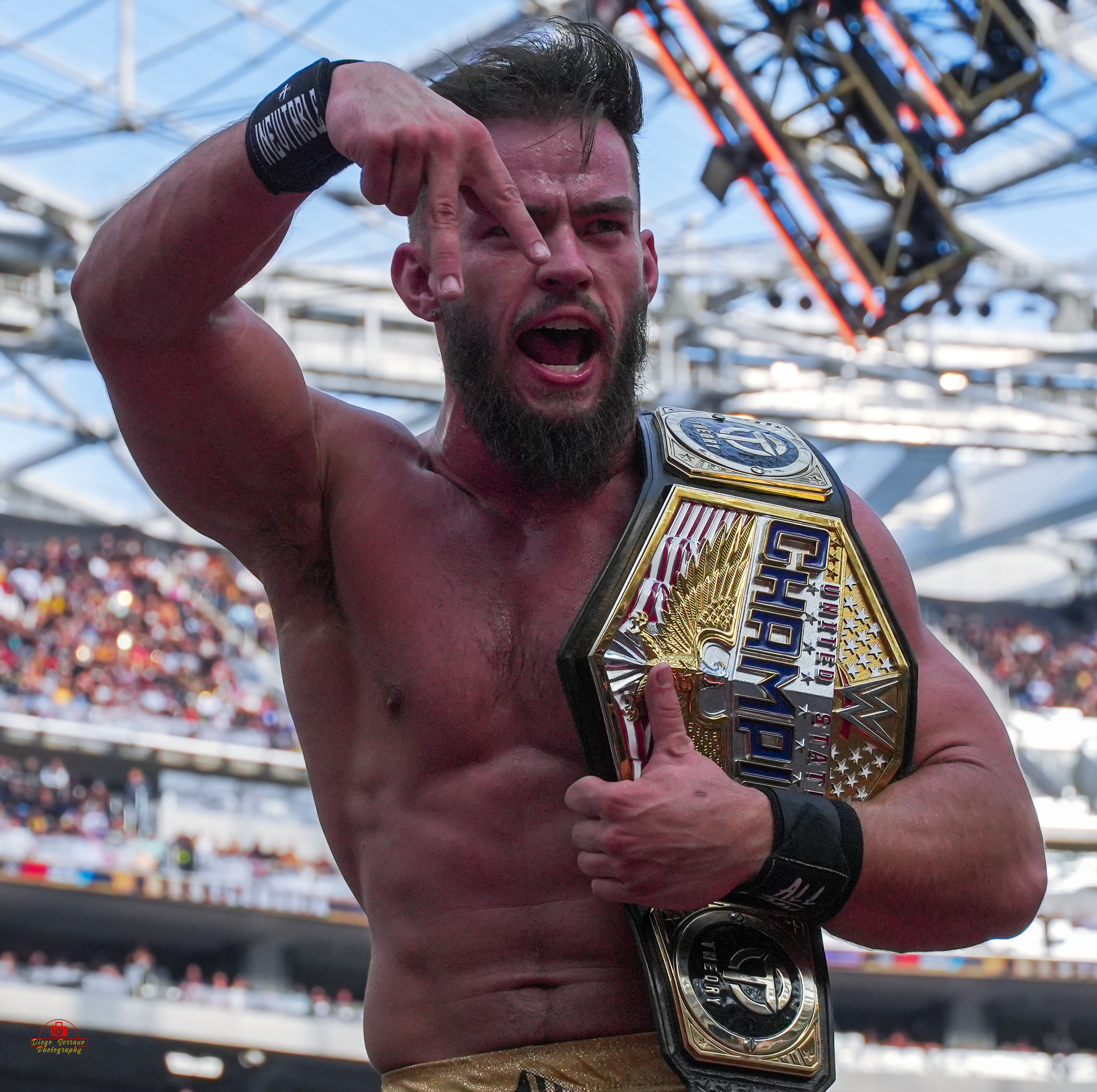
Theory as WWE United States Champion at WrestleMania 39 in 2023.

On November 26, at Survivor Series WarGames, Theory defeated Rollins and Lashley in a triple threat match to win his second United States Championship. He retained the title against Rollins and Lashley on the January 2 and 23 (in a No Disqualification match) episodes of Raw, respectively. At the Royal Rumble on January 28, 2023, Theory entered at #25, but was eliminated by eventual winner Cody Rhodes. At Elimination Chamber on February 18, Theory successfully defended the title against Bronson Reed, Damian Priest, Johnny Gargano, Montez Ford and Rollins in an Elimination Chamber match, marking the first time the title was contested inside the namesake structure. On the following episode of Raw, he retained the title against Edge in an open challenge after interference from Finn Bálor. On the March 6 episode of Raw, Theory challenged the returning John Cena to a match for the title at WrestleMania 39, which Cena accepted. On Night 1 of WrestleMania on April 1, Theory defeated Cena to retain the title.

As part of the 2023 WWE Draft, Theory was drafted to the SmackDown brand. At Backlash on May 6, Theory successfully defended the title against Lashley and Reed in a triple threat match. On the following episode of SmackDown, he lost to Lashley and Sheamus in a triple threat match for the World Heavyweight Championship tournament. On the August 11 episode of SmackDown, he was scheduled to defend the United States Championship against Santos Escobar, who was rendered unable to compete after Theory attacked him backstage. Theory was subsequently defeated by Escobar's Latino World Order stablemate Rey Mysterio in an impromptu title match, ending his second reign at 258 days. The following week, he defeated LA Knight to become the number one contender for the title, but failed to regain it from Mysterio on September 2 at Payback.

==== A-Town Down Under (2023–2025) ====
Later that month, Theory began working with Grayson Waller as a tag team, known as A-Town Down Under. They wrestled in a six-pack ladder match for the Undisputed WWE Tag Team Championship at WrestleMania XL, retrieving the SmackDown Tag Team Championship to become the new champions. On the April 19 episode of SmackDown, the SmackDown Tag Team Championship was renamed as the WWE Tag Team Championship and the team was presented with new title belts by WWE's chief content officer Paul "Triple H" Levesque, and the general manager of SmackDown Nick Aldis. Later that month, they began a feud with #DIY (Johnny Gargano and Tommaso Ciampa), culminating in a title match on the July 5 episode of SmackDown, where Theory and Waller lost the titles to #DIY, ending their reign at 90 days. They failed to regain the titles on the following episode of SmackDown, ending their feud.

Theory and Waller returned to NXT in September, challenging Fraxiom (Nathan Frazer and Axiom) for the NXT Tag Team Championship, but lost their title match on the October 8 episode of NXT. On the January 24, 2025 episode of SmackDown, it was announced that A-Town Down Under was transferred to the Raw brand. On the January 28 episode of NXT, they hosted a special edition of The Grayson Waller Effect with the new NXT Champion Oba Femi to see if Femi was "worth the hype." Femi then offered to defend the NXT Championship in a triple threat match against A-Town Down Under at NXT Vengeance Day on February 15, where Femi retained the title after Waller cost Theory the win. On the July 21 episode of Raw, Waller aligned himself with The New Day, after it was reported Theory suffered a legitimate injury, quietly disbanding A-Town Down Under. The following month, it was reported that Theory had been removed from WWE's internal active roster, leaving his status in the company unknown.

==== The Vision (2025–present) ====
On the December 15, 2025 episode of Raw, Theory was revealed as the masked man who helped The Vision win the men's WarGames match at Survivor Series: WarGames. On the December 29 episode of Raw, Theory was inducted into The Vision by the stable's manager Paul Heyman.

At the Royal Rumble on January 31, 2026, Theory entered the match at #15, eliminating La Parka before being eliminated by a returning LA Knight. On the March 30 episode of Raw, The Vision (Paul and Theory) defeated The Usos (Jey Uso and Jimmy Uso) in a Street Fight to win the World Tag Team Championship. On Night 1 of WrestleMania 42 on April 18, Theory and Paul teamed with IShowSpeed in a losing effort against LA Knight and The Usos ending their feud. After Paul and Theory succuessfully defended their titles against the Street Profits at Saturday Night's Main Event on May 23, it was announced that Paul had suffered a torn tricep and would be out for "months". Due to Paul's injury, Breakker defended the tag titles alongside Theory. The Vision lost the titles on the June 22 episode of Raw to the Street Profits after interference from Joe Hendry and Rollins ending their reign at 84 days, but Theory and Breakker regained them two weeks later on Raw with the assistance from Maxxine Dupri who had been courted by Theory for months. At Crown Jewel on November 7, Theory and Breakker lost the titles to Je'Von Evans and Penta after interference from Oba Femi ending their second reign at 124 days.

== Other media ==
White appeared as an extra in the 2016 comedy film Neighbors 2: Sorority Rising and the 2017 Marvel Studios film Spider-Man: Homecoming. He also appeared in the 2016 Adult Swim series Million Dollar Extreme Presents: World Peace, created by comedy group Million Dollar Extreme.

As Austin Theory, White made his video game debut as a playable character in WWE 2K22, and has since appeared in WWE 2K23, WWE 2K24, WWE 2K25, and WWE 2K26.

== Personal life ==
White adheres to a straight edge lifestyle, in part due to his father's alcoholism. He has two younger half brothers from his mother's second marriage. He is of Latin American descent through his mother.

== Championships and accomplishments ==
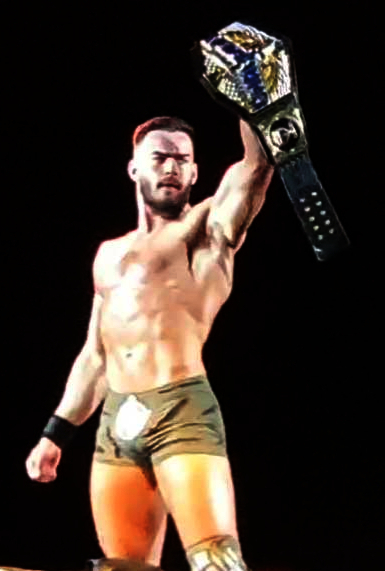
In WWE, Theory is a two-time WWE United States Champion...

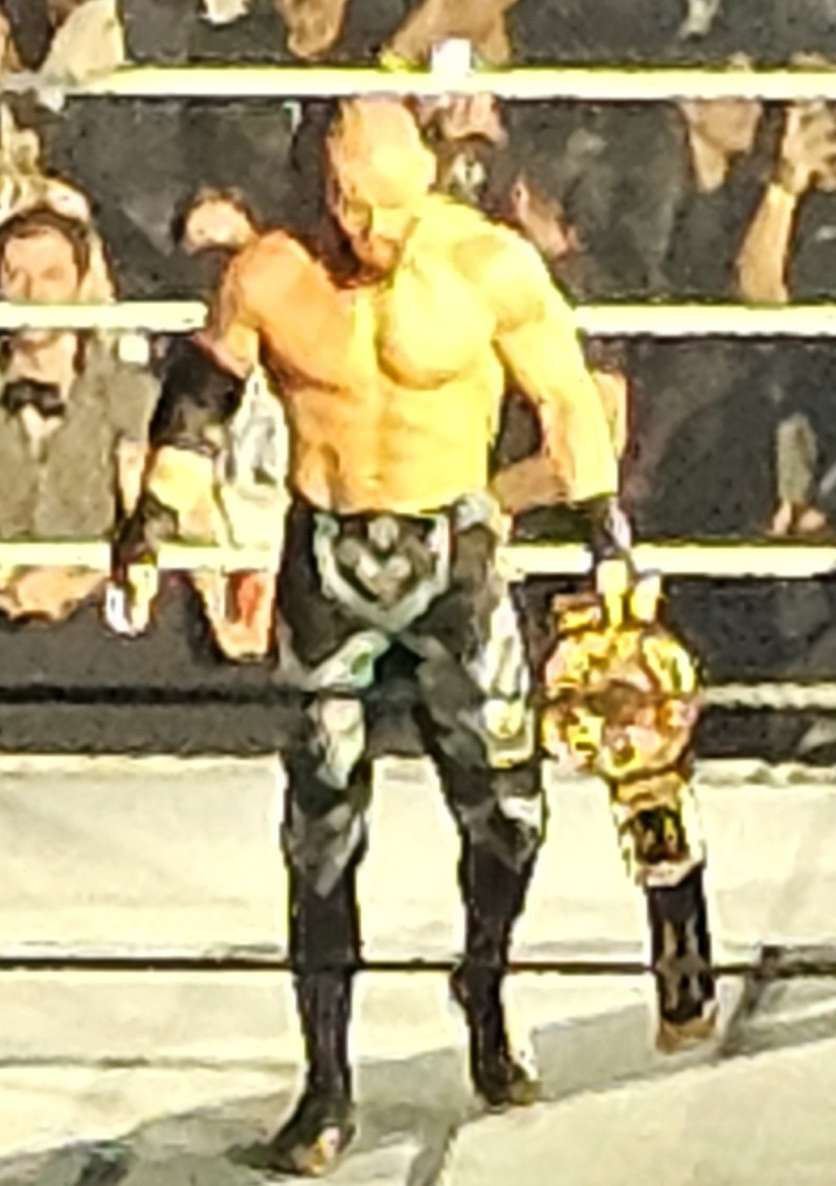
...and a two-time World Tag Team Champion

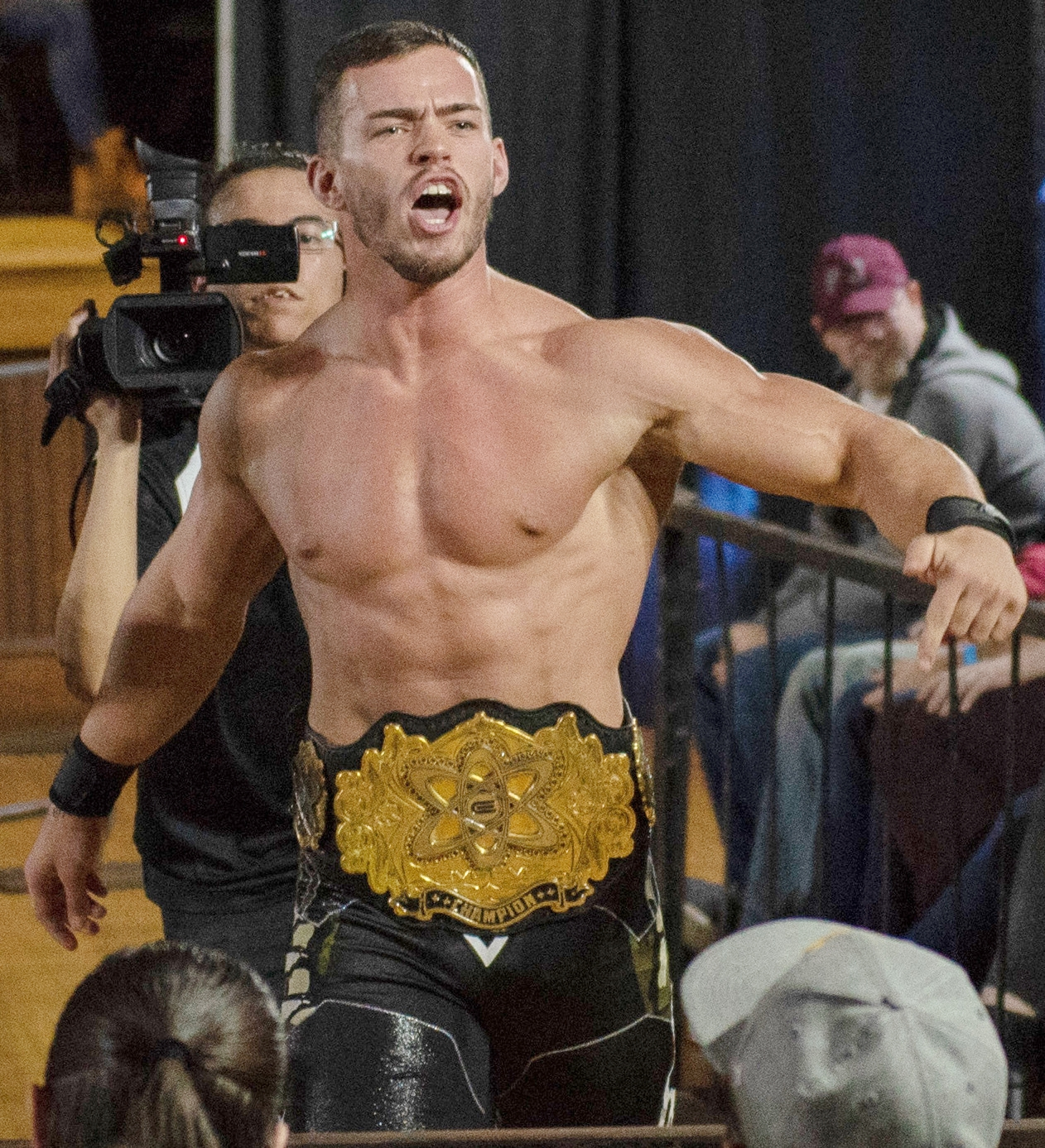
On the independent circuit, Theory is a former one-time Evolve Champion...

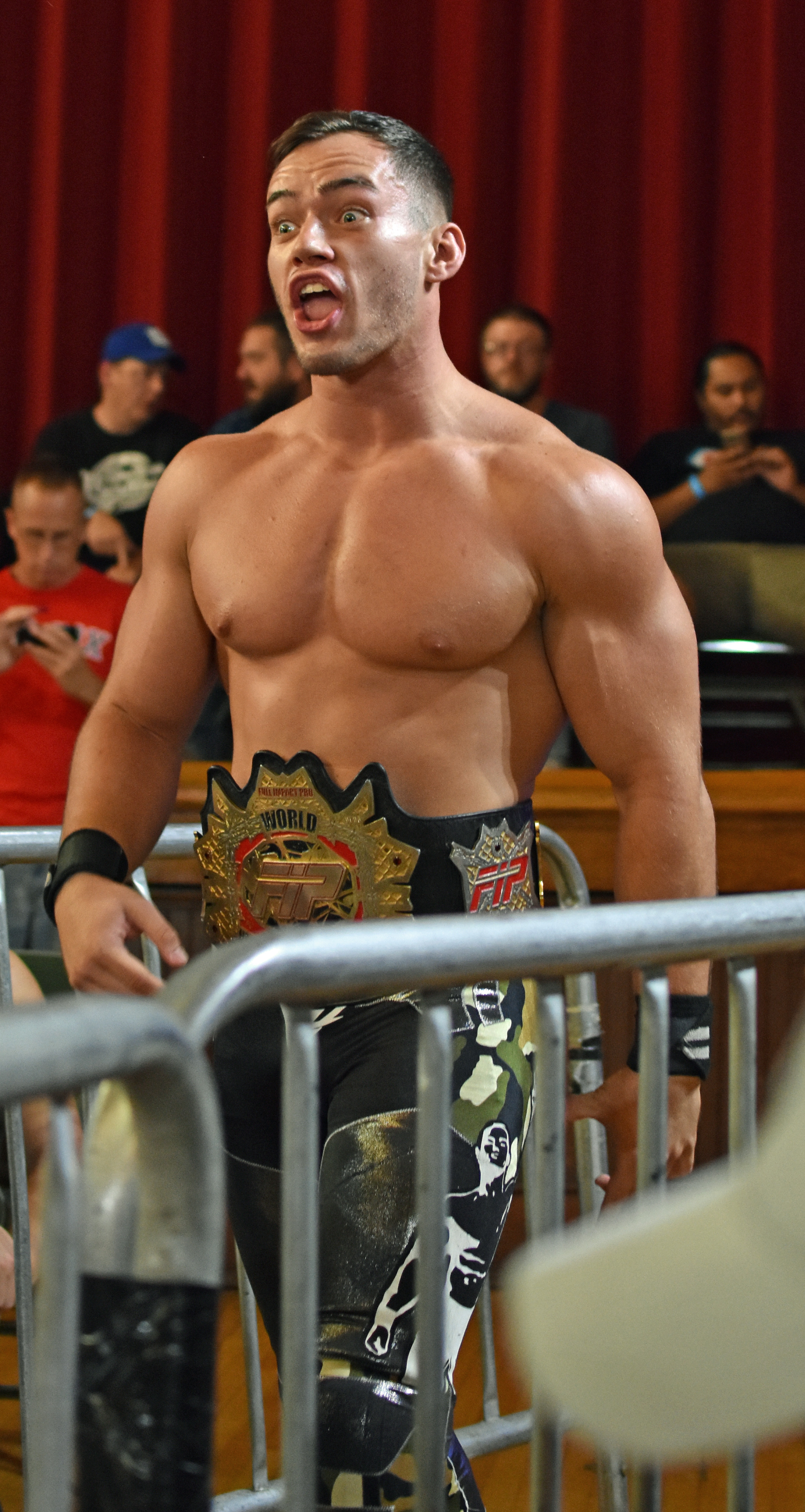
...and a former one-time FIP World Heavyweight Champion.

=== Bodybuilding ===
- National Physique Committee
  - NPC Georgia Teen, Men's bodybuilding championship winner (1 time)

=== Professional wrestling ===
- The Crash Lucha Libre
  - The Crash Heavyweight Championship (1 time)
- ESPN
  - Ranked No. 3 of the 30 best Pro Wrestlers Under 30 in 2023
- Evolve
  - Evolve Championship (1 time)
- Full Impact Pro
  - FIP World Heavyweight Championship (1 time)
- Fire Star Pro Wrestling
  - FSPW Heavyweight Championship (2 times)
  - FSPW Heavyweight Title Tournament (2017)
- Mucha Lucha Atlanta
  - MLA Global Championship (1 time)
- Peachstate Wrestling Alliance
  - PWA Heritage Championship (1 time)
- Pro Wrestling Illustrated
  - Ranked No. 45 of the top 500 singles wrestlers in the PWI 500 in 2023
- World Wrestling Network
  - WWN Championship (2 times, final)
- WWA4
  - WWA4 Heavyweight Championship (1 time)
- WWE
  - WWE United States Championship (2 times)
  - World Tag Team Championship (2 times) – with Logan Paul/Bron Breakker (1) (Note: Theory originally won the title with Paul, but after Paul got injured, he was replaced by stablemate Breakker.), and Bron Breakker (1)
  - WWE Tag Team Championship (Note: Theory and Waller won the WWE Tag Team Championship as the WWE SmackDown Tag Team Championship. The title was renamed on April 19, 2024 during their reign.) (1 time) – with Grayson Waller
  - Men's Money in the Bank (2022)
  - WrestleMania XL Six-Pack Ladder Match SmackDown Qualifier Tournament (2024) – with Grayson Waller
  - NXT Year-End Award (1 time)
    - Future Star of NXT (2020)
- Xtreme Wrestling Alliance
  - XWA Heavyweight Championship (1 time)
