= Theorema =

- Theorema eumenia in Seitz

Scientific classification
- Kingdom: Animalia
- Phylum: Arthropoda
- Clade: Pancrustacea
- Class: Insecta
- Order: Lepidoptera
- Family: Lycaenidae
- Genus: Theorema; Hewitson, 1865

Butterfly genus in family Lycaenidae

Theorema is a genus of butterflies in the family Lycaenidae. The members of this genus are found in the Neotropical realm.

== Species ==
- Theorema eumenia Hewitson, 1865 Colombia, Costa Rica, Panama
- Theorema sapho Staudinger, 1888 Colombia
- Theorema dysmenia Draudt, 1919 Colombia
