= Thiéry, Burkina Faso =

Thiéry
- Interactive map of Thiéry
- Coordinates: 12°59′42″N 0°12′41″W
- Country: Burkina Faso
- Region: Est Region
- Province: Gnagna Province
- Department: Bogandé Department

Population (2019)
  - Total: 11,556

Thiéry is a town in the Bogandé Department of Gnagna Province in eastern Burkina Faso.

Population
Year	Pop.	±%
1985	4,180	—
2006	6,562	+57.0%
2019	11,556	+76.1%
