= Mathematical theory (disambiguation) =

The term mathematical theory may refer to:

- Theory (mathematical logic), a collection of sentences in a formal language.
- Mathematical theory, a branch of mathematics

== See also ==
- Theory
