= Awesome Truth =

American professional wrestling tag team

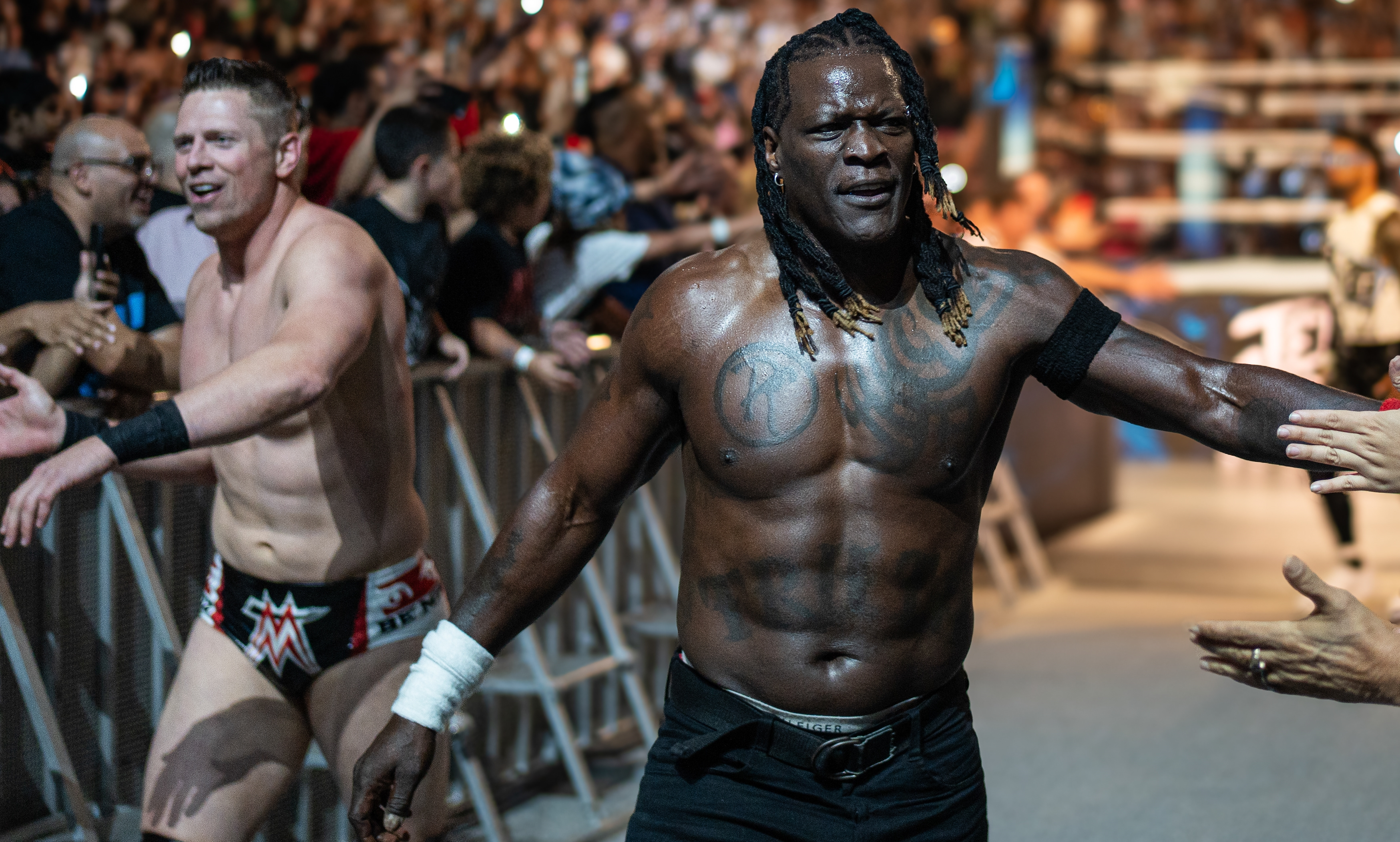
- The Miz and R-Truth in March 2024

Tag team
- Members: The Miz; R-Truth
- Name(s): Awesome Truth; The Miz and R-Truth
- Billed heights: The Miz: 6 ft 2 in (1.88 m); R-Truth: 6 ft 2 in (1.88 m)
- Combined billed weight: 441 lb (200 kg)
- Debut: August 22, 2011
- Disbanded: September 30, 2024
- Years active: 2011; 2013; 2019; 2024

Awesome Truth was a professional wrestling tag team in WWE consisting of The Miz and R-Truth. They are one-time World Tag Team Champions. Their initial run started in 2011 with both wrestlers performing as villains, before reuniting as heroic characters in 2024.

== History ==
=== Formation, dissolution and feud (2011–2012) ===
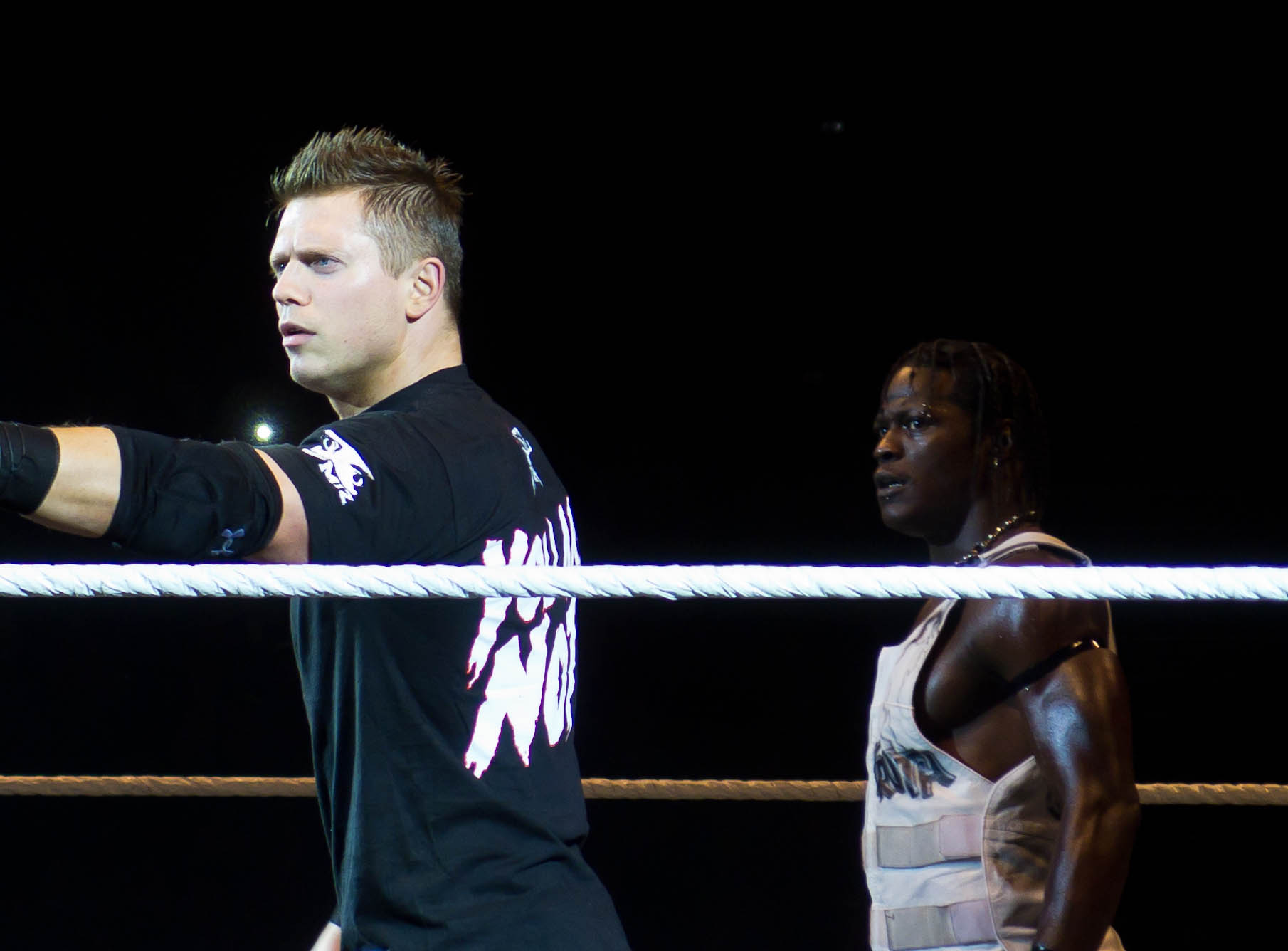
Awesome Truth in 2011

On the August 22, 2011 episode of Raw, The Miz and R-Truth attacked Santino Marella before his match and then proceeded to cut a promo bashing Triple H about not using them properly. The next week, R-Truth interfered in The Miz's match and both of them attacked CM Punk. On the September 5 episode of Raw, The Miz and R-Truth, now collectively known as "Awesome Truth", challenged Air Boom (Evan Bourne and Kofi Kingston) to a match for the WWE Tag Team Championship at Night of Champions, but were disqualified after The Miz assaulted a referee during the match. The Miz and R-Truth were subsequently fired by Triple H the following night on Raw SuperShow.

At Hell in a Cell, Awesome Truth attacked Alberto Del Rio, CM Punk, John Cena and referees after the WWE Championship match ended. After this, the entire WWE roster came out to find a way into the Hell in a Cell structure before police officers were able to get the door open and arrest them. On the October 10 episode of Raw SuperShow, Awesome Truth were reinstated by John Laurinaitis. At Vengeance, Awesome Truth defeated Punk and Triple H in a tag team match, due to interference from Kevin Nash. Later that same night, they attacked Cena during his WWE Championship match with Del Rio, costing him the match and sparking a feud with Cena in the process. On the October 24 episode of Raw SuperShow, Awesome Truth attacked Zack Ryder backstage just before Ryder would team up with Cena. As a result, Laurinaitis announced a tag team match for Survivor Series, but allowed Cena to choose his own partner, who ultimately chose The Rock. At Survivor Series on November 20, Awesome Truth were defeated by Cena and The Rock in the main event. The following night on Raw SuperShow, Cena instigated an argument between R-Truth and The Miz, which ultimately led to the team's dissolution as The Miz attacked R-Truth with a Skull Crushing Finale onto the stage. Following the event, Killings was suspended for 30 days for violating the Wellness Policy.

On the December 26 episode of Raw SuperShow, R-Truth returned to attack The Miz after The Miz lost to Cena via countout, turning R-Truth face in the process. This was followed by back-and-forth assaults on the two throughout January. The Miz and R-Truth crossed paths in the 2012 Royal Rumble match, with The Miz entering at #1 and R-Truth entering at #3, but R-Truth was eliminated by The Miz, who would go to last 45:39 before being eliminated by Big Show. Both The Miz and R-Truth wrestled for the WWE Championship against CM Punk, Chris Jericho, Dolph Ziggler, and Kofi Kingston at Elimination Chamber, but neither were able to win. The two were subsequently in opposite teams at WrestleMania XXVIII, with R-Truth joining Theodore Long's team while The Miz joined Laurinaitis' team in a 12-man tag team match to determine the General Manager of both Raw and SmackDown, in which Laurinaitis' team would win when The Miz pinned Zack Ryder.

=== One-off reunions (2013–2019) ===
On September 21, 2013, The Miz and R-Truth faced The Shield (Roman Reigns and Seth Rollins) for the WWE Tag Team Championship on a house show. They won the match by disqualification but did not win the championships since titles do not change hands via disqualification.

In early 2019, The Miz was involved in a feud with Shane McMahon and the latter's allies Drew McIntyre and Elias. The Miz and R-Truth teamed together on the June 18, 2019 episode of SmackDown Live in a losing effort against McIntyre and Elias.

=== Reunion as fan favorites and second dissolution (2024) ===
In November 2023, R-Truth became involved in a storyline with The Judgment Day, a stable consisting of Damian Priest, Rhea Ripley, Finn Bálor, "Dirty" Dominik Mysterio, and JD McDonagh, in which R-Truth thought himself to be a member of the stable. This ended when the entire stable attacked R-Truth in the ring on the December 11 episode of Raw. At Raw: Day 1 on January 1, 2024, The Miz hosted an in-ring Miz TV segment with The Judgment Day, but they refused to appear. R-Truth appeared instead and spoke on behalf of the group. Subsequently, the group confronted R-Truth over his delusion before The Miz defended R-Truth. The Miz and R-Truth subsequently defeated Mysterio and McDonagh in their first match as a team since 2019. Over the next few weeks, The Miz would continue to try and convince R-Truth that he was not a member of The Judgment Day, despite R-Truth's protests. At Royal Rumble on January 27, both The Miz and R-Truth participated in the men's Royal Rumble match, where they briefly teamed up and performed their signature Awesome Truth dance, before they were eliminated by Gunther and Priest, respectively. On the following episode of Raw, R-Truth was attacked by The Judgment Day after they officially declared that he was not a member of the group. The Miz tried to save him but both were beaten down by the stable.

On the March 18 episode of Raw, The Miz and R-Truth defeated Indus Sher (Veer and Sanga) to qualify for the six-pack ladder match for the Undisputed WWE Tag Team Championship at WrestleMania XL. At Night 1 of WrestleMania XL on April 6, R-Truth climbed the ladder and retrieved the Raw Tag Team Championship, giving Truth his first WrestleMania win and the team's first title win. On the April 15 episode of Raw, the Raw Tag Team Championship was renamed to the World Tag Team Championship and the team was presented with new championship belts by WWE chief content officer Paul "Triple H" Levesque and the general manager of Raw Adam Pearce. On the April 22 episode of Raw, The Miz and R-Truth successfully defended their titles in their first title defense against #DIY (Johnny Gargano and Tommaso Ciampa). On the June 24 episode of Raw, they lost the titles to Bálor and McDonagh after interference from Carlito, Mysterio, and Women's World Champion Liv Morgan, ending their reign at 79 days.

On the July 29 episode of Raw, The Miz was announced as the official host of SummerSlam in his hometown of Cleveland, Ohio. On the September 30 episode of Raw, following repeated instances of Truth signing the two of them up for matches without Miz's knowledge, The Miz attacked Truth and walked out on him causing the team to lose against the Authors of Pain, ending the team once again in the process. On June 1, Truth told via social media that WWE had chosen to not renew his contract.

At Money In The Bank 2025, R-Truth returned to WWE under his real name, Ron Killings.

== Championships and accomplishments ==
- WWE
  - World Tag Team Championship (1 time)
