= Thiery (surname) =

Thiery is a surname. Notable people with the name include:

- Benjamin Thiéry (born 1984) French rugby union player
- Cyrille Thièry (born 1990), Swiss cyclist
- Henri Thiéry (1829–1872), French journalist and playwright
- Herman Thiery (1912–1978), Flemish author

== See also ==
- Alima Boumediene-Thiery (born 1956), French politician
- Thiry, surname
- Thierry, given name and surname
