= Thierry =

- Pronunciation: French: [tjɛʁi]
- Gender: masculine
- Language: French

Origin
- Meaning: Power is mighty or the ruler of the people or God's gift

Thierry is a French male given name, derived from the Germanic "Theodoric". It is the cognate of German "Dietrich" and "Dieter", Italian and Spanish Teodorico, English Derek and Derrick, and of various forms in other European languages. It is also a surname. Notable people with the name include:

== Given name ==
- Theodoric of Mont d'Hor (died 533), also known as Saint Thierry (or Theudric, Thierri)
- Theodoric of Freiberg (c. 1250–c. 1310), also known as Thierry, early Dominican
- Thierry of Chartres (died before 1155), French philosopher
- Theodoric I, Duke of Upper Lorraine (ruled 978–1027)
- Theodoric II, Duke of Lorraine (ruled 1070–1115)
- Theuderic II (587–613), king of Burgundy and Austrasia
- Thierry IV (8th century), Frankish nobleman
- Thierry, Count of Flanders (c. 1099–1168), also known as Derrick or Thierry of Alsace
- Thierry Ambrose (born 1997), French footballer
- Thierry Ardisson (1949–2025), French television producer and host
- Thierry Baudet (born 1983), Dutch politician and author
- Thierry Boutsen (born 1957), Belgian Formula One race car driver
- Thierry Breton (born 1955), European Commissioner for Internal Market, French businessman, former Minister of the Economy
- Thierry Brusseau, French track and field athlete
- Thierry Claveyrolat (1959–1999), French road bicycle racer
- Thierry Cornillet (born 1951), French politician
- Thierry Delubac (born 1963), French racing driver
- Thierry Dusautoir (born 1981), French rugby player
- Thierry Fischer (born 1957), Swiss conductor and flautist
- Thierry Gale (born 2002), Barbadian footballer
- Thierry Garnier, businessman, CEO of Kingfisher
- Thierry Guetta (born 1966), French street artist
- Thierry Gueorgiou (born 1979), French orienteer
- Thierry Henry (born 1977), French footballer
- Thierry Hermès (1801–1878), founder of fashion house Hermès
- Thierry Jacob (1965–2024), French professional boxer
- Thierry Jonquet (1954–2009), French writer
- Thierry Lamberton (born 1966), French speed skater
- Thierry Latty-Fairweather (born 2002), English footballer
- Thierry Lhermitte (born 1952), French actor
- Thierry Lincou (born 1976), French squash player
- Thierry Mariani (born 1958), French politician
- Thierry Maulnier (1909–1988), French journalist, essayist, dramatist and critic
- Thierry Mugler (1948–2022), French fashion designer
- Thierry Meyssan (born 1957), French journalist
- Thierry Morel, French art historian and curator
- Thierry Mutin, French singer
- Thierry Neuville (born 1988), Belgian rally driver
- Thierry Paulin (1963–1989), French serial killer
- Thierry Pastor, (born 1960) French singer
- Thierry Pelenga, Anti-balaka leader from Haute-Kotto prefecture in the Central African Republic and a war criminal
- Thierry Perez (born 1966), French politician
- Thierry Roussel (born 1953), fourth husband of Christina Onassis
- Thierry Ruinart (1657–1709), French Benedictine monk and scholar
- Thierry Sabine (1949–1986), French race driver, and founder and main organizer of the Dakar Rally
- Thierry St-Cyr (born 1977), Canadian politician
- Thierry Steimetz (1983–2026), French footballer
- Thierry Tesson (born 1957), French politician
- Thierry Vermeulen (born 2002), Dutch racing driver
- Thierry Warmoes (born 1964), Belgian politician
- Thierry Zéno (1950–2017), Belgian author and filmmaker
- Thierry Zéphir (born 19??), French author and curator

== Surname ==
- Augustin Thierry (1795–1856), French historian
- Amédée Thierry (1797–1873), French historian, brother of the above
- John Thierry (born 1971), American former football player
- Mélanie Thierry (born 1981), French actress
- Nicolas Thierry (born 1975), French politician
- Taylor Thierry (born 2002), American basketball player

== Fictional characters ==
- Thierry Vanchure, a recurring character in The Originals TV series

== See also ==
- Thiery (surname)
- Thiry, a surname
- Theary Seng (born 1971), Cambodian-American activist imprisoned in Cambodia
