= Chief content officer =

Corporate executive responsible for digital media creation and publication

A chief content officer (CCO) is a corporate executive responsible for the brand development through content creation and multi-channel publication of the organization's content (text, video, audio, animation, etc.). The CCO oversees the content creation team and make sure that all content initiatives are done the way it is envisioned.

The chief content officer is usually an executive role or senior vice president position, typically reporting to the chief executive officer or the president of the organization.

In a broadcasting organisation, the CCO is generally the highest ranking creative member of the organization. However, the chief content officer position is also common in many other industries, ranging from insurance to video production based on a LinkedIn study.

== Responsibilities ==
Like all other chief officers, the chief content officer is responsible for supervision, coordination, planning and operation in their own field of responsibility. The CCO may also lead a company's branding and marketing efforts (as it relates to content), if these areas are not overseen by a chief marketing officer.

The chief content officer is responsible for hiring and leading a team of content marketers and writers. The CCO create an overall content strategy, develop editorial plans and calendars to meet weekly and monthly goals, and is willing to make changes if necessary.

Writers and content marketers will report to the CCO with status updates and present their content for edits and revisions.

== Evolution and strategic role ==
The chief content officer (CCO) role has grown in prominence as organizations place increased strategic emphasis on content as a driver of audience engagement, brand visibility, and customer experience across digital and traditional platforms. Research from executive advisory firms notes that the proliferation of content channels and the need for coordinated multi-channel communication have led many organizations to elevate content strategy to a senior executive level, with content leadership becoming part of overall business planning rather than a subfunction of marketing or publishing.

In non-media companies, a growing number of organizations have established a CCO position to provide cohesive direction for content strategy that extends beyond traditional editorial activities. These leaders often work with senior management to integrate content into broader brand and business objectives, reflecting the role’s evolution from purely creative oversight to strategic content governance and enterprise-wide influence.
