= Tudor (name) =

Tudor is a surname and given name of Welsh origin, and also a separate name of Romanian origin. The Welsh name comes from the Brythonic Tudur, itself a derivation of Toutorīx which was conflated with Tewdwr or Tewdr. It is related to the name Theodore. While Tudor (and Tudora in its female form) is also a first name of Romanian origin, also related to Teodor.

The English royal dynasty, the House of Tudor (descended from the Welsh Tudors of Penmynydd) including prominent members:

- Tudur ap Goronwy, administrator of the Penmynydd family, Owen Tudor's grandfather and the eponymous ancestor of the House of Tudor
- Owen Tudor (Welsh: Owain ap Maredudd ap Tewdwr), lover or possibly second husband of Catherine of Valois, and grandfather of King Henry VII
- Edmund Tudor, 1st Earl of Richmond, son of Owen Tudor and Catherine of Valois, father of King Henry VII
- Jasper Tudor, 1st Duke of Bedford, second son of Owen and Catherine and brother of Edmund, uncle of King Henry VII
- Arthur Tudor, eldest son of King Henry VII (predeceased his father)
- Margaret Tudor, Queen Consort of Scotland, eldest daughter of King Henry VII. Mother of James V of Scots which gave rise to the House of Stuart in England.
- Mary Tudor, Queen of France, latterly Mary Brandon, Duchess of Suffolk, second daughter of King Henry VII
- Edmund Tudor, Duke of Somerset, third son of King Henry VII

Tudor, as a surname, may also refer to:

- Adrian Tudor (born 1985), a Romanian basketball player
- Andrei Tudor, a Romanian poet and musicologist
- Alex Tudor, an English cricketer
- Alexandru Tudor, a Romanian football referee
- Antony Tudor, a British choreographer
- Bill Tudor (1921–1986), American businessman
- Corneliu Vadim Tudor, a Romanian politician
- Cristian Tudor, a Romanian footballer
- David Tudor, an American pianist
- Edward Tudor-Pole, a British singer
- Fran Tudor, a Croatian football player
- Frank Tudor, an Australian politician
- Frederic Tudor (1783–1864), an American entrepreneur known as Boston's "Ice King"
- Frederick Tudor, British admiral
- Guy Tudor (1934–2026), an American ornithologist, naturalist and artist
- Henri Tudor (1859–1928), a Luxembourgian industrialist and inventor
- Henry Hugh Tudor, a British soldier, later police chief in Ireland and then Palestine
- Henry Morton Tudor Tudor, British admiral
- Igor Tudor, a Croatian football player
- Joel Tudor, an American longboard surfer
- John Tudor (footballer), an English football player
- John Tudor (baseball), an American baseball player
- Larissa Tudor (d. 1926), a British woman who appeared strikingly similar to Grand Duchess Tatiana Nikolaevna of Russia but never actually claimed to be the former grand duchess. Many people who knew Larissa strongly suspected that she was the former grand duchess of Russia.
- Luka Tudor (b. 1969), a Chilean football player
- Richard Tudor (born 1948), English cricketer
- Robert Lee Tudor (1874–1949), American politician
- Sandu Tudor, a Romanian poet and monk
- Shane Tudor (b. 1982), an English football player
- Stepan Tudor (1892–1941), Ukrainian writer
- Tasha Tudor (1915–2008), an American illustrator and author of children's books
- William Tudor (1750–1819), an Attorney-at-Law who served as Representative of Boston in the Massachusetts General Court, State Senator, Secretary of the Commonwealth, and was a founder of the Massachusetts Historical Society
- William Tudor (1769-1845), a British Army surgeon and politician
- William Tudor (1779–1830), a leading literary figure in Boston and cofounder of the North American Review and the Boston Athenaeum
- Will Tudor (b. 1987), an English actor

As a given name:

- Tudor Arghezi (1880–1967), Romanian poet and writer, major Romanian literary figure
- Tudor Cataraga (1956–2010), Moldovan sculptor
- Tudor Ciortea (1903–1982), Romanian composer
- Tudor Dixon (born 1977), American politician
- Tudor Evans, British politician
- Tudor Ganea (1922–1971), Romanian mathematician
- Tudor Gates (1930–2007), English screenwriter and trade unionist
- Tudor Gheorghe (born 1945), Romanian musician
- Tudor Gunasekara (1935–2021), Sri Lankan politician and diplomat
- Paul Tudor Jones (born 1954), founder of the Tudor Investment Corporation hedge fund
- Watkin Tudor Jones (born 1974), South-african rapper
- Tudor Măinescu (1892–1977), Romanian poet and writer
- Tudor Mușatescu (1903–1970), Romanian playwright
- Tudor Ratiu (born 1950), Romanian-American mathematician
- Tudor Tănăsescu (1901–1961), Romanian engineer
- Tudor Vladimirescu (c.1780–1821), Romanian revolutionary hero
- Tudor Zbârnea (born 1955), Moldovan painter

== See also ==
- Tabitha Tuders (born 1990), American teenager girl who has been missing since 2003
- Tudor (disambiguation)
- Todor
