= Theodoric =

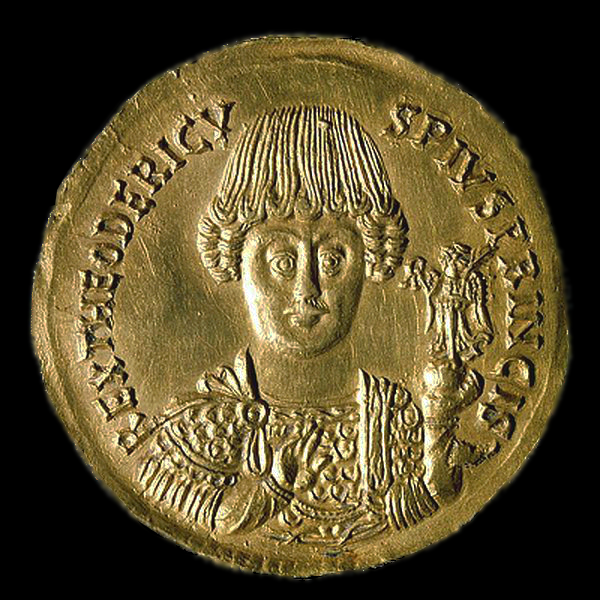
- Theodoric the Great
- Gender: Male
- Language: Germanic

Origin
- Meaning: þeudo "people" and rīks "ruler"

Other names
- Alternative spelling: Theoderic, Theudoric, Theuderic, Theuderich, Þjóðríkr, Tjodrik, Dietrich, Ditrik, Dedrick, Diederik
- Derived: Dieter, Derek, Derrick, Dirk, Teodorico, Thierry, Terry, Tietje, Diede, Tudur
- See also: Theodore (given name)

Theodoric is a Germanic dithematic given name. First attested as a Gothic name in the 5th century, it became widespread in the Germanic-speaking world, not least due to its most famous bearer, Theodoric the Great, king of the Ostrogoths.

== Overview ==
The name was Latinized as Theodoricus or Theodericus, originally from a Common Germanic form *Þeudarīks ("people-ruler") from *þeudō ("people") and *rīks, which would have resulted in a Gothic *𐌸𐌹𐌿𐌳𐌰𐍂𐌴𐌹𐌺𐍃 (*þiudareiks). Anglicized spellings of the name during Late Antiquity and the Early Middle Ages include Theodoric, Theoderic, Theudoric, Theuderic. Gregory of Tours Latinized the name as Theodorus, in origin the unrelated Greek name Theodore (Θεόδωρος, meaning "God's gift").

As the name survived throughout the Middle Ages, it transformed into a multitude of forms in the languages of Western Europe. These include the High German form Dietrich, abbreviated Dieter, the Low German and Dutch form Diederik, or Dierik, abbreviated Dirck, Dirk, Dik or Diede, the Norwegian Tjodrik, Diderik and Didrik. Of the Romance languages, French has Thierry and Italian, Portuguese and Spanish has Teodorico.

The English forms Derek, Derrick and Terry have been re-introduced from the continent, from Low German, Dutch and French sources. The derived Welsh form is Tewdrig; however, there also exists the related Welsh name Tudur (from Proto-Celtic *Toutorīxs, exactly cognate with Proto-Germanic *Þeudarīks) which is the origin of the name of the English Tudor dynasty.

== Late antiquity to early Middle Ages ==
The earliest record of the name is in a Roman-era (3rd century) inscription, discovered in 1784 in Wiesbaden (at the time known as Aquae Mattiacorum in Germania Superior), edited in Codex inscriptionum romanarum Danubii et Rheni as no. 684: IN. H. D. D. APOLLINI. TOVTIORIGI, interpreted as In honorem domus divinae, Apolloni toutiorigi. This has given rise to a supposed "Apollo Teutorix" in 19th-century literature. John Rhŷs (1892) opined that "the interest attached to the word Toutiorix is out of all proportion to its single occurrence". The existence of a genuinely Celtic name Teutorix or Tout(i)orix is uncertain, though Welsh Tudur, Old Welsh Tutir presupposes a precise cognate of Toutorix at least in ancient British Celtic. Rhŷs surmises that the "historical Teuton" (viz. Theoderic the Great) bore a name of the Gaulish Apollo as adopted into early Germanic religion.

The first known bearer of the name was Theodoric I, son of Alaric I, king of the Visigoths (d. 451). The Gothic form of the name would have been Þiudareiks, which was Latinized as Theodericus. The notability of the name is due to Theoderic the Great, son of Theodemir, king of the Ostrogoths (454–526), who became a legendary figure of the Germanic Heroic Age as Dietrich von Bern.

After the end of late antiquity, during the 6th to 8th centuries there were also several kings of the Franks called Theodoric (or Theuderic). Finally, there was an early Anglo-Saxon king of Bernicia called Theodric (also spelled Deoric, Old English Þēodrīc).

- Theodoric I (died 451), king of the Visigoths
- Theodoric II (died 466), king of the Visigoths
- Theoderic the Great (454–526), ruler of the Ostrogoths, Italy, and the Visigoths
- Theodoric Strabo (died 481), leader of the Thracian Goths
- Theuderic I (died c. 534), Frankish king
- Theuderic II (587–613), Frankish king
- Theuderic III (died 691), king of the Franks
- Theuderic IV (died 737), king of the Franks
- Theodric of Bernicia, 6th-century Anglo-Saxon king
- Theodoric of Mont d'Hor (died 533), disciple of Saint Remigius who became abbot of Saint-Thierry Abbey near Reims, France
- Saint Tewdrig (alternatively Tewdric or Theodoric) (c. 580 – c. 630), Welsh king of Gwent and Glywysing, who was martyred fighting the Saxons
- Theoderic, Duke of Saxony (8th century)
- Thierry IV (8th century)
- Theodoric, Bishop of Minden (died 880)
- Theodoric I, Bishop of Paderborn (died 916)
- Dirk I, Count of Holland (c. 870 – 928/944), in Latin Theodoric
- Dirk II, Count of Holland (920/930–988)
- Theodoric I of Wettin (920–976), Saxon nobleman
- Theodoric I, Duke of Upper Lorraine (965–1026)

== High and late Middle Ages ==
While the Anglo-Saxon name Theodric (Deoric, old form: th = d) became extinct in the Middle English period, it was adopted in Welsh as Tewdrig. The name remains popular in medieval German as Dietrich, and is adopted into French as Thierry. It is rendered in Medieval Latin as Theodoricus or as Theodericus. The Middle High German legend of Dietrich von Bern is based on the historical Theodoric, king of the Ostrogoths. The German Dietrich von Bern is reflected as Þiðrekr af Bern in the Old Norse Þiðreks saga. The medieval German legend gives rise to the Dietrich of the Renaissance era Heldenbücher. The Old Norse form of the name was Þjóðríkr (spelled þiaurikʀ on the 9th-century Rök runestone). This became Tjodrik in Middle Norwegian.

The Dutch form Derek was used in England from the 15th century. Similarly, the Scandinavian Tjodrik is attested for the 12th century, but it is replaced by the Low German forms Ditrik, Dirk in the late medieval period. The spread of the Low German form to Middle Norwegian, Middle Danish and late Middle English or Early Modern English are part of a larger linguistic trend due to the influence of the Hanseatic League during this period.

- Antipope Theodoric (died 1102)
- Theodoric II, Duke of Lorraine (1070–1115)
- Theodoric I of Montbéliard (1045–1105)
- Theodoric II of Montbéliard (1080–1163)
- Thierry, Count of Flanders (1088–1168)
- Thierry of Chartres (died before 1155), philosopher also known as Theodoric the Breton
- Theodoric the Monk, 12th-century Norwegian Benedictine monk
- Theoderic (fl. c. 1172), author of the Libellus de locis sanctis, a travelogue and pilgrim's guide book of Palestine
- Theoderich von Treyden (died 1219), missionary and first bishop of Livonia
- Master Theodoric (before 1328? – 1381), court painter to Charles IV
- Theodoric of Freiberg (c. 1250 – c. 1311), German theologian and scientist
- Dirk III, Count of Holland (c. 982 – 1039), in Latin Theodoric
- Dirk IV, Count of Holland (c. 1020/1030 – 1049)
- Dirk V, Count of Holland (1052–1091)
- Dirk VI, Count of Holland (c. 1114–1157)
- Dirk VII, Count of Holland (died 1203)

== Modern era ==
The German form Dietrich was abbreviated to Dieter. The Low German and Dutch languages abbreviated Diederik as Dirk or Diede. French retains Thierry. The Scandinavian languages have borrowed Dirk and Diderik, replacing the native Tjodrik, while English borrowed Derek from Dutch and Terry from French.

== Fictional ==
- Prince Theodoric, an exiled Balkan royal in London in the sequence of novels A Dance to the Music of Time by Anthony Powell—a character based to some extent on Prince Paul of Yugoslavia

== See also ==
- Theodore (given name)
- Thierry
