= Owen Frederick Morton Tudor =

British Army officer

Owen Frederick Morton Tudor (1900–1987) was a British Army officer in the 3rd The King's Own Hussars and the husband of Larissa Tudor, a woman some claimed could have been Grand Duchess Tatiana Nikolaevna of Russia.

== Early life and education ==
Born on 21 October 1900 in Twickenham, Tudor was the son of Admiral Henry Morton Tudor and Evelyn Laura (née Toulmin) Tudor and a nephew of Admiral Sir Frederick Tudor. The original family name was Jones, but it was changed to Tudor in 1890. Tudor attended the junior school at St. Lawrence College, Ramsgate, and then joined the Royal Navy in 1915 and served as a midshipman aboard HMS Repulse. After he suffered an eye injury, he was forced to leave the navy in December 1917. He attended St Lawrence College in 1918 and was involved in the school's sports programmes. Tudor won the Saddle at the Royal Military College, Sandhurst, which well qualified him for the British Army's cavalry.

== First marriage and later career ==
He entered the 20th Hussars, but later transferred to the 3rd The King's Own Hussars in 1921. The regiment was stationed in Constantinople, where Tudor reportedly met Larissa Haouk, who was reportedly working as a belly dancer in a Constantinople nightclub, and in 1923 he married her against the wishes of the colonel of his regiment. He was then forced to leave the regiment and transferred to the 3rd Battalion, the Royal Tank Corps, based at Lydd, Kent.

Tudor was devastated by Larissa's death in 1926 and took flowers or arranged for flowers to be delivered to her grave each 10 June until a few years before his own death. However, he remarried quickly, to Hon. Noreen Rosamund Anne Tufton, daughter of John Tufton, 2nd Baron Hothfield. Tudor was readmitted to his former regiment in 1927 albeit serving only at extra regimental duty where he was quickly promoted.

To the surprise of the senior officers of the regiment Tudor was appointed to succeed the well liked Lieutenant Colonel William Petherick as commanding officer of the 3rd Hussars and took up the post on 19 September 1941. His command was however short lived. The regimental officers regarded his orders as bizarre and a deputation of mid ranking officers approached him on behalf of all the officers with the request that, as they had no confidence in him, Tudor should resign his command. Tudor refused and the brigade commander, on being informed by the regimental padre of the toxic situation that existed in the regiment when a major battle was in the offing, dismissed Tudor who was replaced on 8 October 1941 by Lieutenant Colonel Sir Peter Farquhar.

Tudor retired from the army in 1950 with the rank of lieutenant-colonel. He refused to answer letters inquiring about Larissa's past. His daughter by his second wife, Idonea Rosamund Ierne Tudor (born 26 June 1932), married Baron Nils Taube.
