= Dieter =

Dieter is a German given name, a short form of Dietrich, from theod+ric "people ruler" (see Theodoric). Rarely, it is a German form of the given name Theodore. It is also a surname.

== People ==
- Dieter Althaus (born 1958), German politician
- Dieter Bohlen (born 1954), German music producer
- Dieter Borsche (1909–1982), German actor
- Dieter Brömme, German-Canadian biochemist
- Dieter Brummer (1976–2021), Australian actor
- Dieter Dengler (1938–2001), American Vietnam War veteran
- Dieter Dierks (born 1943), German record producer, studio owner and musician
- Dieter Eiselen (born 1996), South African American football player
- Dieter Fersch (born 1946), German alpine skier
- Dieter Fox (born 1966), German roboticist
- Dieter Fuchs (born 1940), German football player, manager and coach
- Dieter Gerhardt (1935–2026), Soviet spy
- Dieter Haack (born 1934), German politician
- Dieter Hallervorden (born 1935), German comedian
- Dieter Thomas Heck (1937–2018), German television presenter, singer and actor
- Dieter Hecking (born 1964), German football (soccer) manager
- Dieter Helm (1941–2022), German farmer and politician
- Dieter Herzog (1946–2025), German footballer
- Dieter Hoeneß (born 1953), German football (soccer) player
- Dieter Kaufmann (1941–2025), Austrian composer
- Dieter Kühn (born 1956), East German football (soccer) player
- Dieter Laser (1942–2020), German actor
- Dieter Lüst (born 1956), German physicist
- Dieter Meier (born 1945), Swiss musician
- Dieter Nuhr (born 1960), German comedian
- Dieter Rams (born 1932), German industrial designer
- Dieter Roth (1930–1998), Swiss artist
- Dieter Ruehle (born 1968), American sports organist
- Dieter Schnebel (1930–2018), German composer
- Dieter Thoma (born 1969), German ski jumper
- Dieter F. Uchtdorf (born 1940), German aviator, airline executive, and religious leader
- Dieter Versen (1945–2025), German football player
- Dieter Wisliceny (1911–1948), German Nazi SS officer and perpetrator of the Holocaust executed for war crimes
- Dieter Zetsche (born 1953), German engineer and businessman

== Surname ==
- Bernie Dieter, German cabaret artist, songwriter, and performance artist
- Giovanni Battista Dieter (1903–1955), German bishop
- Hermann Dieter (1879–?), German architect
- Paul Dieter (born 1959), American sound engineer and record producer
- Robert J. Dieter (born 1946), American lawyer and diplomat
- William John Dieter (1912–1942), American airman

== Fictional characters ==
- Dieter, a recurring character on Saturday Night Live played by Mike Myers and host of a fictional German television show skit called Sprockets
- Dieter Hellstrom in Inglourious Basterds played by August Diehl
- the demon in Norman Mailer's book The Castle in the Forest

== See also ==
- Diether
- Dietrich (disambiguation)
- Hans-Dieter / Hans Dieter
- Theodoric
