= English rose =

English Rose may refer to:

- English rose (epithet), an Englishwoman who is naturally attractive
- "English Rose" (cultivars), rose cultivars bred by David C. H. Austin
- Tudor rose, the traditional floral heraldic emblem of England

== Music ==
- English Rose (album), an album by Fleetwood Mac
- "English Rose", a song by Motörhead from Motörizer
- "English Rose", a song by the Jam from All Mod Cons
- "English Rose", a song by Ed Sheeran from x (Wembley Edition)

== Other media ==
- The English Rose, a 1920 British silent film
- The English Roses, a series of children's books by Madonna

== See also ==
- The Rose of England, a traditional English song about Henry VII of England
- Rose of England, a 1937 British patriotic song
- Rose of England (horse), an English racehorse
- Tudor rose (disambiguation)
