= Hans-Dieter =

Hans-Dieter or, more rarely, Hans Dieter, are German masculine given names, composed of Hans and Dieter. Notable people with these names include:

== People named Hans-Dieter ==
- Hans-Dieter Bader (1938–2022), German operatic tenor
- Hans-Dieter Beckey (1921–1992), German physicist and mass spectrometry researcher
- Hans-Dieter Betz (born 1940), German experimental physicist
- Hans-Dieter Beutel (born 1962), German tennis player
- Hans-Dieter Brenner (born 1952), German banker
- Hans-Dieter Brüchert (born 1952), German freestyle wrestler
- Hans-Dieter Flick, known as Hansi Flick (born 1965), German football player and manager
- Hans-Dieter Frank (1919–1943), German Luftwaffe military aviator during World War II
- Hans-Dieter Karras (born 1959), German church musician, composer and organist
- Hans-Dieter Krampe (1937–2019), East German football player
- Hans-Dieter Kronzucker, known as Dieter Kronzucker (born 1936), German journalist and television presenter
- Hans-Dieter Lange (1926–2012), East German TV journalist and anchorman
- Hans-Dieter Lucas (born 1959), German diplomat
- Hans-Dieter Pophal (born 1937), German diver
- Hans-Dieter Riechel (1934–2014), German biathlete
- Hans-Dieter Schmidt (born 1948), German football player and manager
- Hans-Dieter Schulten (born 1940), German middle-distance runner
- Hans-Dieter Seelmann (born 1952), German football player
- Hans-Dieter Sues (1956–2026), German-born American palaeontologist
- Hans-Dieter Tippenhauer (1943–2021), German football manager
- Hans-Dieter Wacker (1958–1993), German football player

== People named Hans Dieter ==
- Hans Dieter Aigner (born 1958), Austrian artist and writer
- Hans Dieter Beck (1932–2025), German publisher
- Hans Dieter Betz (born 1931), German-born American scholar of the New Testament and Early Christianity
- Hans Dieter Kiesel, former German curler
- Hans Dieter Pötsch (born 1951), Austrian businessman

== See also ==
- Hanns Dieter Hüsch (1925–2005), German literary cabaret artist and author
