= Diks =

Diks is a surname. Notable people with the name include:

- Isabelle Diks (born 1965), Dutch politician
- Jamarro Diks (born 1995), Dutch footballer
- Kevin Diks (born 1995), Dutch-indonesian footballer

== See also ==
- Dik (disambiguation)
- Dix (disambiguation)
