= Tudor =

Tudor most commonly refers to:

- House of Tudor, a Welsh and English royal house of Welsh origins
  - Tudor period, a historical era in England and Wales coinciding with the rule of the Tudor dynasty

Tudor may also refer to:

== Architecture ==
- Tudor architecture, the final development of medieval architecture during the Tudor period (1485–1603)
  - Tudor Revival architecture, or Mock Tudor, later emulation of Tudor architecture
- Tudor House (disambiguation)

== People ==
- Tudor (name)

== Other uses ==
- Montres Tudor SA, a Swiss watchmaker owned by Rolex
  - United SportsCar Championship, sponsored by the Tudor watch brand in 2014
  - Tudor Pro Cycling Team, sponsored by Tudor watches since 2022
- HMS Tudor (P326), a British submarine
- Tudor, California, unincorporated community, United States
- Tudor, Mombasa, Kenya
- The Tudors, a TV series
- Tudor domain, in molecular biology
- Tudor rose, the traditional floral heraldic emblem of England
- Avro Tudor, a type of aeroplane
- Tudor, a name for two-door sedan body used by some manufacturers
- Tudor batteries, a brand of batteries
- Tudor Crisps, a brand of potato crisps
- Tudor (Kingston upon Thames ward) in London, England
- Tudor, a ward of Watford Borough Council in Hertfordshire, England

== See also ==
- Tudor rose (disambiguation)
- Tudur (disambiguation)
- Tewdwr Mawr (fl. 544–577), Breton king
