= Nils Taube =

Estonian entrepreneur

- Born: 25 July 1928; Estonia
- Died: 11 March 2008 (aged 79); London, England
- Occupation: Fund manager
- Title: Baron

Baron Nils Taube (25 July 1928 – 11 March 2008) was Britain's longest serving fund manager. A colleague of George Soros and advisor to Lord Rothschild, he also anticipated the 1987 stockmarket crash, while delivering an annual return of 15 percent for over 35 years while he ran his own fund.

== Biography ==
Baron Nils Otto von Taube was born on 25 July 1928 to Valerie Olga Doreen Girard de Soucanton, who was the daughter of William Girard de Soucanton, the Honorary British consul in Reval, owner of trading company Thomas Clayhills and Son and Beatrice Carr, and an upper-class Baltic German Swedish father Baron Axel von Taube, a member of baronial Taube af Karlö introduced at the House of Knights in Stockholm, his family were resettled to Reichsgau Wartheland in 1939 as part of the secret protocols of the Molotov–Ribbentrop Pact requiring the resettlement of ethnic Germans from Estonia and Latvia.

Taube moved to London in 1946 to study Chemistry, but with family to support he left for the City in 1948, joining Kitcat & Aitken as an office junior.

He made his name investing in then-undervalued German shares and rose rapidly through the ranks, becoming an analyst in 1951, fund manager in 1969 and senior partner in 1975. Taube's main fund was the St James's Place Greater European Progressive fund, which returned an average of 15.74% a year between 1969 and 2006. He also ran the St James's Place International Unit Trust, which grew an average of 15.23% a year between 1971 and 2006.

In the 1970s, he worked with George Soros, helping him to make money by introducing him to the gilts market. Soros was so impressed that he invited Taube on to the advisory board of the Quantum Group of hedge funds.

When in 1982, Jacob Rothschild's RIT and Northern bought a stake in Kitkat & Aitken it was said that the deal was devised to gain access to Taube, who became Rothschild's principal investment manager, a position he held until 1996. That year he left to establish Taube Hodson Stonex Partners, building up assets of £9 billion. In 2006 he started Nils Taube Investments, where he worked until his death.

After the collapse of Communism, Taube became involved in charitable and advisory work for his native country. He helped run the Soros Open Estonia Foundation, became an adviser to an Estonian cabinet committee overseeing state investment, and was a member of the prime minister's research and development council.

His charitable work, for which he was honoured by Estonia in 1998, included paying for a cancer research laboratory at Tartu University and the funding of physics research.

In 1969, Taube was one of the four founders of the Institute for Fiscal Studies.

Taube put his success down to caution, joking that "we only invest in countries where they wear overcoats in the winter". In recent months he had been buying gold and energy stocks, blaming the current market turmoil on the "mass stupidity" of "smartypants investors" who had been labouring under the delusion that it is possible to "buy listed companies and gear them up 10 times".

When asked recently if he was predicting a crash he replied: "I can't say I'm not" - and he described the present crisis as being "a cross between 1987 and the early 70s, when the market disintegrated".

After Estonia regained independence, he was a member of the Estonian prime minister's research and development council, advisor to an Estonian cabinet committee overseeing state investments and helped run the Soros Open Estonia Foundation. He funded a cancer research laboratory at Tartu University.

== Personal life ==
Taube married Idonea, born Tudor, daughter of Lt.-Col. Owen Frederick Morton Tudor and Hon. Noreen Rosamund Anne Tufton, Idonea is a granddaughter of Admiral Henry Morton Tudor and John Sackville Richard Tufton, 2nd Baron Hothfield of Hothfield and his wife Lady Ierne Louisa Arundel Hastings. She married Baron Nils Taube on 19 January 1954 and they have three sons.

== Death ==
Taube died of a stroke on 11 March 2008 in London, England, at the age of 79.
