= Natalia Dik =

Russian painter

- Born: July 26, 1961 (age 64); Novoaltaysk, Altai Krai, USSR
- Education: The St. Petersburg State Academic Institute of Fine Arts, Sculpture and Architecture
- Known for: Painting

Natalia Nikolaevna Dik (born July 26, 1961) is a contemporary Russian painter, art teacher, and member of Saint Petersburg Union of Artists.

== Life and work ==
Natalia Dik was born July 26, 1961, in the town of Chesnokovka (renamed to Novoaltaysk in 1962) in Altai Krai in the USSR.

From 1976 to 1980 she studied at the Novoaltaysk College of Art. Afterwards, she taught art at the Children's Art School in the village of Klyuchi in Altai Krai.

From 1983 to 1989 she studied at the Leningrad Institute of Painting, Sculpture and Architecture named after Ilya Repin, at the painting studio of Boris Ugarov. Her teacher was Viktor Reikhet as well. While studying, Natalia Dik received the so-called Ilya Repin grant awarded for high achievements.

Her graduation work "Na Onege" ("On the Onega river") was shown at the exhibition of the USSR Academy of Arts graduates and awarded with a Silver Medal in 1989.

Since 2002 Natalia Dik has been a member of the Saint Petersburg Union of Artists.

In 2009 Natalia Dik participated in the Noordwijk Painting Festival (Netherlands) and was awarded with a Rembrandt Painting Award nomination.

She works and lives both in St.Petersburg and Amsterdam.

== Exhibitions ==
- 1988 — "Soviet Art from the Academy", New York Academy of Art, New York (USA)
- 1989 — London (UK)
- 1990 — Milan (Italy)
- 1994 — London (UK)
- 1995 — "Die Bilderwelt der Natalia Dik", Lütt Galerie, Fahrdorf (Germany)
- 1996 — Brentwood (UK)
- 1997 — Galerie "Das Fenster", Kiel (Germany)
- 1998 — Moscow (Russia)
- 1999 — St.Petersburg (Russia)
- 2001 — St.Petersburg (Russia)
- 2002 — Helsinki (Finland)
- 2006 — s’Graveland (Netherlands)
- 2007 — Galerie Goda, Amsterdam (Netherlands)
- 2007 — Bolsjoi Oktober Festival, Amsterdam (Netherlands)
- 2007 — Galerie Amstelart, Brussels (Belgium)
- 2007 — Heemstede (Netherlands)
- 2008 — Galleri Sjöhästen, Stockholm (Sweden)
- 2008 — Liaohe Art Museum (China)
- 2009 — Bergen (Netherlands)
- 2010 — «De Egmondse Nieuwen 2010», Museum Kranenburgh, Bergen (Netherlands)
- 2010 — «De Oude Kerk geschilderd» ", Katwijks Museum, Katwijk (Netherlands)(
- 2011 — "Kunst10daagse Bergen", Bergen aan Zee (Netherlands)
- 2011 — "Ver weg, en toch zo dichtbij", Gallery PR² Art Podium, Amsterdam (Netherlands)
- 2012 год — «Санкт-Петербургскому Союзу художников 80 лет», Санкт-Петербург (Россия)
- 2019 год — «Lang Leve Rembrandt», Rijksmuseum, Amsterdam (Netherlands)
