= Tudor rose (disambiguation) =

The Tudor rose is a traditional heraldic emblem of England, first introduced by Henry VII.

Tudor rose may also refer to:

- Tudor Rose (film), a 1936 film also known as Nine Days a Queen
- Tudor Rose, Southall, a nightclub, live music venue and former cinema in Ealing, London

== See also ==
- Tudor (disambiguation)
- English Rose (disambiguation)
