= Teodorico =

Teodorico or Theodorico is a masculine given name which may refer to:

- Teodorico Teo Fabi (born 1955), Italian race car driver
- Teodorico Boyet Fernandez (born 1971), Filipino former basketball player and coach
- Teodorico Pedrini (1671–1746), Italian Vincentian priest, missionary for 36 years at the Imperial Court of China, musician and composer
- Teodorico Ranieri (died 1306), Italian cardinal, Archbishop of Pisa and Bishop of Palestrina
- Theodorico Haroldo de Oliveira (1937–1990), Brazilian footballer
- Theodorico de Sacadura Botte (1902–1987), Portuguese colonial administrator and entrepreneur in Mozambique

== See also ==
- Theodore
- Theodoric
