= Henry Morton Tudor Tudor =

Royal Navy Admiral (1855–1926)

Admiral Henry Morton Tudor Tudor JP (23 July 1855 – 3 January 1926) was an officer in the Royal Navy.

== Life and Career ==
Tudor was born Henry Morton Tudor Jones on 23 July 1855, the elder son of Harrington Rogers Jones of Harwich, Essex, and Henrietta Augusta Tudor of Cork, Ireland. In December 1890, he adopted his mother's maiden name of Tudor as his surname, as did his younger brother, Frederick Charles Tudor Jones (later Admiral Sir Frederick Tudor).

Joining the Royal Navy, he was promoted to the rank of Lieutenant with seniority of 1 June 1876, then Commander on 30 June 1888, and Captain on 31 December 1895. From 1898 to 1900, Captain Tudor was a member of the Naval Ordnance Department, in which Frederick was an Assistant Director of Naval Ordnance (1906-9) and Director for Naval Ordnance and Torpedoes (1912-14). Tudor was promoted to the rank of Rear-Admiral on 31 May 1906. In accordance with the provisions of the Order in Council of 8 December 1903, he was placed on the Retired List dated 30 November 1909. He was advanced to Vice-Admiral on 3 January 1911, and finally Admiral on the Retired List on 7 December 1913.

== Naval commands ==
In total, Tudor was appointed commanding officer of five vessels:

- HMS Bellona (1 January 1893 - 1 June 1894 and 29 August 1894 - 5 November 1895)
- HMS Barossa (2 June - 28 August 1894)
- HMS Æolus (5 June - 4 August 1897)
- HMS Venus (14 February 1900 - 28 May 1901)
- HMS Cressy (28 May 1901 - 7 February 1905)

== Death ==
Tudor died at Burnham, Shalford, Surrey, on 3 January 1926, aged seventy. His funeral took place at Shalford Parish Church on 5 January.

== Personal life ==
Tudor married firstly Augusta Frances Courtenay Dickinson in 1883 and secondly Evelyn Laura Toulmin in 1896. By his second marriage Tudor had three children: Phyllis Evelyn Tudor (1897–1979), Daphne Edna Toulmin Tudor (1899–1984), and Owen Frederick Morton Tudor (1900–1987). Owen was an officer in the 3rd The King's Own Hussars and the husband of Larissa Tudor, who claimed to be Grand Duchess Tatiana Nikolaevna of Russia.
