= Frederick Tudor =

Royal Navy Admiral (1863–1946)

Admiral Sir Frederick Tudor KCB KCMG
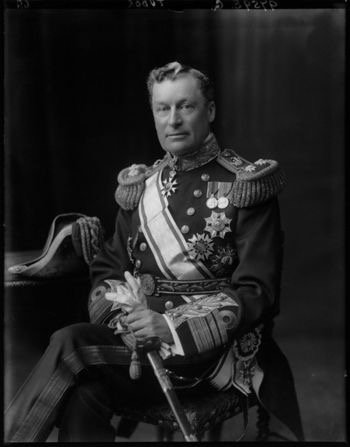
- Born: 29 March 1863; Stoke Damerel, Devon, England
- Died: 14 April 1946 (aged 83); Dennistoun, Camberley, Surrey, England
- Military career
- Allegiance: United Kingdom
- Branch: Royal Navy
- Service years: 1876–1922
- Rank: Admiral
- Commands: HMS Prometheus; HMS Challenger; HMS Superb; China Station; Royal Naval College, Greenwich
- Conflicts: World War I
- Awards: Knight Commander of the Order of the Bath; Knight Commander of the Order of St Michael and St George; Order of the Sacred Treasure (1st Class) – Japan; Order of the Rising Sun (2nd Class) – Japan; Order of St. Anne (1st Class) – Russia; Order of the Striped Tiger (1st Class) – China

Admiral Sir Frederick Charles Tudor Tudor, KCB, KCMG (born Jones; 29 March 1863 – 14 April 1946) was a British Royal Navy officer who went on to be Third Sea Lord.

== Early life and career ==
Tudor was born in Stoke Damerel, Devon, the younger son of Harrington Rogers Jones, of Harwich, and Henrietta Augusta Tudor, of Cork, Ireland. He came first in order of merit out of 42 candidates who passed the examination for naval cadetships in 1875. Jones was promoted to the rank of lieutenant with seniority of 29 March 1884. On 26 December 1890, he adopted his mother's maiden name and changed his surname to Tudor. His brother Henry Morton Tudor Tudor was also a Royal Navy admiral.

Tudor was promoted to the rank of commander on 31 December 1896. He was appointed an Assistant to the Director of Naval Ordnance from the same date. He was appointed to HMS Hannibal on 10 May 1898. Tudor was appointed in command of HMS Prometheus in early 1902, and was in command of this ship when she took part in the fleet review held at Spithead on 16 August 1902 for the coronation of King Edward VII. He was promoted to captain on 31 December 1902, and subsequently held commands in HMS Challenger and HMS Superb.

After serving as Assistant Director of Naval Ordnance at the Admiralty from 1906 to 1909 he was given command of the Gunnery School at Whale Island in Portsmouth in 1910. He went on to be Director of Naval Ordnance and Torpedoes from 1912 to 1914.

He served in World War I as Third Sea Lord from 1914 to 1917 when he became Commander-in-Chief, China Station. Tudor was responsible for arranging the escape of refugees from Siberia through Japan and on to Canada. In 1917, he was awarded the Japanese Order of the Rising Sun, Gold and Silver Star, which represents the second highest of eight classes associated with the award. Notice of the King's permission to accept and to display this honour was duly published in the London Gazette. Tudor later became President of the Royal Naval College, Greenwich in 1920 before retiring in 1922.

Tudor was an uncle of Owen Frederick Morton Tudor, who married Larissa Tudor, a woman some people have claimed might have really been Grand Duchess Tatiana Nikolaevna of Russia.

== Notes ==
Military offices
Preceded by Sir Gordon Moore	Third Sea Lord; 1914–1917	Succeeded by Sir Lionel Halsey
Preceded by Sir William Grant	Commander-in-Chief, China Station; 1917–1919	Succeeded by Sir Alexander Duff
Preceded by Sir William Pakenham	President, Royal Naval College, Greenwich; 1920–1922	Succeeded by Sir Herbert Richmond
