= William Tudor (surgeon) =

Army surgeon and civic figure for Bath, Somerset (1769-1845)

William Tudor FRCS
- Born: 18 April 1769
- Died: 9 July 1845 (aged 76); Kelston Knoll, near Bath
- Burial place: All Saints Church, Weston
- Monuments: Plaque, Bath Abbey. Window, All Saints Church, Weston, near Bath
- Occupations: Army surgeon, 1791-1805 Inspector of Hospitals for the Forces, 1799-1805 Surgeon, Bath General Hospital and Surgeon to Royalty at Bath, 1806-1836 Bath Councilman: Constable, Bailiff, Alderman, Mayor, Magistrate, 1808-1835

Signature
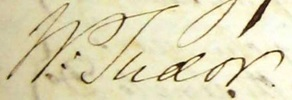

William Tudor (18 April 1769 - 9 July 1845) was a British army and private surgeon, who served the royal family and the residents of Bath, in the county of Somerset, United Kingdom. He was the mayor of Bath between 1828 and 1829.

== Life ==
William Tudor was born on 18 April 1769, the second son of Thomas Tudor (1737–1831), surgeon in Abergavenny, and Lucy Draper (1730–1776), both with backgrounds embedded within the gentry of their time and from whom he derived the necessary financial ability to purchase his commission in the army at the age of 22.

William's grandfather, James Tudor Morgan was Sheriff of Monmouthshire and his great grandfather, Richard Tudor, and great great grandfather, Thomas Tudor, were both auditors of Crown estates in Wales, all holding substantial properties. Lucy's grandfather, Squire William Draper, had likewise inherited substantial estates in the East Riding of Yorkshire from the father of his wife, Anne Daniell of Beswick.

== Career ==
William Tudor was appointed as a surgeon, by purchase, to the 2nd Dragoon Guards in 1791. He became a staff surgeon under the Duke of York in the Flanders campaign in 1794. He became a member of the Company of Surgeons in 1796, which in 1800 became the Royal College of Surgeons in London. In 1799 he was appointed as an assistant-inspector of Army Hospitals. In 1805 Tudor retired on half-pay as deputy-inspector, and then promoted to inspector, with a brevet rank, in 1821. On the 21 May 1806, Tudor was elected Surgeon at Bath General Hospital.

Tudor was surgeon to Caroline Princess of Wales, to the Duke of York, Duke of Cumberland, and the Duke of Cambridge. On 10 January 1818, Tudor was appointed surgeon-extraordinary to Queen Charlotte.

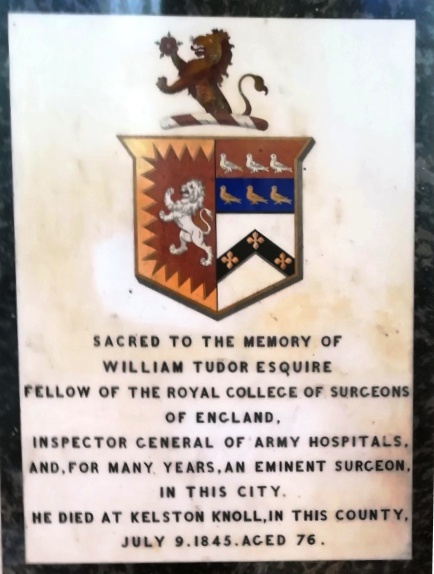
Memorial inscription in Bath Abbey

The novelist and diarist Fanny Burney who live in Bath made frequent references to William Tudor in her letters. This included a letter to her son Alexander in 1717 describing the arrival of the Queen to Bath Pump House to take the waters. William Tudor was in attendance at the royal levée along with many other representatives of Bath society. He later administered to other royal visitors to Bath in 1717–1718 including Princess Elizabeth. Tudor treated Burney's French husband, Alexandre d'Arblay, who was prone to a range of abdominal illnesses. Whilst she had every confidence in Tudor's abilities, her husband's diaries record that he certainly didn't enjoy the surgical interventions. Burney's husband died later in 1818.

William Wordsworth, taking a cure at Bath in April 1839, was put under the care of "that good man and kind, Mr Tudor", and visited and dined with him at Kelston Knoll, Tudor's fine house, near Bath. In 1817, Tudor was practising from 5 Queen's Parade in Bath.

William Tudor became mayor of Bath in 1828.

He was elected to the Fellow of the Royal College of Surgeons (FRCS) in 1844, close to his death.

== Death ==
Tudor died at Kelston Knoll on 9 July 1845, aged 76 years. He was buried on 17 July 1845 at All Saints church, Weston, and is commemorated by a memorial inscription in Bath Abbey,, which describes him as "an eminent surgeon in this city".
