= Chesnokovka =

Chesnokovka may refer to:

- Chesnokovka, name of the town of Novoaltaysk, Altai Krai, Russia, before 1962
- Chesnokovka, Republic of Bashkortostan, a village (selo) in the Republic of Bashkortostan, Russia
- Chesnokovka, Orenburg Oblast, a village (selo) in Orenburg Oblast, Russia
