= Tudor House =

Tudor Revival architecture is an architectural phenomenon throughout the Western world particularly in the Anglosphere.

Tudor House may refer to:

== United Kingdom ==
- Tudor House and Garden, Southampton, Hampshire, England
- Tudor House, Chester, Cheshire, England
- Tudor House, Langport, Somerset, England
- Tudor House Museum, Weymouth, Dorset, England
- Tudor House, Stevenage, Hertfordshire, England
- Tudor Merchant's House, Tenby, Pembrokeshire, Wales

== Elsewhere ==
- Tudor House School, Moss Vale, New South Wales, Australia
- Owen Tudor Hedges House, Hedgesville, West Virginia, United States
- Tudor Fieldhouse, Houston, Texas, United States

== See also ==
- House of Tudor, a Welsh and English royal house of Welsh origins
