= Dieter Brömme =

German-Canadian biochemist

Dieter Brömme is a German-Canadian biochemist, currently a Canada Research Chair in Proteases and Diseases at University of British Columbia.
