= Dieter (disambiguation) =

Dieter is a German given name and a surname. It may also refer to:

- A person who is dieting
- Dieter: Der Film, a 2006 film about Dieter Bohlen
  - Dieter: Der Film (soundtrack), the soundtrack of the film
- Dieter Township, Roseau County, Minnesota, United States
