= Hans-Dieter Krampe =

East German footballer (1937–2019)

Personal information
- Date of birth: 6 January 1937
- Place of birth: Halle, Germany
- Date of death: 3 December 2019 (aged 82)
- Position: Defender

Youth career
- 1951–1954: BSG Post Halle
- 1954–1955: BSG Aktivist Lauchhammer
- 1955: Vorwärts Prenzlau

Senior career*
Years	Team	Apps	(Gls)
1955–1971	Vorwärts Berlin	265	(6)
Total		265	(6)

International career
1959–1965	East Germany	28	(0)

Managerial career
- Vorwärts Strausberg
- * Club domestic league appearances and goals

Hans-Dieter Krampe (6 January 1937 – 3 December 2019) was an East German footballer.

== Career ==
The defender played over 250 matches in the East German top-flight for Vorwärts Berlin.

Between 1959 and 1965 Krampe won 28 caps for the East Germany national team.
