= Dedrick =

Dedrick may refer to:

== People ==
=== Surname ===
- Jim Dedrick (born 1968), American Major League Baseball player
- Rusty Dedrick (1918–2009), American swing and bop jazz trumpeter and composer
- Zadock Dedrick or Zadoc Dederick, American inventor

=== Given name ===
- Dedrick Dodge (born 1967), former American football safety
- Dedrick Epps (born 1988), former American football tight end
- Paul Dedrick Gray (1972–2010), American musician, bassist, a backing vocalist, songwriter
- Dedrick Harrington (born 1983), American football linebacker
- Dedrick Martin Langve (1892–1959), American lawyer and politician
- Mack 10, born Dedrick Rolison (1971), American rapper and actor
- Dedrick Roper (born 1981), former American football linebacker

== Places ==
- Dedrick, California, a ghost town in Trinity County, California
