= The Rose of England =

Traditional song

The Rose of England is an English-language folk song, catalogued as Child ballad 166 and Roud Folk Song Index 4001. It is an account of Henry VII of England claiming the throne from Richard III of England, frequently allegorically. It may be the oldest ballad on the Battle of Bosworth Field, and as old as 1485, but the earliest manuscript is from the mid-seventeenth century.

== Synopsis ==
A lovely garden (England) had a rose tree, which produced a king over England, France, and Ireland. A boar wrought havoc in the garden, but an eagle bore a rose away to safety. The rose returned and asked the eagle, his father, for aid. The eagle rejoiced.

Sir Rhys ap Thomas brought Wales to his support. The Earl of Richmond - as Henry VII was then known - won Shrewsbury with the aid of letters from Sir William Stanley. When Mitton, who had held the town against him, said that he knew no king but Richard and promised to serve him if he were named king, Henry pardoned him.

The boar and the eagle must meet, which causes the old eagle to lament the danger. The eagle fought, with the aid of the talbot, the unicorn, and the hart's head, and won, making the garden fresh and green again.

== Commentary ==
Many of the allegorical statements refer to the shields of those involved.

The garden is England, and the rose tree the House of Lancaster (the Red Rose of Lancaster being associated with it), with the king being Henry V of England. The boar can represent either the House of York (whose Edward IV deposed the House of Lancaster) or specifically Richard III of England (whose symbol was the white boar), who endangered the future Henry VII of England's life, causing his uncle Jasper Tudor to flee the country with him - or represents both.
