= Kelston Knoll =

Building in Kelston, Somerset, England

Coordinates: 51.3961°N 2.4155°W

Kelston Knoll is a Grade II listed building on the National Heritage List for England, located in the parish of Kelston, a village near Bath, in Somerset, England.

The house is made from ashlar stone, with a slate roof, and was built in the Italianate style. It was completed in 1835. In the 1840s the house was owned by William Tudor, a surgeon and the Mayor of Bath. One of only three extant twopenny Mulready stationery letters sent on 6 May 1840, introduced on that date along with the Penny Black, the world's first postage stamp, was sent to Tudor's daughter, Isabella, who lived at the house. The letter is now in the Bath Postal Museum. Tudor died at Kelston Knoll on 9 July 1845, aged 77. His wife Julia Purvis survived him, and died at Kelston Knoll on 9 August 1890, in her 93rd year.

Henry Overton Wills III, of the family who owned the tobacco manufacturers W.D. & H.O. Wills, purchased the house in 1895. In 1911, after his death, his estate was valued at two million pounds.

The house was subsequently owned by Walter Combermere Lee Floyd, who had been Deputy Consulting Engineer to the Government of India for Railways. He died on 31 March 1917, and his widow, Cecilia Mary Louisa, continued to live in the house until her death on 24 December 1928.

By 1932 the house was occupied by the Rev. John Basset Baron Collins, who lived there until his sudden death on 3 September 1937. Following this, Mrs Lyndon Moore, widow of Dr. P. Lyndon Moore, was living there in 1939.

In 1943, Colonel Mark Whitwill CBE, DSO lived in Kelston Knoll with his wife. He put the house up for auction on 30 March 1950. It was described as in excellent order, with panelling, Georgian mantels and find mahogany doors. There were three reception rooms and a large music room (38 ft × 18 ft), and the large entrance hall had a stone staircase leading up to nine bed and dressing rooms, with three modern bath rooms. Central heating and mains electricity were installed. Outside were about ten acres of paddocks with a riding school, walled gardens, hard tennis court and woodland, making a total of about 15 acres.

The occupants in 1964 were stated to be Mr. and Mrs. A. J. Miller

In the particulars from an estate agent when Kelston Knoll was offered for sale in 1990, it is described as a "small country estate" which had been in the same ownership for forty years, comprising 14 acres, including two walled gardens, nine acres of grazing land and a coach house with gardener's flat. The eight-bedroomed house included a conservatory, sitting room, ballroom, dining room and a panelled drawing room. The asking price was "about £750,000".

The house was put up for sale again in 2017 for £4.5 million.
