= Dik =

Dik or DIK may refer to:

== People ==
=== Surname ===
- Carla Dik-Faber (born 1971), Dutch art historian and politician
- Natalia Dik (born 1961), Russian painter
- Simon C. Dik (1940–1995), Dutch linguist
- Wim Dik (born 1939), former head of Royal PTT Nederland NV

=== Given name ===
- Dirk Bouwmeester or Dik Bouwmeester (born 1967), Dutch experimental physicist
- Dik Browne (1917–1989), American cartoonist
- Dik Cadbury, English multi-instrumentalist
- Dik Davis (also called Dik Davies), drummer
- Dick Esser or Dik Esser (1918–1979), Dutch field hockey player (usually misspelled "Dick")
- Dik Evans (born 1957), British-Irish rock guitarist
- Dik Wolfson (born 1933), Dutch economist, civil servant and politician.

=== Fictional characters ===
- Dik Trom, protagonist boy of a Dutch children's book series
- Dikkie Dik, protagonist cat of a Dutch children's book series

== Other uses ==
- Dickinson Theodore Roosevelt Regional Airport (IATA code), US

== See also ==
- Richard, a given name sometimes shortened to Dik
- Diederik, a given name sometimes shortened to Dik
- Dik-dik, a small antelope
- Dik Dik, an Italian beat-pop-rock band
- Dick (disambiguation)
