= Tietje =

Tietje is a surname and given name. Notable people with the name include:

- Les Tietje (1910–1996), American baseball player
- Rona Tietje (born 1981), German politician
- Tietje Spannenburg-Pagels (1906 – after 1933), Dutch kortebaan speed skater
