= Tudur =

Tudur ([ˈtɨ̞dɨ̞r]), from old Welsh Tutir, is the Welsh form of the given name Theodoric and may refer to:

- Tewdrig, king of Glywysing (fl. 6th century)
- Tudur Hen (Theodoric the Old), eponymous founder of the Tudor dynasty
- Tudur ap Goronwy (died 1367), Welsh landowner, soldier and administrator of the Tudors of Penmynydd family
- Tudur ap Gruffudd (c. 1357 – 1405), participated in the rebellion of his brother, Owain Glyndŵr
- Tudur ap Gwyn Hagr (fl. second half of the 14th century), a Welsh language poet
- Tudur Penllyn (1420–1490), Welsh-language poet
- Tudur Aled (1465–1525), late medieval Welsh poet, born in Llansannan, Denbighshire
- Harri Tudur (1457–1509), the Welsh-language name for Henry VII of England (r. from 1485)
- Siôn Tudur (1522–1602), Welsh-language poet
- R. Tudur Jones (1921–1998), Welsh nationalist and Calvinist theologian
- Owain Tudur Jones (born 1984), Welsh international footballer

== See also ==
- Tudor (disambiguation)
- Pandy Tudur, village in the county borough of Conwy, north Wales
