= Larissa Tudor =

Romanov impostor

Larissa Feodorovna Tudor
- Born: 1896, 1897 or 1898; Unknown
- Died: July 18, 1926; Lydd, England
- Spouse: Owen Frederick Morton Tudor
- Parent(s): Adolph Haouk, father (reportedly)

Larissa Feodorovna Tudor (died July 18, 1926) was the wife of Owen Frederick Morton Tudor, an officer of the 3rd (The King's Own) Hussars. Following her death, it was rumoured that she was in truth Grand Duchess Tatiana Nikolaevna of Russia, the second daughter of Nicholas II of Russia, and of Tsarina Alexandra.

Following World War I, she met and married her husband. Upon her death at roughly the age of 28 in Lydd, Kent, England, due to pulmonary tuberculosis and spinal caries, she bequeathed to him an unusually large inheritance equivalent to a local resident's yearly earnings. This fact, combined with irregularities in the available information about her, such as the different ages given on her marriage certificate, her tombstone, and her death certificate, the differences in the names given for her, the conflicting stories about her background, Tudor's inexplicable income and return to the 3rd Hussars and promotion in rank following Larissa's death, and certain physical details, led to speculation by author Michael Occleshaw that she was in reality the Grand Duchess and had escaped the assassination of the Romanovs after the Russian Revolution of 1917.

More than 60 years after her death, neighbors immediately identified photographs of Tatiana as being Larissa.

Historians believe that the imperial family were all assassinated on July 17, 1918; however, rumors of the survival of one or more Romanov family members have persisted for nearly 90 years.

== Marriage ==
Larissa married Owen Frederick Morton Tudor, an officer of the 3rd Hussars, in 1923 at the Register Office of St George's, Hanover Square, in London, England. Her marriage certificate listed her address as the York Hotel, Mayfair, and her father as Adolph Haouk. Her age in 1923 was given as 27 on her marriage certificate, though her death certificate in 1926 gave her age as 29 and her tombstone gave her age at death as 28.

== Early life ==
There is little available information about her nationality or early life. According to the wife of one of Tudor's brother officers, there were two accounts about Larissa's background. One was that she was the daughter of a pork butcher, whom Tudor met when he was posted at Constantinople in 1921. Larissa was said to be a belly-dancer at a night club in Constantinople. A second account of her early life was that she was a woman of good family from St. Petersburg. The colonel of Tudor's regiment reportedly sent brother officers either to teach him some Russian before his marriage or to try to persuade Tudor not to marry Larissa. Tudor, who was in love with Larissa, went ahead with the marriage and was forced to leave the regiment. One of Tudor's first cousins was told that Larissa had escaped from Russia and had been "earning her living the only way she could."

== Illness ==
Following the marriage, Tudor transferred to the 3rd Battalion, the Royal Tank Corps, which was based at Lydd, Kent, England. Larissa was ill with pulmonary tuberculosis and spinal caries and was unable to sit up straight. She spent her days reclining in an elongated bath chair. The couple lived privately, but were often overheard laughing in the garden of their house. Though Tudor's income had been reduced when he left the Hussars and he had no personal fortune, he had enough money to pay for a nurse for Larissa and to keep a horse stabled at a nearby farm.

== Death ==
When Larissa died, she left an inheritance that amounted to two years' pay for the majority of Britain's population. Larissa's husband was devastated by her death and had to be held up by other men at her gravesite. Larissa was buried in a cemetery in Lydd. Her gravestone bore the inscription "To My Very Beloved Larissa Feodorovna Who Died July 18th, 1926 Aged 28 Years The Wife of Owen Tudor, 3rd The King's Own Hussars". Tudor brought flowers to her grave every year on June 10 up until a few years before his own death. Occleshaw pointed out in his book The Romanov Conspiracy: The Romanovs and the House of Windsor that Grand Duchess Tatiana's birthday was June 10.

== Claims made that she was a grand duchess ==
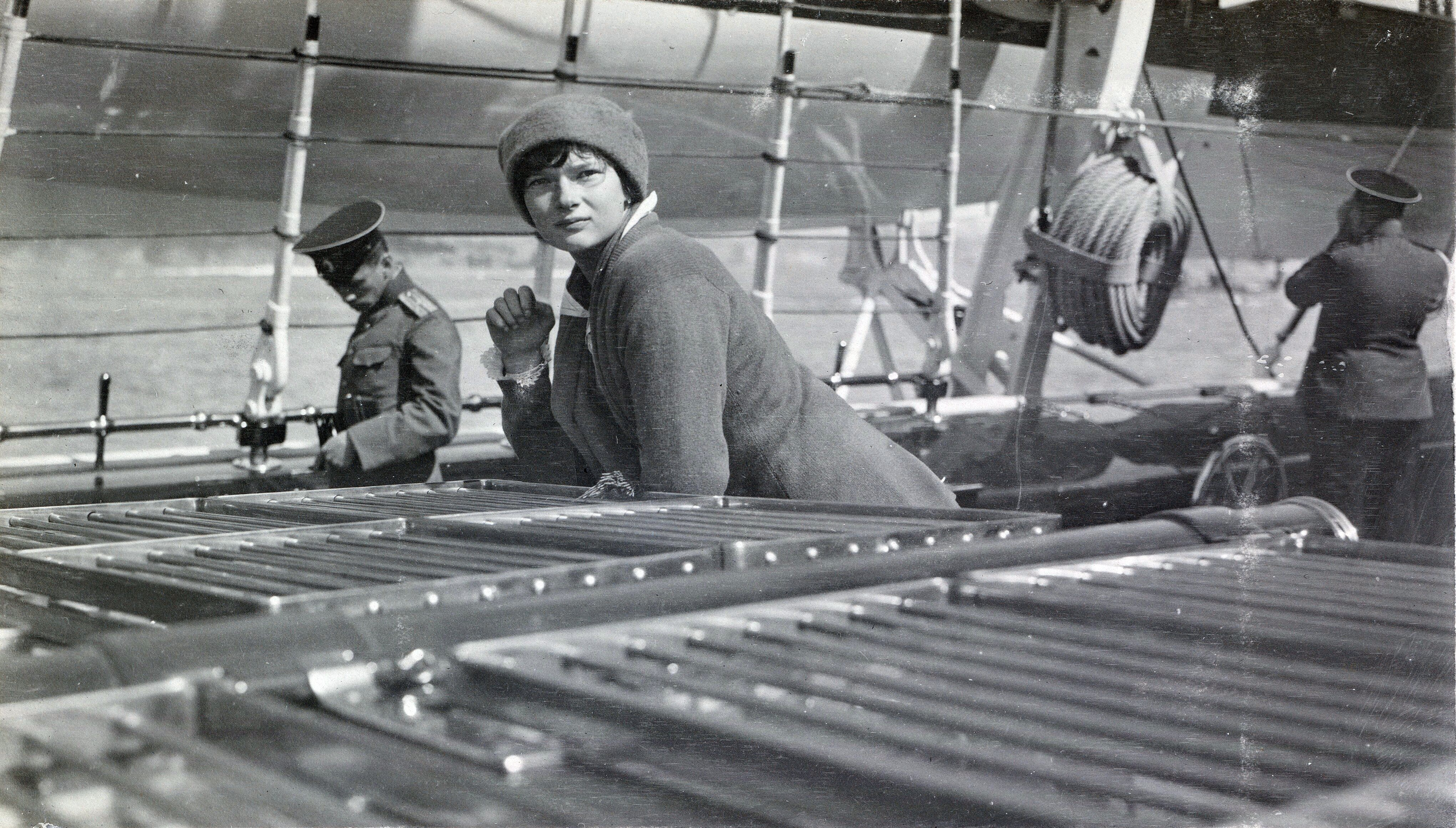
Grand Duchess Tatiana Nikolaevna of Russia aboard the imperial yacht in 1914. Courtesy: Beinecke Library.

Following her death, some women in Lydd became fascinated by Larissa's story and contacted author Michael Occleshaw about her. Occleshaw saw irregularities in the available information about Larissa, such as the different ages given on her marriage certificate, her tombstone, and her death certificate, the differences in the names given for her, the conflicting stories about her background, and Tudor's inexplicable income and return to the 3rd Hussars and promotion in rank following Larissa's death. There was no record of a woman named Larissa Haouk entering England between 1918 and 1923.

Occleshaw showed portraits of Grand Duchess Tatiana Nikolaevna, along with portraits of unrelated women from the same period, to people who had known Larissa. More than 60 years after Larissa's death, her former neighbours identified portraits of the grand duchess as Larissa. Larissa was described as "being tall, amazingly thin and very beautiful, having brown hair with an auburn tinge to it." This physical description was very similar to descriptions of the Grand Duchess Tatiana, wrote Occleshaw.

== Speculation about the rescue of a grand duchess ==
In his 1993 book The Romanov Conspiracies: The Romanovs and the House of Windsor, Occleshaw speculates that Tatiana was flown out of Siberia by British agents in mid-July 1918 and, with assistance from the Japanese, transferred into the hands of Prince Arthur of Connaught, who was traveling from Japan to Canada aboard the Japanese battle cruiser Kirishima in July 1918. With the prince's party, the rescued grand duchess allegedly traveled across Canada before she sailed to the United Kingdom on the Canadian Pacific Ocean Service Ltd. vessel Corsican, which arrived in the United Kingdom in August 1918.

Occleshaw speculated that a rescue mission by air might have been considered by the British at the behest of King George V. An entry in the journal of Col. Richard Meinertzhagen asserts that the rescue took place on July 1, 1918, a date that might have been inaccurate. Meinertzhagen wrote that the rescue was not a complete success because not all the family was rescued. "One child was literally thrown into the plane at Ekaterinburg, much bruised and brought to England where she still is." Critics say that Meinertzhagen's diaries were fantasy. Meinertzhagen's wife, Amorel, traveled from Canada to the United Kingdom aboard the Canadian ship Corsican in August 1918, while the war was still taking place. In the adjoining cabin was a 22-year-old masseuse named Marguerite Lindsay, for whom Occleshaw could find no birth or permanent address records. Occleshaw identified Marguerite Lindsay as a possible cover name for a rescued grand duchess. However, the Ellis Island Web site has two separate listings for travel to New York by passengers named Marguerite Lindsay in 1915 and again in 1923. The Marguerite Lindsay who traveled in 1915 gave her age as 18 and her place of residence as Montreal, Quebec, Canada; the Marguerite Lindsay who traveled in 1923 gave her age as 27 and her residence as New York City. The Bolsheviks were also reportedly alarmed by an airplane flying over the Ipatiev House in mid-July 1918, Sir Charles Eliot, the British High Commissioner for Siberia, later reported. When interrogated by White Russian Army investigators in January 1919, a Red Guard named George Nikolaevich Biron, the Chief Military Communications Officer of the Bolshevik Third Army at Perm, claimed Tatiana had "run away or disappeared with a Red Army officer, a commander of the guard," before the murder of the Tsar.

A photograph that appeared September 4, 1918, in the Harrogate Herald depicts a group of exiled royalty and aristocrats including Grand Duchess Maria Georgievna, who was living at Harrogate. Occleshaw speculates that a young woman in the photo whose face is half-hidden behind Lady Radcliffe, the wife of Sir Joseph Edward Radcliffe, 4th Baronet, might be the escaped grand duchess. In his opinion, the photograph bears "an uncanny resemblance to the Grand Duchess Tatiana." The woman was the only person in the group who was not identified in the newspaper photo caption. Grand Duchess Maria Georgievna founded four hospitals in the area. A sanitarium for treatment of tuberculosis was located near Harrogate at Knaresborough. Spinal caries often developed following an injury, such as that caused by being thrown from a horse or thrown into an airplane, as Meinertzhagen wrote that the rescued grand duchess had been. Occleshaw also speculated that the conditions under which the Romanovs were held would have been "ideal" for a member of the imperial family to contract tuberculosis. Guards at the Ipatiev House, where the imperial family was held captive at Ekaterinburg, later commented on the sickly appearance of Grand Duchess Tatiana and her elder sister Olga. Tatiana had grown extremely thin and "looked as if she was not far from the morgue," recalled one guard.

Since Larissa had mentioned to neighbors that her happiest time in England had been spent in Yorkshire, Occleshaw speculated that the escaped grand duchess might have spent time in a medical facility near Harrogate under the patronage of Grand Duchess Maria Georgievna. Owen Tudor's uncle was Sir Frederick Tudor, a British admiral who was the Commander of the China Station in 1918. Frederick Tudor was responsible for arranging the escape of refugees from Siberia to Japan and then on to Canada. Occleshaw speculated that Owen Tudor might have met Larissa during a visit to his uncle. Occleshaw also noted that the patronymic on Larissa's gravestone was Feodorovna, which was also the patronymic adopted by Grand Duchess Tatiana's mother, Tsarina Alexandra, and that the surname Haouk bears close resemblance to the surname of Countess Julia von Hauke, an ancestress of the Mountbatten family and closely associated with Tatiana's Hessian relatives.

== Romanov grave ==
Two bodies were missing from the mass Romanov grave found in Siberia and exhumed in 1991. Those bodies were identified as Tsarevich Alexei Nikolaevich of Russia and one of the four grand duchesses, generally thought by Russians to be Maria and by Americans to be Anastasia. Historians believe that all of the Romanovs, including Tatiana, were assassinated at Ekaterinburg.

In July 2007, 46-year-old builder Sergei Pogorelov (part of a team from an amateur history group who spent free summer weekends looking for the lost Romanovs) said that after stumbling on a small burned area of ground covered with nettles near Yekaterinburg he had discovered bones that belonged to "a boy and a young woman roughly the ages of Nicholas’ 13-year-old hemophiliac son, Alexei, and a daughter whose remains also never have been found."

On 30 April 2008, DNA tests were performed on the two bodies. A U.S. laboratory compared DNA from the bodies to a DNA sample given by Prince Philip, Duke of Edinburgh, whose first cousins, once removed were the Romanov children. The test confirmed that the bodies belonged to members of the imperial family: Tsarevich Alexei Nikolaevich and Grand Duchess Maria, according to Russian news agencies. Therefore, all the Romanovs have now been accounted for, disproving claims of survival.

== See also ==
- Romanov impostors
- Look alike
