= Grand Duchess Tatiana Nikolaevna of Russia =

Second daughter of Tsar Nicholas II of Russia(1897–1918)

Grand Duchess Tatiana Nikolaevna
- Tatiana in 1914
- Born: 10 June 1897; Peterhof Palace, Saint Petersburg, Russia
- Died: 17 July 1918 (aged 21); Ipatiev House, Yekaterinburg, Russia
- Cause of death: Gunshot wounds (murder)
- Burial: 17 July 1998; Peter and Paul Cathedral, Saint Petersburg
Names
- Tatiana Nikolaevna Romanova
- House: Holstein-Gottorp-Romanov
- Father: Nicholas II of Russia
- Mother: Alix of Hesse and by Rhine
- Religion: Russian Orthodoxy
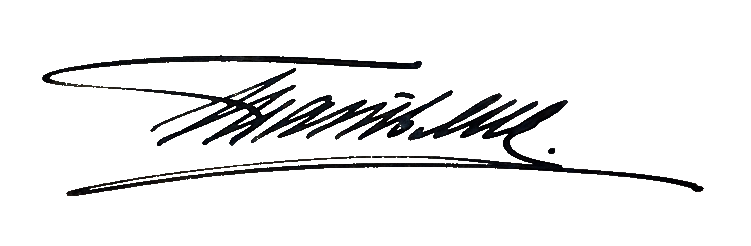
- Signature

Grand Duchess Tatiana Nikolaevna of Russia (Russian: Татьяна Николаевна, romanized: Tatyana Nikolayevna; 10 June [O.S. 29 May] 1897 (Note: Starting in 1900, Tatiana's birthday was celebrated on 11 June new style) – 17 July 1918) was the second child of Tsar Nicholas II, the last monarch of Russia, and Tsarina Alexandra Feodorovna. She was born at Peterhof Palace, near Saint Petersburg.

Tatiana was the younger sister of Grand Duchess Olga and the elder sister of Grand Duchess Maria, Grand Duchess Anastasia, and Tsarevich Alexei. Throughout her life, she was considered to be the most beautiful of all her sisters and the most aristocratic in appearance. She was known amongst her siblings as "the governess" for her domineering but also maternal ways. Tatiana was the closest of all the children to her mother (Tsarina Alexandra), often spending many hours reading to her. During World War I, she chaired many charitable committees and (along with her older sister, Grand Duchess Olga) trained to become a nurse. She tended to wounded soldiers on the grounds of Tsarskoye Selo from 1914 to 1917. Her time as a nurse came to an end with her family's arrest in 1917 after the first Russian Revolution.

Her murder by Bolshevik revolutionaries on 17 July 1918 resulted in her canonization as a passion bearer by the Russian Orthodox Church. Tatiana and all her siblings were soon rumored to have survived the murder, and dozens of impostors claimed to be surviving Romanovs; author Michael Occleshaw speculated that a woman named Larissa Tudor might have been Tatiana. However, the deaths of all the last Tsar's family, including Tatiana, at the hands of Bolsheviks have since been established by scientific evidence.

== Appearance and personality ==
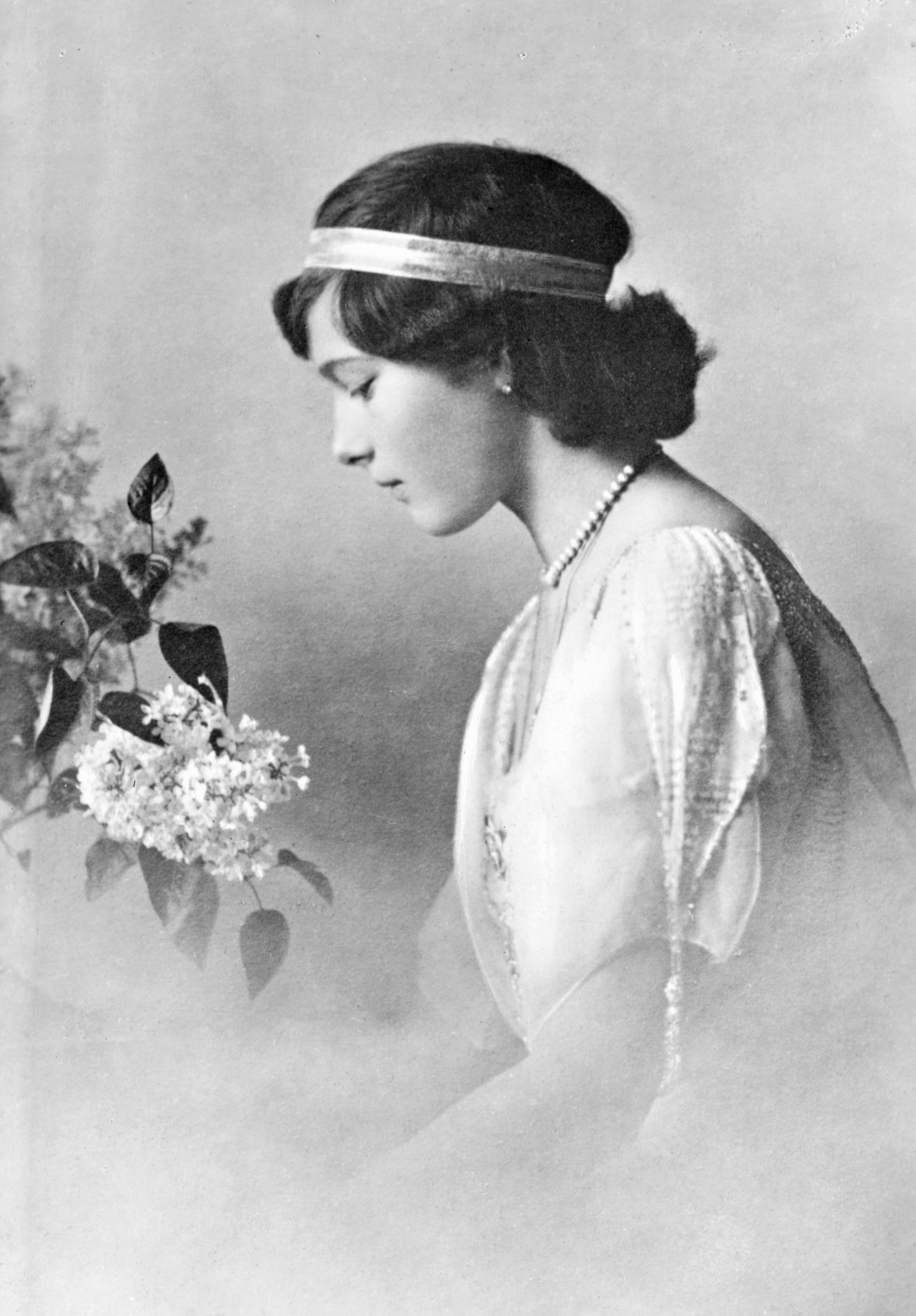
Grand Duchess Tatiana, 1914

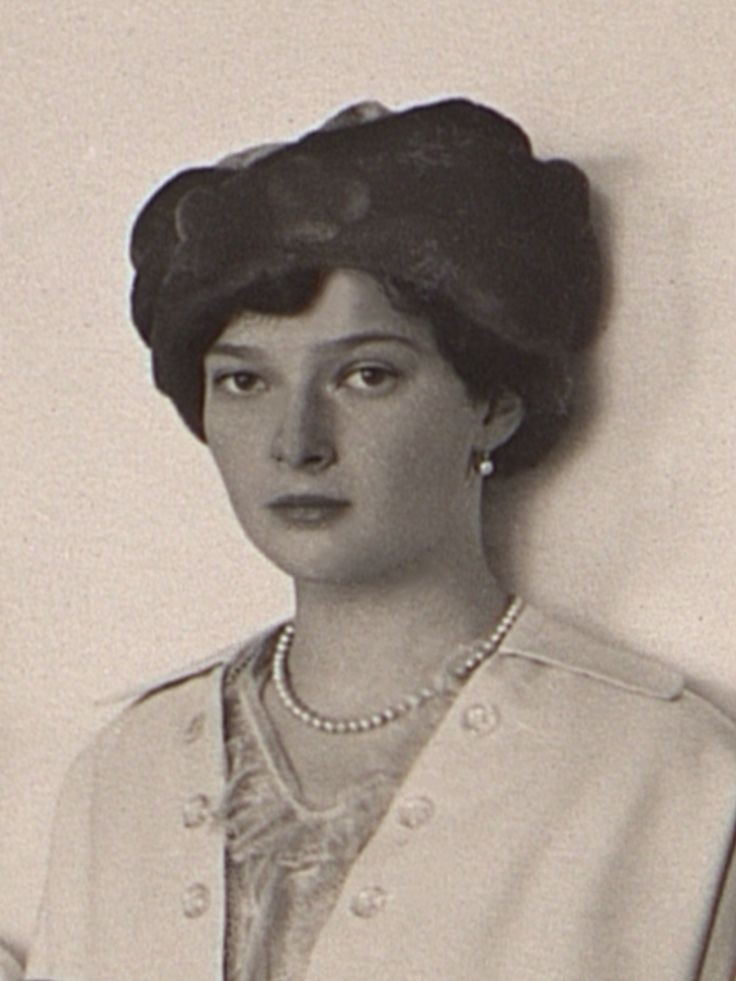
Grand Duchess Tatiana Nikolaevna of Russia, 1915

Tatiana was a famous beauty. She was tall, slender, and elegant. She had dark auburn hair, gray eyes, and fine features. Many viewed her as the most beautiful of the four grand duchesses and the one who resembled their mother most. Her mother's lady-in-waiting Baroness Sophie Buxhoeveden reflected that "Tatiana was, to my mind, prettier than her sisters. She was taller than her mother, but so thin and so well built that her height was not a hindrance to her attractiveness. She had beautiful, regular features, and resembled some of the famous beauties among her royal relatives, whose family portraits decorated the walls of the palace.. She had dark hair, a rather pale complexion, and wide-apart eyes, that gave her a poetic far-away look." General Count Alexander Grabbe, wrote that "the prettiest of the Grand Duchesses was Tatiana, the Tsar's second daughter. In her physical appearance and her serious and ardent nature, she most resembled her mother. Slender with auburn hair and clear gray eyes, she was strikingly good looking and enjoyed the attention her beauty commanded." According to Anna Vyrubova, "when Tatiana grew up, she was the tallest and most graceful of all the Grand Duchesses, beautiful and romantic. Many officers fell in love with Tatiana, but there were no appropriate suitors for her." Meriel Buchanan described her beauty as "almost mystical." Alexander Mossolov, head of the Imperial Chancellery, wrote that Tatiana was "the best-looking of all the sisters." Grand Duke Alexander Mikhailovich of Russia called her "the leading beauty of the family". Her nanny Margaretta Eagar wrote that she was "a very pretty child, remarkably like her mother, but delicate in appearance." In 1900, the British magazine, Woman at Home, wrote that "the flower of the flock, as far as looks are concerned ... is Grand Duchess Tatiana." Nicholas wrote that Tatiana was "a very beautiful child" and he often remarked that she reminded him of Alexandra. When she was 8, her tutor Pierre Gilliard said that she "was prettier than her sister."

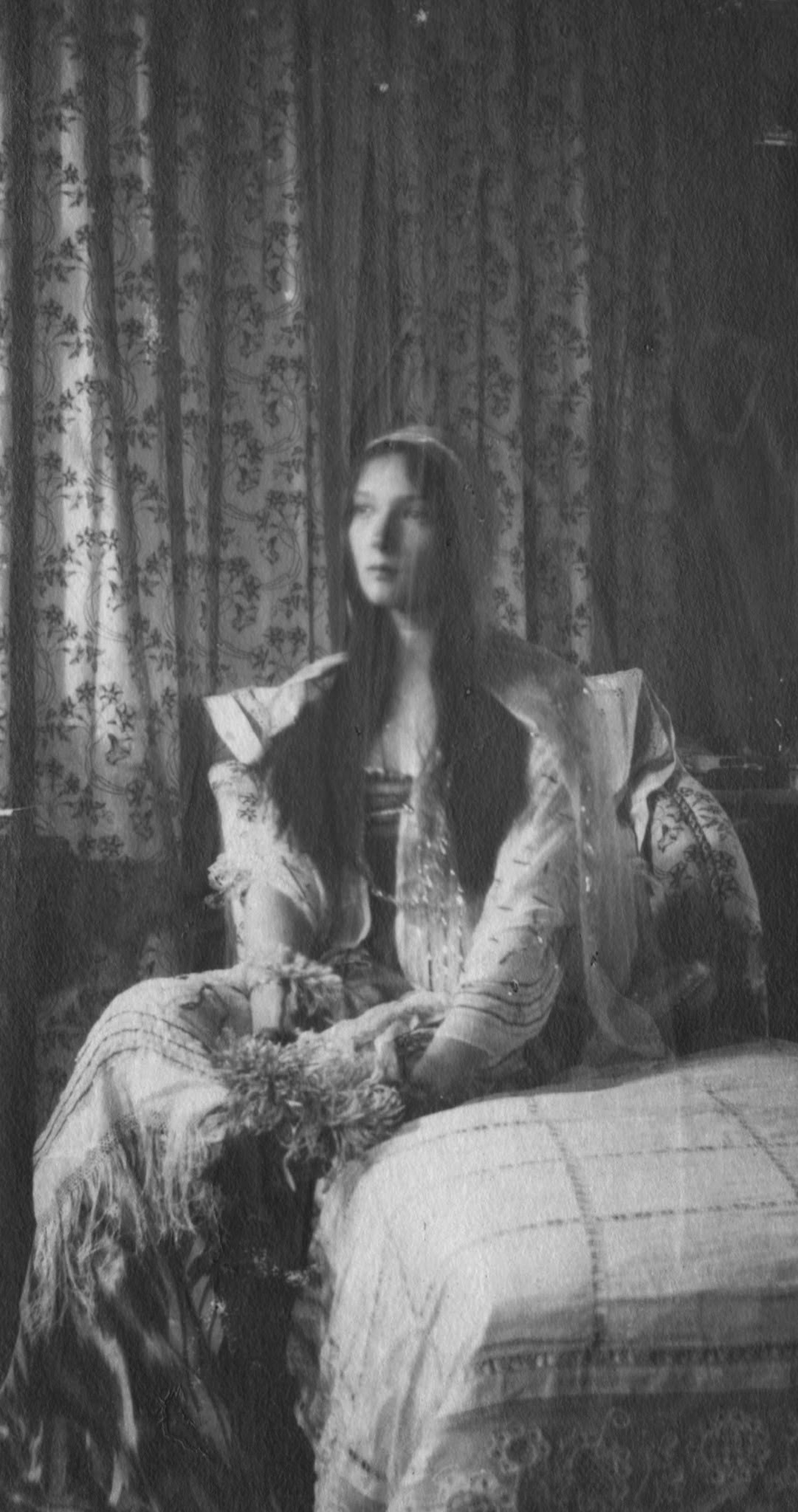
Grand Duchess Tatiana in a costume, 1916

Despite her high status, Tatiana did not use her Imperial title and her friends, family, and servants called her by her first name and patronym, Tatiana Nikolaevna. The only nicknames that can be found for her using primary sources are 'Tanechka' in a postcard from her cousin Princess Irina Alexandrovna, and 'Tan'ka' in some notes from her sister, Anastasia Nikolaevna. According to one story, Tatiana kicked her lady-in-waiting Baroness Sophie Buxhoeveden for addressing her as "Your Imperial Highness" during a committee meeting, and she hissed, "Are you crazy to speak to me like that?" When she was 14, Tatiana called Chebotareva at her home on the telephone, and she spoke first to Chebotareva's 16-year-old son. Unaware of her identity, Gregory asked her to identify herself. She replied, "Tatiana Nikolaevna". He could not believe that he was speaking to a grand duchess, and he repeated his question. Again, Tatiana did not claim the imperial title of Grand Duchess and replied that she was "Sister Romanova the Second".

Tatiana was a practical, nurturing leader. Her sisters gave her the nickname "The Governess" and sent her as their group representative when they wanted their parents to grant a favour. Olga was 18 months older than Tatiana, but she uncomplainingly allowed Tatiana to be the leader of their group. Baroness Sophie Buxhoeveden recalled that "It was Tatiana Nicolaevna who took care of the little ones, and who was a constant help to the Household, always willing to help them in arranging that their official duties should not clash with their private engagements."

Gilliard wrote that Tatiana was reserved and "well balanced" but less open and spontaneous than Olga. She was less naturally intelligent than Olga, but she was more hard-working and dedicated. Colonel Eugene Kobylinsky, the family's guard at Tsarskoye Selo and Tobolsk, claimed that Tatiana "had no liking for art" and that "it would have been better for her had she been a man."

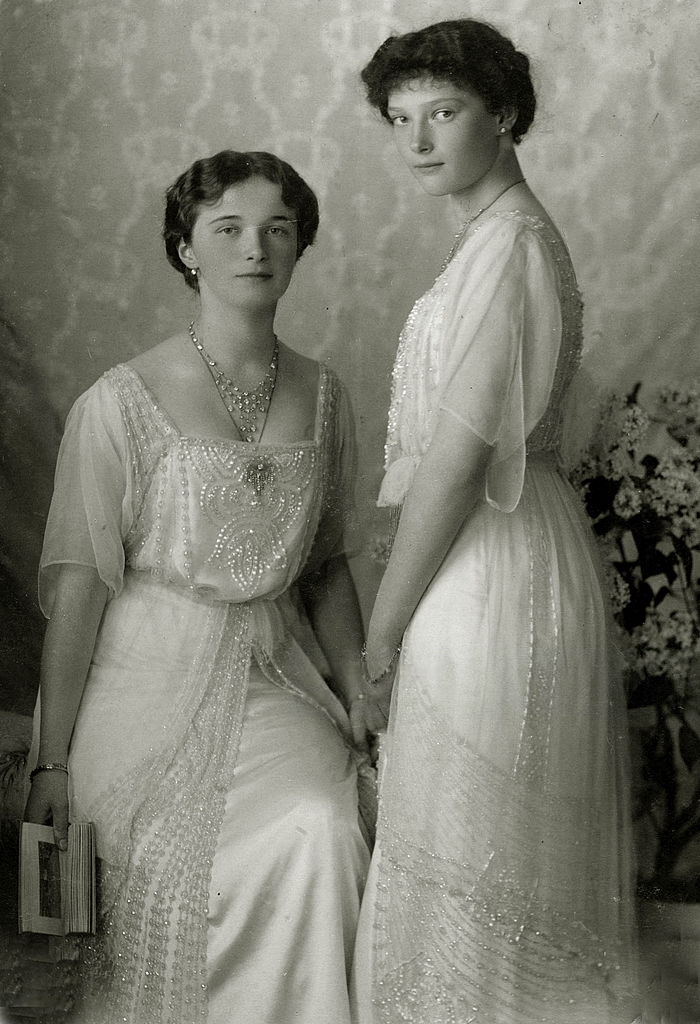
Grand Duchess Olga Nikolaevna of Russia and Grand Duchess Tatiana Nikolaevna of Russia in 1913

Tatiana was interested in fashion. According to Sophie Buxhoeveden, "Tatiana Nicolaevna loved dress. Any frock, no matter how old, looked well on her. She knew how to put on her clothes, was admired and liked admiration." Her mother's friend Anna Vyrubova wrote that Tatiana was talented in embroidery and crocheting and that she could dress her mother's hair as well as a professional hair stylist. Sophie Buxhoeveden remembered that Tatiana once dressed her hair when her hairdresser was unavailable.

Tatiana was the most sociable of the four sisters. According to Sophie Buxhoeveden, "friends would have been welcome, but no young girls were ever asked to the Palace." Vyrubova noted that Tatiana was the most famous of the sisters in their lifetimes because of her vivacious personality and sense of duty. Vyrubova and Lili Dehn claimed that Tatiana longed for friends of her own age but that her high rank and her mother's distaste for society restricted her social life.

Like her mother, Tatiana was deeply religious. She read her Bible frequently, studied theology, and struggled with the meaning of "good and evil, sorrow and forgiveness, and man's destiny on earth". She decided that "one has to struggle much because the return for good is evil, and evil reigns." A.A. Mosolov claimed that Tatiana's reserved nature gave her a "difficult" character with more spiritual depth than that of her sister, Olga. Her English tutor, Sydney Gibbes, claimed that Tatiana viewed religion as a duty rather than a passion.

Only her closest friends and family were aware of her introspective side. "With her, as with her mother, shyness and reserve were accounted as pride, but, once you knew her and had gained her affection, this reserve disappeared and the real Tatiana became apparent," Dehn recalled. "She was a poetical creature, always yearning for the ideal, and dreaming of great friendships which might be hers." Chebotareva loved the "sweet" Tatiana as if she were her daughter, and she claimed that Tatiana would hold her hand when she was nervous. "I am so terribly embarrassed and frightened – I do not know whom I greeted and whom not," Tatiana told Chebotareva.

Like her sisters, Tatiana was unworldly and naive. When she was young, she was shocked to learn that her governess Margaretta Eagar was paid for taking care of her. When Eagar told her that "you have seen me get my money every month," Tatiana replied that "I always thought it was a present to you." When her lady-in-waiting sent a carriage without an attendant, Tatiana and Olga decided to go shopping for the first time. They ordered the carriage to stop near a group of shops and went into one of the stores. The shopkeepers did not recognize them because they wore nurses' uniforms. They left the shop without buying anything, because they didn't carry money with them and had no idea how to use it. The next day, they asked Chebotareva how to use money.

French tutor Pierre Gilliard wrote that Tatiana and Olga were "passionately devoted to one another."

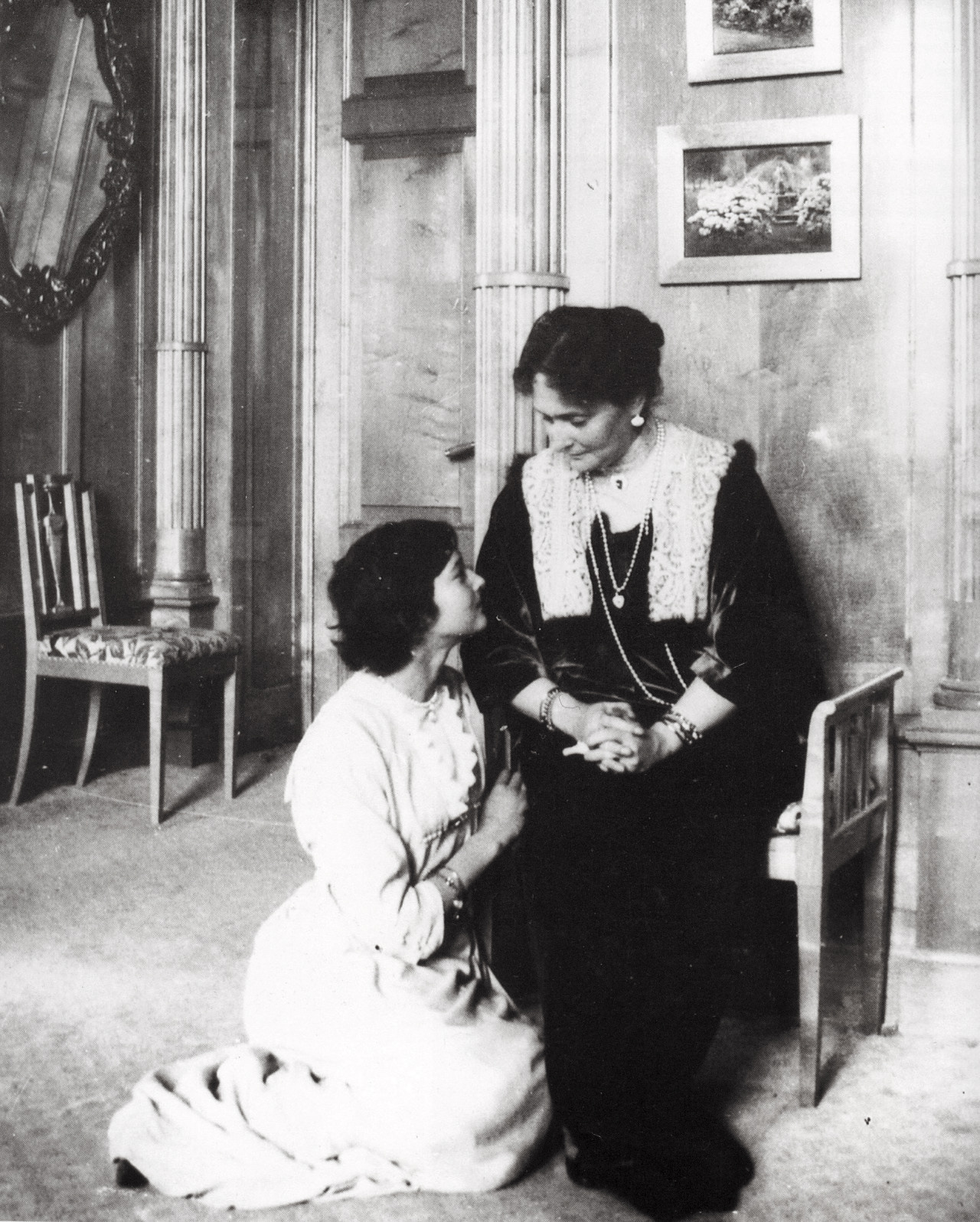
Tatiana with her mother, 1914

Tatiana was closer to her mother than any of her sisters, and many considered her to be Alexandra's favorite daughter. "It was not that her sisters loved their mother any less," recalled her French tutor Pierre Gilliard, "but Tatiana knew how to surround her with unwearying attentions and never gave way to her own capricious impulses." On 13 March 1916, Alexandra wrote to Nicholas that Tatiana was the only one of their four daughters who "grasped it" when she explained her way of looking at things. Baroness Sophie Buxhoeveden wrote that Tatiana "was closest in sympathy to her mother" and "the definite favorite of both her parents."

Tatiana was close to her father. Lili Dehn wrote that "the Emperor loved her devotedly [and] they had much in common." She recalled that "the sisters used to laugh, and say that, if a favour were required, "Tatiana must ask Papa to grant it.""

== Early life ==
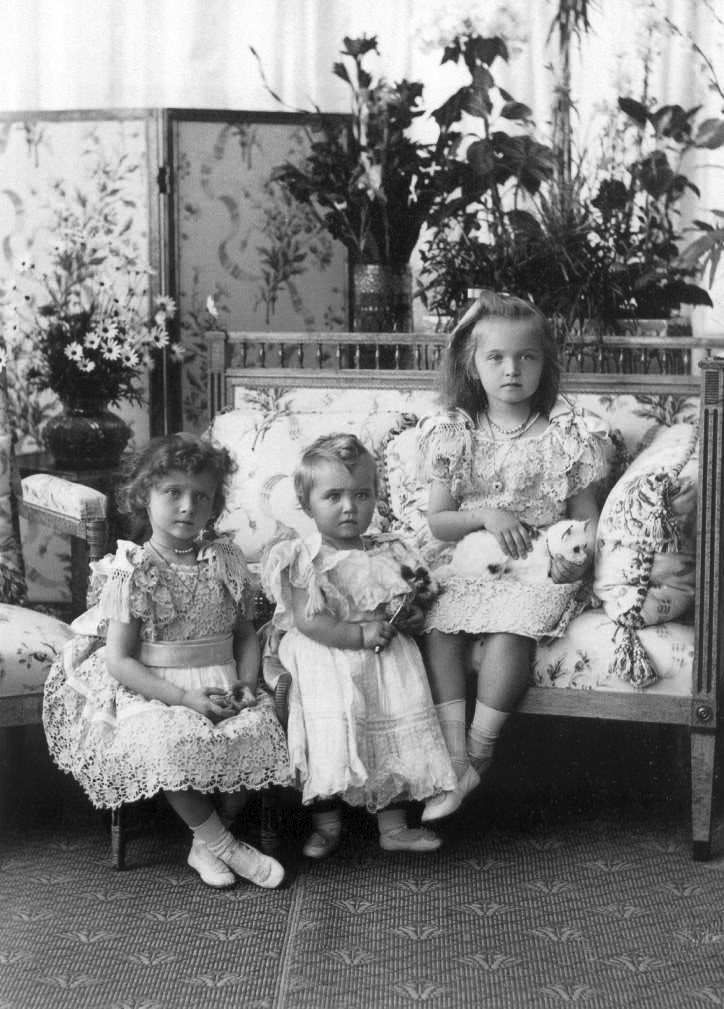
Grand Duchesses Tatiana, Maria and Olga in a formal portrait taken in 1900

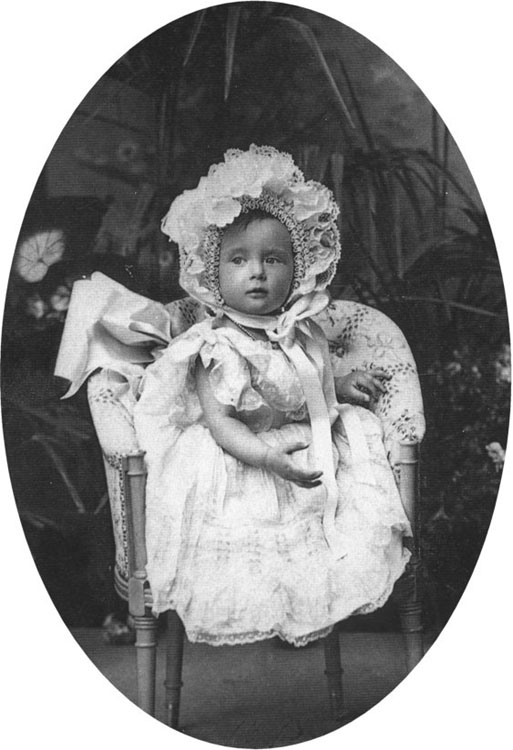
Baby Tatiana in a bonnet, 1898

Tatiana was born on 10 June 1897. She was the second child of Emperor Nicholas II and Empress Alexandra. She weighed 3.9 kg at birth, and Dr. Ott used forceps in her birth. When she regained consciousness from the chloroform used during the delivery, Alexandra saw the "anxious and troubled faces" around her and wept: "My God, it is again a daughter. What will the nation say, what will the nation say?" Grand Duke Konstantin Konstantinovich wrote that "everyone was very disappointed as they had been hoping for a son." Grand Duke George Alexandrovich, Nicholas' younger brother, told Nicholas "I was already preparing to go into retirement, but it was not to be." Under the Pauline Laws, the Imperial throne of Russia could not pass to a woman unless all legitimate male lines died out. As such, Nicholas' heir was his brother George unless he had a son. Grand Duchess Tatiana's siblings were Grand Duchesses Olga, Maria, Anastasia, and Tsarevich Alexei of Russia. All of the children were close to one another and to their parents up until the end of their lives.

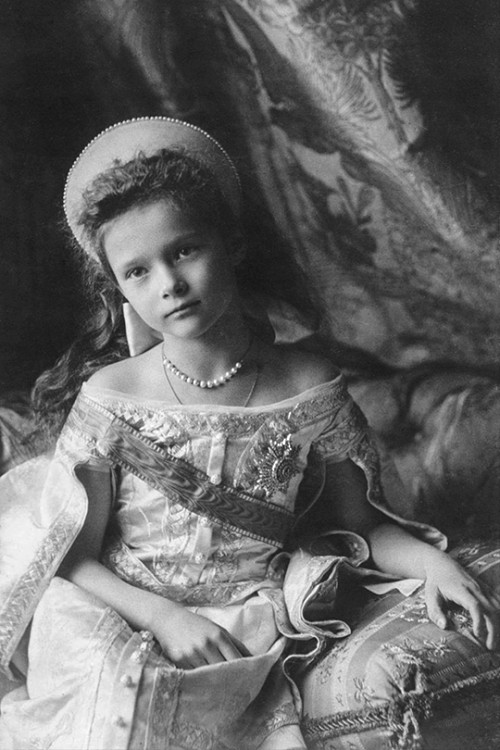
Grand Duchess Tatiana Nikolaevna at her brother's christening, 1904.

On 29 May 1897, Grand Duke Konstantin Konstantinovich of Russia recorded in his diary that Nicholas II had named Tatiana as an homage to the heroine in Alexander Pushkin's novel in verse Eugene Onegin. According to him, he wanted to name his daughter after Olga and Tatiana, the sisters in the famous poem. Tatiana's title was "Grand Princess", but it was translated from Russian into English as "Grand Duchess".

Like the other Romanov children, Tatiana was raised with austerity. She and her sisters slept on camp beds without pillows, took cold baths in the morning, and embroidered and knitted projects to be given as gifts or sold at charity bazaars.

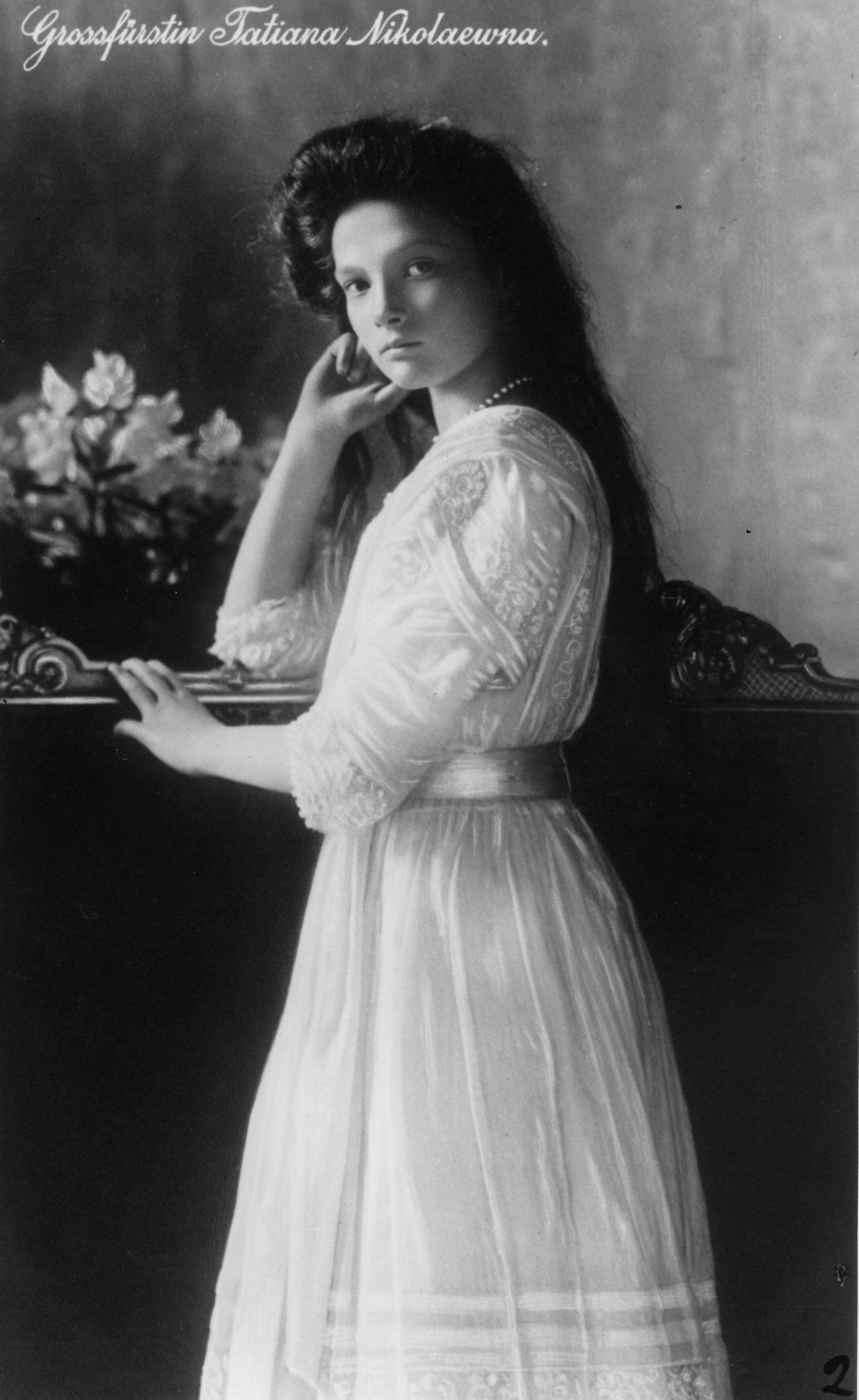
Formal portrait of Grand Duchess Tatiana, 1910

In their household, Tatiana and Olga were known as "The Big Pair". They shared a bedroom and were very close to each another from early childhood. In the spring of 1901, Olga had typhoid fever and was confined to the nursery for several weeks. When she began to recover, Tatiana was permitted to see her older sister for five minutes but didn't recognize her. When her governess, Margaretta Eagar, told her that the sickly child was Olga, four-year-old Tatiana cried bitterly and protested that the pale, thin child couldn't be her beloved older sister. Eagar had difficulty persuading Tatiana that Olga would recover.

== Relationship with Grigori Rasputin ==
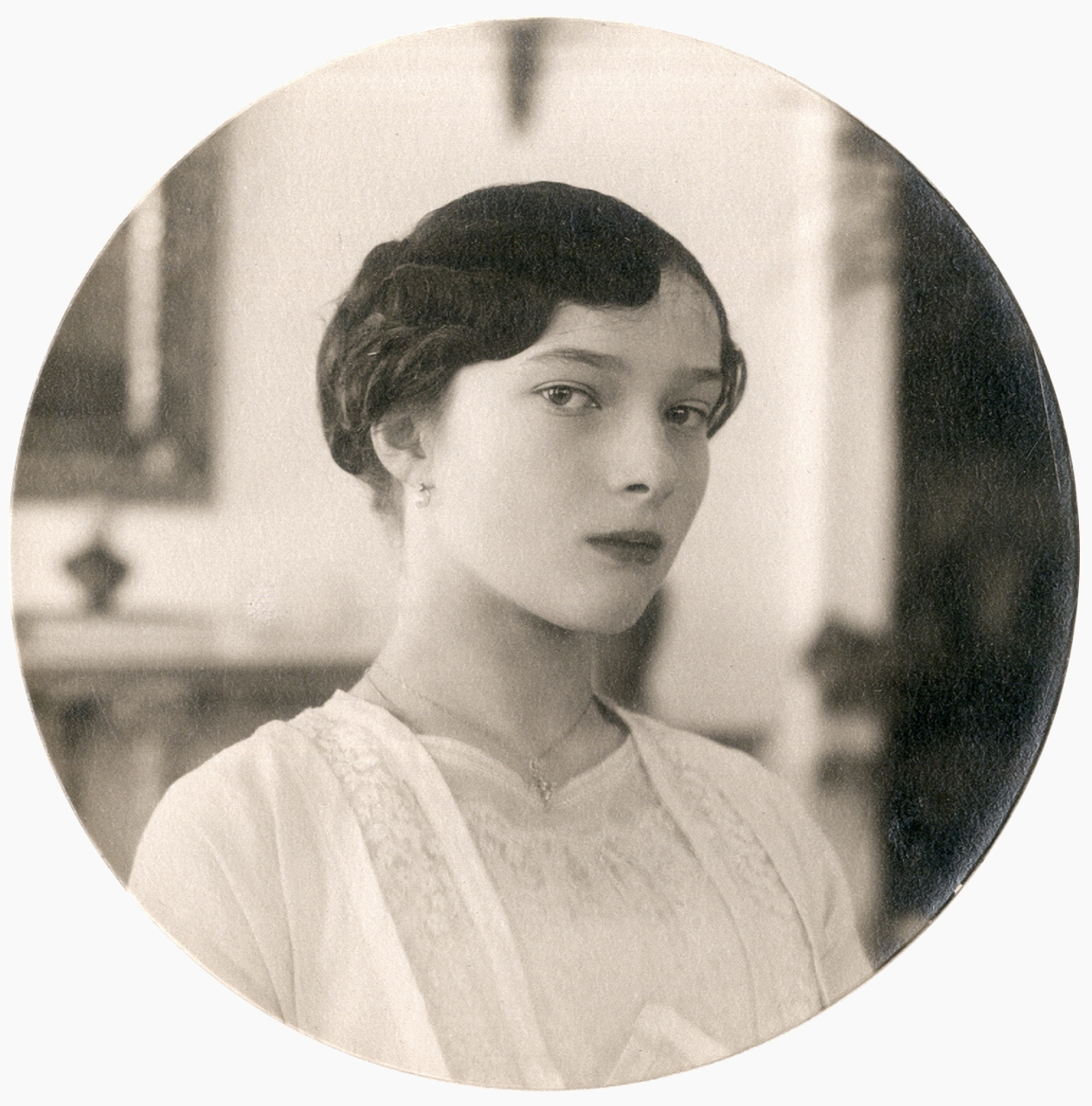
Photo taken of Grand Duchess Tatiana, 1914 by Eugene Fabergé

Tatiana doted on her younger brother, Tsarevich Alexei. However, the long-awaited heir had frequent, severe attacks of hemophilia. Tatiana, her mother, and her three sisters were all potential carriers of the hemophilia gene; the Tsarina was a granddaughter of Queen Victoria, who had passed down the hemophilia gene to her descendants. Tatiana's paternal aunt Grand Duchess Olga Alexandrovna of Russia reported that Maria, Tatiana's younger sister, hemorrhaged during an operation to remove her tonsils in December 1914. The operating doctor was so alarmed that the Tsarina needed to urge him to continue. Olga Alexandrovna claimed that all four of her nieces bled more than was normal and that they were carriers of the hemophilia gene. Symptomatic carriers of the gene are not hemophiliacs, but they can have symptoms of hemophilia, including an abnormally low blood clotting factor that can lead to heavy bleeding.

The Tsarina relied on the counsel of Grigori Rasputin, a Russian peasant and wandering starets or "holy man", and she credited his prayers with saving the ailing Tsarevich. Tatiana and her siblings viewed Rasputin as "Our Friend" and confided in him. In the autumn of 1907, Tatiana's father escorted his sister, Grand Duchess Olga Alexandrovna of Russia, to the nursery so that she could too meet Rasputin. Tatiana and her siblings all wore their long white nightgowns, and they were comfortable in Rasputin's presence. In February 1909, Rasputin sent the Imperial children a telegram, advising them to "Love the whole of God's nature, the whole of His creation in particular this earth. The Mother of God was always occupied with flowers and needlework." In one letter, 11-year-old Tatiana asked Rasputin to visit her and lamented that she found it difficult to see her mother ill. "But you know because you know everything," she wrote.

Sofia Ivanovna Tyutcheva, one of the sisters' governesses, was horrified that Rasputin was permitted access to the nursery when they were in their nightgowns and requested that he be banned from the household. She told Grand Duchess Xenia that he visited Olga and Tatiana before them, spoke to them, and "caressed" them. The sisters hid Rasputin's presence from Tyutcheva, and they were afraid to talk to their governess about him. Tatiana was aware of the tension and feared her mother's reaction to Tyutcheva's actions. On 8 March 1910, the 12-year-old Tatiana wrote to her mother, "I am so afr(aid) that S.I. can speak ... about our friend something bad. I hope our nurse will be nice to our friend now." Despite the conflict Tyutcheva remained in her position as governess until 1912.

All accounts agree that Rasputin had an innocent relationship with the children, but Nicholas did ask Rasputin to avoid going to the nurseries in the future. Grand Duchess Xenia was horrified by Tyutcheva's story. On 15 March 1910, she wrote in her diary that she could not understand why her brother and his family regarded Rasputin, whom she saw as only a "khlyst", as "almost a saint".

Maria Ivanovna Vishnyakova, another nurse for the royal children, initially thought well of Rasputin, but she became disillusioned with him. In the spring of 1910, she claimed that Rasputin raped her, but the Tsarina refused to believe her because she saw Rasputin as holy. The Tsarina insisted to Grand Duchess Olga Alexandrovna that she had investigated Vishnyakova's claim but that "they caught the young woman in bed with a Cossack of the Imperial Guard." In 1913, the Tsarina dismissed Vishnyakova.

There were malicious rumors that Rasputin had seduced the Tsarina and the four grand duchesses. Rasputin had released the letters that the Tsarina and the grand duchesses had sent to him; although they were innocent in nature, they fueled the rumors about his alleged affairs. Pornographic cartoons depicted Rasputin having sexual relations with the Tsarina and her four daughters as Anna Vyrubova stood nude in the background. Much to the Tsarina's displeasure, Nicholas ordered Rasputin to leave St. Petersburg, and Rasputin went on a pilgrimage to Palestine. The Imperial family's association with Rasputin continued until his murder in 1916. On 6 December 1916, the Tsarina wrote to Nicholas that "Our Friend is so contented with our girlies, says they have gone through heavy 'courses' for their age and their souls have much developed."

After his death rumors spread that Tatiana was present at Rasputin's murder, "disguised as a lieutenant of the Chevaliers-Gardes, so that she could revenge herself on Rasputin who had tried to violate her." Maurice Paléologue, the French ambassador to Russia, wrote of a rumor that Tatiana had witnessed Rasputin's castration, but that he doubted the credibility of such a claim.

In his memoirs, A.A. Mordvinov reported that all four grand duchesses were "cold and visibly terribly upset" by Rasputin's death. According to him, they sat "huddled up closely together" on a sofa when they received the news. He wrote that they seemed to sense the political upheaval that was about to be unleashed. On 21 December 1916, Tatiana attended Rasputin's funeral. Rasputin was buried with an icon signed on its reverse side by Tatiana, her mother and her sisters.

Tatiana kept a notebook in which she recorded Rasputin's sayings: "Love is Light and it has no end. Love is great suffering. It cannot eat, it cannot sleep. It is mixed with sin in equal parts. And yet it is better to love. In love one can be mistaken, and through suffering he expiates for his mistakes. If love is strong—the lovers happy. Nature herself and the Lord give them happiness. One must ask the Lord that he teach to love the luminous, bright, so that love be not torment, but joy. Love pure, Love luminous is the Sun. The Sun makes us warm, and Love caresses. All is in Love, and even a bullet cannot strike Love down."

== Young adulthood and World War I ==
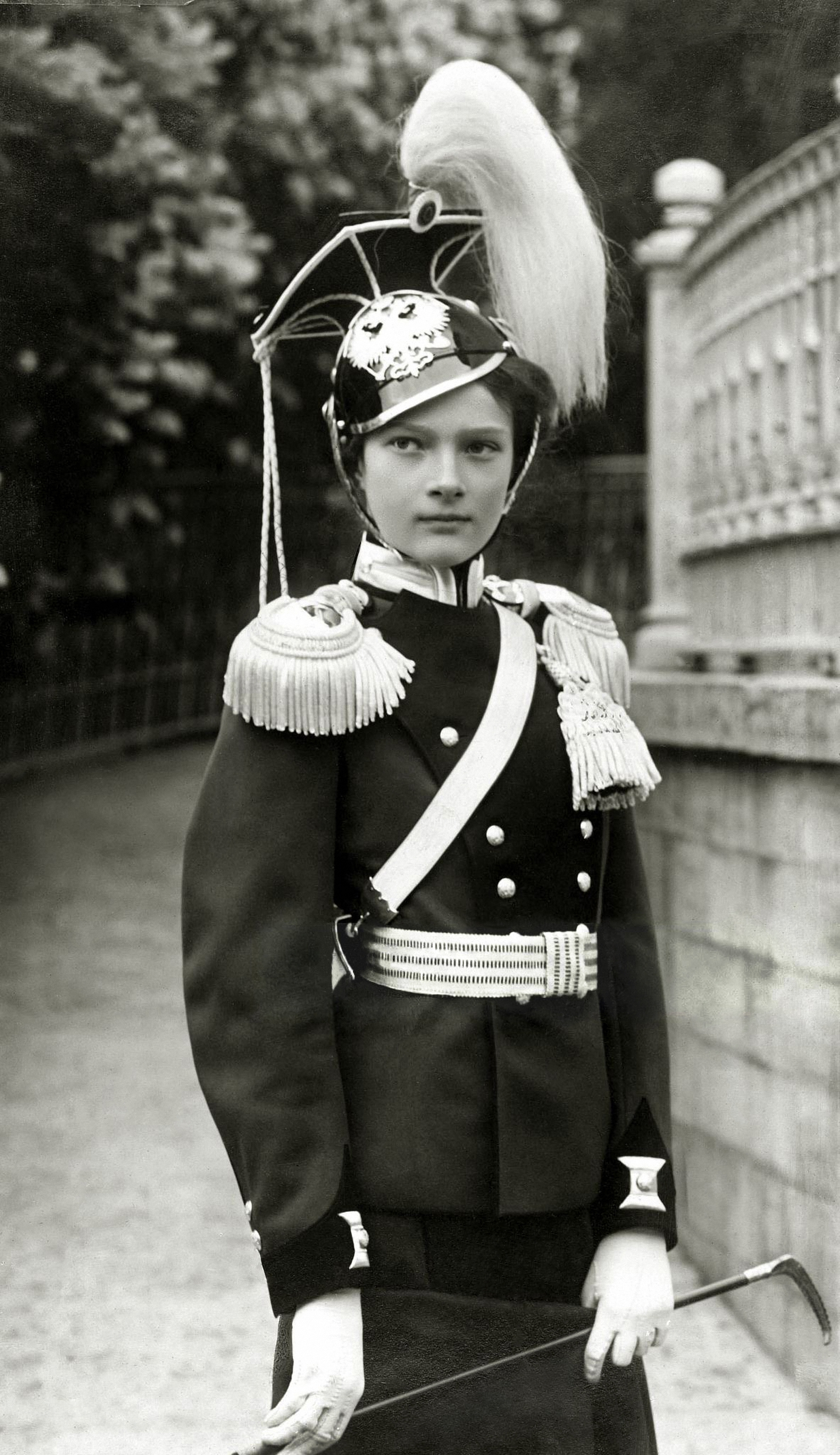
Grand Duchess Tatiana Nikolaevna as honorary Colonel of the 8th Vosnesenski Lancers

As a young teenager, Tatiana was given the rank of honorary colonel and assigned a regiment of soldiers, the Vosnesensky (Ascension) Lancers. She and Olga inspected the soldiers regularly.

Tatiana enjoyed the company of soldiers, but she was often shocked by their behavior. On 11 July 1911, a group of officers aboard the Imperial yacht gave Olga a portrait of Michelangelo's nude David, cut out from a newspaper. Indignant, the 14-year-old Tatiana wrote to her aunt Grand Duchess Olga Alexandrovna of Russia, "Olga laughed at it long and hard. And not one of the officers wishes to confess that he has done it. Such swine, aren't they?"

On 14 July 1911, Tatiana laughed at her distant cousin Prince Ioann Konstantinovich of Russia's engagement to Helen of Serbia. On 14 July 1911, she wrote to Olga, "How funny if they might have children, can (she) be kissing him? What foul, fie!"

In 1911, Tatiana and Olga witnessed the assassination of the government minister Pyotr Stolypin during a performance at the Kiev Opera House. On 10 September 1911, Nicholas later wrote to his mother, Dowager Empress Maria, that the event had upset both girls. Tatiana sobbed and both of them had trouble sleeping that night.

When World War I broke out, Tatiana became a Red Cross nurse with her mother and Olga. They cared for wounded soldiers in a private hospital on the grounds of Tsarskoye Selo. According to Vyrubova, "Tatiana was almost as skillful and devoted as her mother, and complained only that on account of her youth she was spared some of the more trying cases." Valentina Ivanovna Chebotareva, who worked with her at the hospital, described in her journal how she planned to boil silk while Tatiana was otherwise occupied, fearing that Tatiana would be too tired to help her. But Tatiana guessed what Chebotareva was doing. "Why can you breathe carbolic acid and I can't?" she asked Chebotareva and insisted on helping her with the work. In September 1914, she was named patron of a war aid committee called the Tatiana Committee. Tatiana was fiercely patriotic. On 29 October 1914, she apologized to her mother for disparaging the Germans in her presence; she explained that she thought of her mother as only Russian and that she had forgotten that the Tsarina was born in Germany. The Tsarina responded that she was offended by the Russian people's gossip about her German connections because she considered herself as completely Russian.

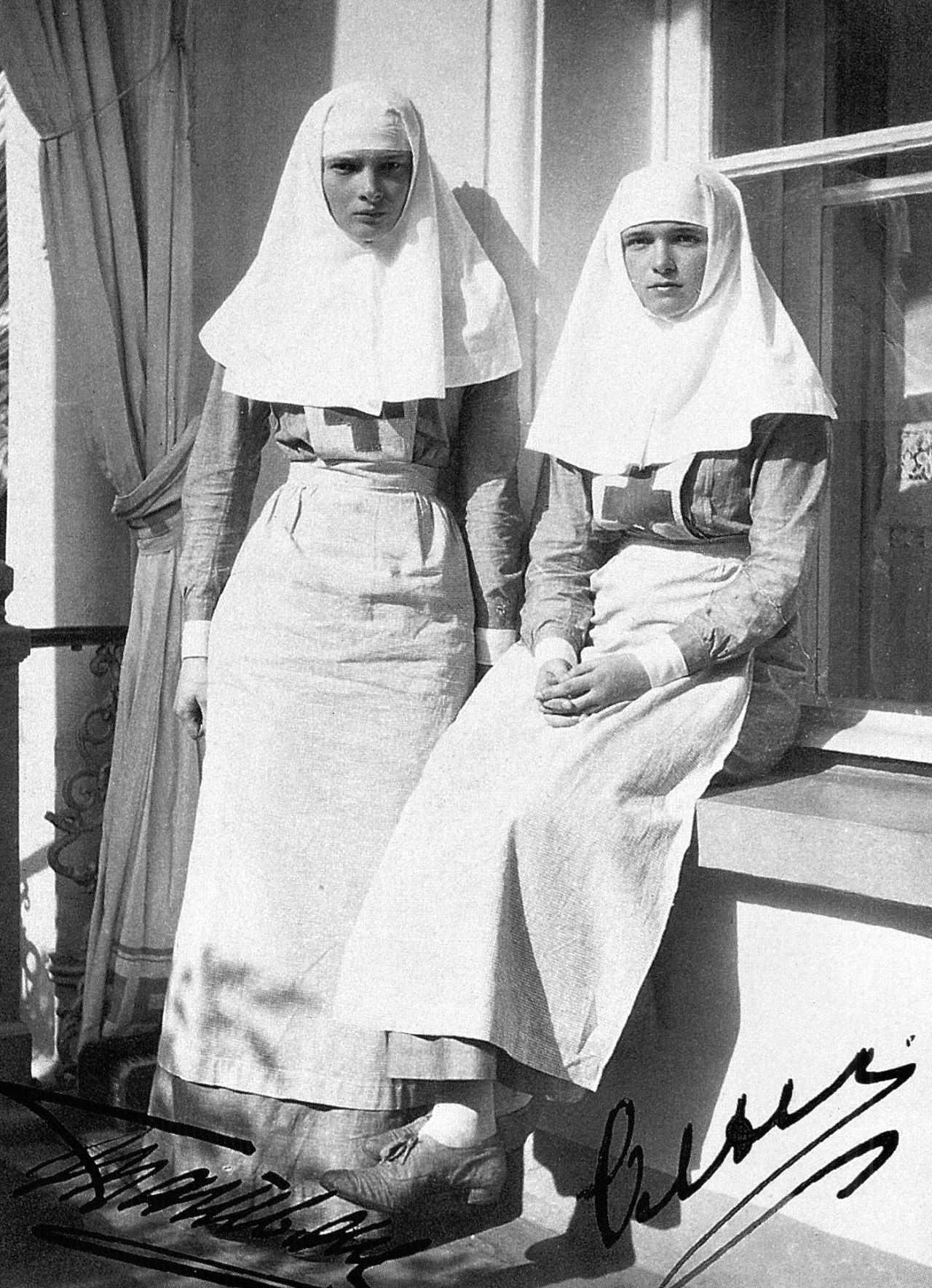
Grand Duchesses Tatiana and Olga Nikolaevna of Russia as nurses, 1916

On 15 August 1915, Tatiana wrote to her mother that she wished she could do more to support Russia during the war: "I simply can't tell you how awfully sorry I am for you, my beloved ones. I am so sorry I can in no way help you or be useful. In such moments I am sorry I'm not a man."

=== Romances with soldiers ===
When she was 13, an ill Tatiana begged her mother to permit her to leave her bed so that she could watch a soldier, with whom she was infatuated. On 20 April 1911, she wrote to the Tsarina, "I would like so much to go the review of the second division as I am also the second daughter and Olga was at the first so now it is my turn...Yes, Mama, and at the second division I will see whom I must see ... you know whom ...".

In the December 2004 edition of the magazine Royalty Digest: A Journal of Record, Peter de Malama wrote that his cousin, Dmitri Yakovlevich Malama, an officer in the Imperial Russian Cavalry, met Tatiana when he was wounded in 1914. De Malama claimed that Dmitri was appointed an equerry to the court of the Tsar at Tsarskoye Selo, where he developed a romantic relationship with Tatiana. In September 1914, Dmitri gave Tatiana a French bulldog, which she named "Ortipo". On 30 September 1914, she wrote to her mother, "Forgive me about the little dog. To say the truth, when he asked should I like to have it if he gave it to me, I at once said yes. You remember, I always wanted to have one, and only afterwards when we came home I thought that suddenly you might not like me having one. But I really was so pleased at the idea that I forgot about everything." When Ortipo died, Dmitri gave her another puppy. Tatiana took it with her to Yekaterinburg, where it died with the rest of the family. Eighteen months after he gave Ortipo to Tatiana, Dmitri paid the Imperial family a visit. On 17 March 1916, the Tsarina wrote to Nicholas that "my little Malama came for an hour yesterday evening...Looks flourishing more of a man now, an adorable boy still. I must say a perfect son in law he w(ou)ld have been – why are foreign P(rin)ces not as nice!" In August 1919, Malama was killed while commanding a unit of the White Russians fighting the civil war against the Bolsheviks in Ukraine, according to Peter de Malama.

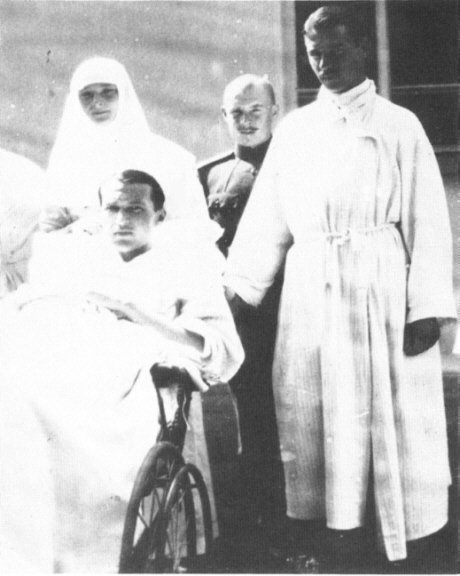
Grand Duchess Tatiana Nikolaevna wearing a Red Cross nursing uniform and Dmitri Yakovlevich Malama

According to the diary of Valentina Ivanovna Chebotareva, Tatiana was fond of an officer named Vladimir Kiknadze, whom she cared for when he was wounded in 1915 and 1916. She claimed that Tatiana sat beside "Volodia" at the piano as he played a tune with one finger and talked to her in a low voice. She claimed that Tatiana and Olga made excuses to come to the hospital to see Volodia. She feared that the grand duchesses' flirtations with the wounded officers would damage their reputations.

=== Negotiations for marriage ===
Allegedly, the Serbian king Peter I wanted Tatiana as a bride for his younger son, Prince Alexander. In January 1914, the Serbian prime minister Nikola Pašić delivered a letter to Tsar Nicholas in which King Peter expressed a desire for his son to marry one of the Grand Duchesses. Nicholas replied that he would allow his daughters to decide whom to marry, but he noticed that the Serbian prince Alexander often gazed upon Tatiana during family dinners on his recent trips to St. Petersburg. There were also reports that the Windsors wanted to marry her to the Prince of Wales, with the future Edward VIII insisting he was impressed by her beauty and the way she tended to her younger brother. She was too young for her parents to seriously consider her marriage when potential suitors first surfaced, and negotiations ended due to the outbreak of World War I.

== Captivity ==
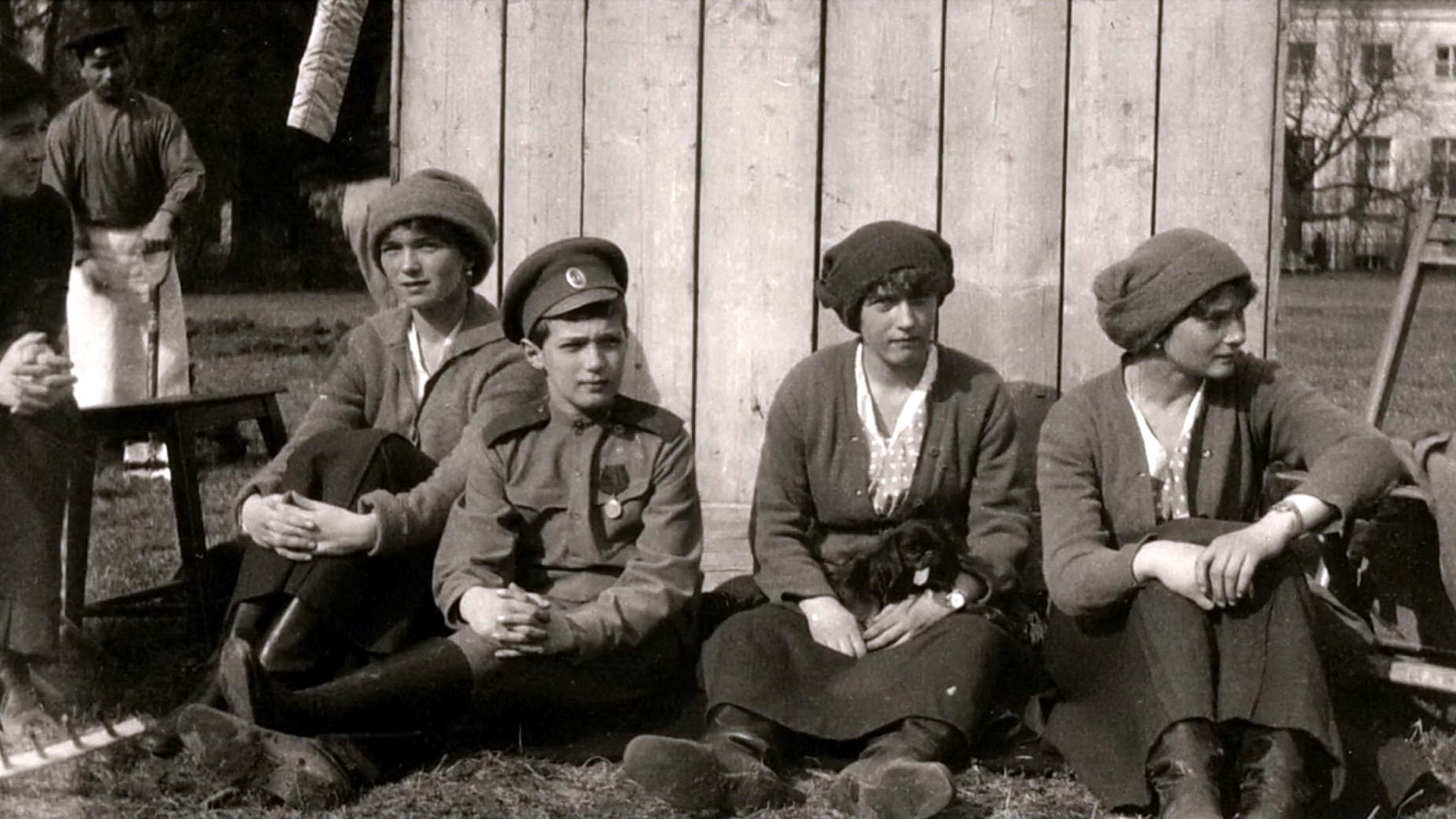
Olga, Alexei, Anastasia and Tatiana in Alexander Park, Tsarskoye Selo, May 1917

The family was arrested during the Russian Revolution of 1917 and imprisoned first at Tsarskoye Selo and later at private residences in Tobolsk and Yekaterinburg, Siberia. The drastic change in circumstances and the uncertainty of captivity took its toll on Tatiana as well as on the rest of her family. "She pines without work," wrote her fellow nurse Valentina Chebotareva after receiving a letter from Tatiana on 16 April 1917. "It is strange to sit in the morning at home, to be in good health and not to go to the change of bandages!" Tatiana wrote Chebotareva. Tatiana, apparently trying to advocate for her mother, asked her friend Margarita Khitrovo in a letter on 8 May 1917 why their fellow nurses did not write to Tsarina Alexandra directly. Chebotareva wrote in her journal that, while she pitied the family, she could not write directly to the Tsarina because she blamed her for the Revolution. "If anyone wishes to write us, let them write directly," Tatiana wrote to "my dear dove" Chebotareva on 9 December 1917, after expressing concern for fellow nurses and a patient they had once treated together. Chebotareva's son, Gregory P. Tschebotarioff, noted the grand duchess's "firm, energetic handwriting" and how the letter "reflected the nature which endeared her so much to my mother."

Tatiana's English tutor, Sydney Gibbes, recalled that Tatiana had grown razor thin in captivity and seemed "haughtier" and more inscrutable to him than ever. In April 1918 the Bolsheviks moved Nicholas, Alexandra and Maria to Yekaterinburg. The remaining children remained behind in Tobolsk because Alexei, who had had another attack of haemophilia, could not be moved. It was Tatiana who persuaded her mother to "stop tormenting herself" and make a decision to go with her father and leave Alexei behind. Alexandra decided that level-headed Tatiana must be left behind to manage the household and look after Alexei.

During the month of separation from their parents and sister, Tatiana, Olga, Anastasia, and ladies in waiting busied themselves sewing precious stones and jewelry into their clothing, hoping to hide them from their captors, since Alexandra had written she, Nicholas and Maria had been heavily searched upon arrival in Yekaterinburg, and items confiscated. A letter from Anna Demidova to Alexandra Tegleva gave the instructions on how to deal with the 'medicines', a predetermined code name for the jewels. The concealments were successful, as the Bolsheviks were never aware of the jewels in the clothes until after the executions.

Pierre Gilliard later recalled his last sight of the imperial children at Yekaterinburg. "The sailor Nagorny, who attended to Alexei Nikolaevitch, passed my window carrying the sick boy in his arms, behind him came the Grand Duchesses loaded with valises and small personal belongings. I tried to get out, but was roughly pushed back into the carriage by the sentry. I came back to the window. Tatiana Nikolayevna came last carrying her little dog and struggling to drag a heavy brown valise. It was raining and I saw her feet sink into the mud at every step. Nagorny tried to come to her assistance; he was roughly pushed back by one of the commisars ..."

== Death ==
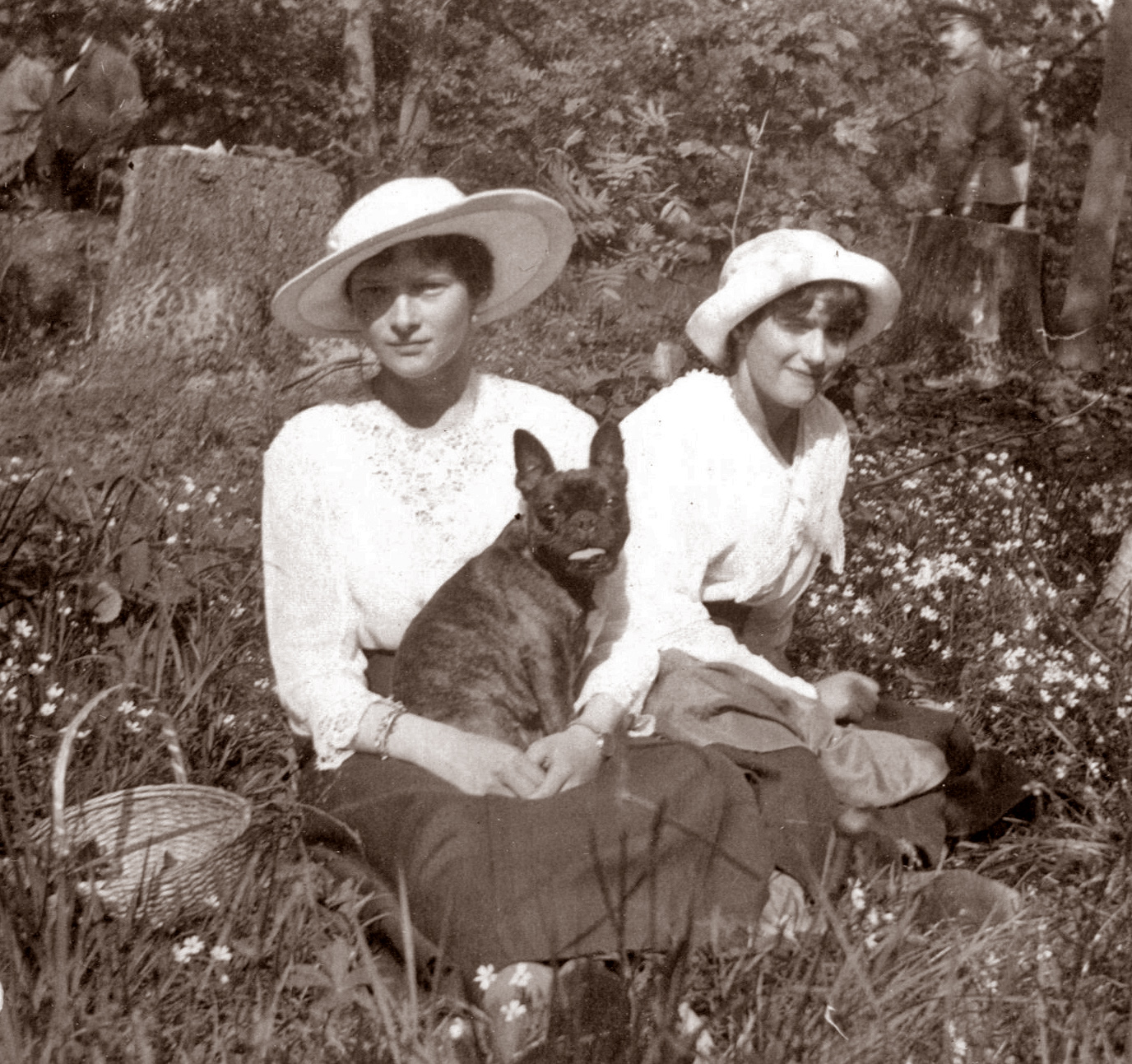
Grand Duchesses Tatiana and Anastasia and the dog Ortipo in captivity at Tsarskoe Selo in the spring of 1917

At Yekaterinburg, Tatiana occasionally joined her younger sisters in chatting with some of the guards over tea, asking them questions about their families and talking about her hopes for a new life in England when they were released. On one occasion one of the guards forgot himself and told the grand duchesses an off-color joke. The shocked Tatiana ran from the room, "pale as death", and her younger sister Maria scolded the guards for their bad language. She "would be pleasant to the guards if she thought they were behaving in an acceptable and decorous manner," recalled another of the guards in his memoirs. Later, when a new commander was placed in charge of the Ipatiev House, the family was forbidden from fraternizing with the guards and the rules of their confinement became more strict. Tatiana, still the family leader, was often sent by her parents to question the guards about rules or what would happen next to the family. She also spent a great deal of time sitting with her mother and ill brother, reading to her mother or playing games to occupy the time. At the Ipatiev House, Tatiana and her sisters were required to do their own laundry and make bread. Her nursing skills were called upon at the end of June 1918 when she gave an injection of morphine to Dr. Eugene Botkin to ease his kidney pain.

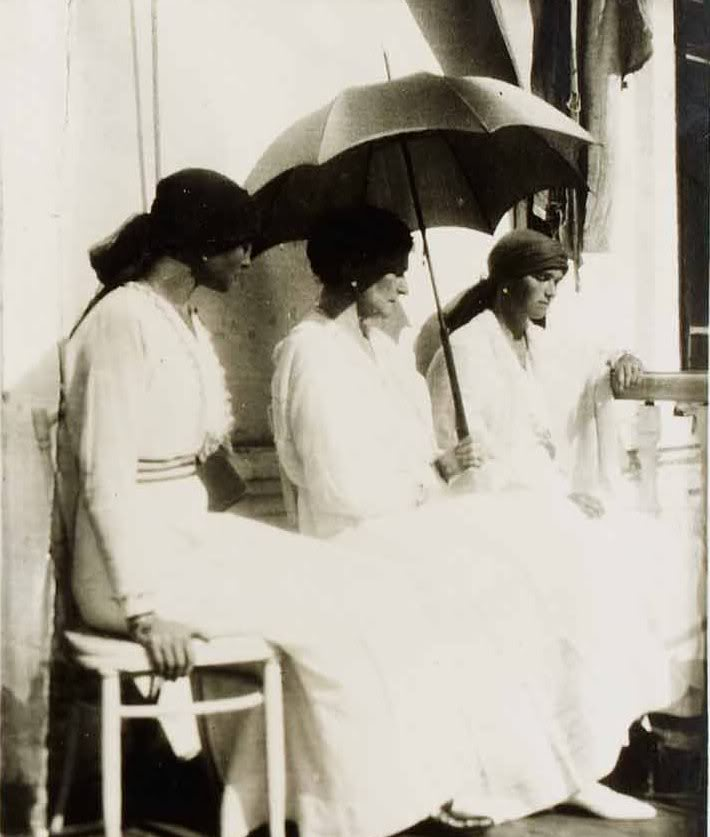
Grand Duchesses Tatiana (left) and Olga Nikolaevna (far right) with their mother, Tsarina Alexandra (center), in captivity at Tobolsk. This is one of their last known photos before their death in July 1918.

On 14 July 1918, local priests at Yekaterinburg conducted a private church service for the family and reported that Tatiana and her family, contrary to custom, fell on their knees during the prayer for the dead. The final entry in Tatiana's final notebook at Yekaterinburg was a saying she had copied from the words of a well-known Russian Orthodox holy man, Father Ioann of Kronstadt: "Your grief is indescribable, the Savior's grief in the Gardens of Gethsemane for the world's sins is immeasurable, join your grief to his, in it you will find consolation." The following day, on 15 July, Tatiana and her sisters appeared in good spirits as they joked with one another and moved the beds in their room so visiting cleaning women could scrub the floor. They got down on their hands and knees to help the women and whispered to them when the guards weren't looking. All four young women wore long black skirts and white silk blouses, the same clothing they had worn the previous day. Their short hair was "tumbled and disorderly". They told the women how much they enjoyed physical exertion and wished there was more of it for them to do in the Ipatiev House. On the afternoon of 16 July 1918, the last full day of her life, Tatiana sat with her mother and read from the Biblical Books of Amos and Obadiah, Alexandra noted in her diary. Later, mother and daughter sat and just talked. As the family was having dinner that night, Yakov Yurovsky, the head of the detachment, came in and announced that the family's kitchen boy and Alexei's playmate, 14-year-old Leonid Sednev, must gather his things and go to a family member. The boy had actually been sent to a hotel across the street because the guards did not want to kill him along with the rest of the Romanov party. The family, unaware of the plan to kill them, was upset and unsettled by Sednev's absence. Tatiana went that evening to Yurovsky's office, for what was to be the last time, to ask for the return of the kitchen boy who kept Alexei amused during the long hours of captivity. Yurovsky placated her by telling her the boy would return soon, but the family was unconvinced.

Late that night, on the night of 16 July, the family was awakened and told to come down to the lower level of the house because there was unrest in the town at large and they would have to be moved for their own safety. The family emerged from their rooms carrying pillows, bags, and other items to make Alexandra and Alexei comfortable. The family paused and crossed themselves when they saw the stuffed mother bear and cubs that stood on the landing, perhaps as a sign of respect for the dead. Nicholas told the servants and family "Well, we're going to get out of this place." They asked questions of the guards but did not appear to suspect they were going to be killed. Yurovsky, who had been a professional photographer, directed the family to take different positions as a photographer might. Alexandra, who had requested chairs for herself and Alexei, sat to her son's left. The Tsar stood behind Alexei, Dr. Botkin stood to the Tsar's right, Tatiana and her sisters stood behind Alexandra along with the servants. They were left for approximately half an hour while further preparations were made. The group said little during this time, but Alexandra whispered to the girls in English, violating the guard's rules that they must speak in Russian. Yurovsky came in, ordered them to stand, and read the sentence of execution. Tatiana and her family had time only to utter a few incoherent sounds of shock or protest before the death squad under Yurovsky's command began shooting. It was the early hours of 17 July 1918.

The initial round of gunfire killed only the Emperor, the Empress and two male servants, and wounded Grand Duchess Maria, Dr Botkin and the Empress' maidservant, Demidova. At that point the gunmen had to leave the room because of smoke and toxic fumes from their guns and plaster dust their bullets had released from the walls. After allowing the haze to clear for several minutes, the gunmen returned. Dr Botkin was killed, and a gunman named Ermakov repeatedly tried to shoot Tsarevich Alexei, but failed because jewels sewn into the boy's clothes shielded him. Ermakov tried to stab Alexei with a bayonet but failed again, and finally Yurovsky fired two shots into the boy's head. Yurovsky and Ermakov approached Olga and Tatiana, who were crouched against the room's rear wall, clinging to each other and screaming for their mother. Ermakov stabbed both young women with his 8-inch bayonet, but had difficulty penetrating their torsos because of the jewels that had been sewn into their chemises. The sisters tried to stand, but Tatiana was killed instantly when Yurovsky shot her in the back of her head. A moment later, Olga too died when Ermakov shot her in the head.

== Romanov graves and DNA proof ==
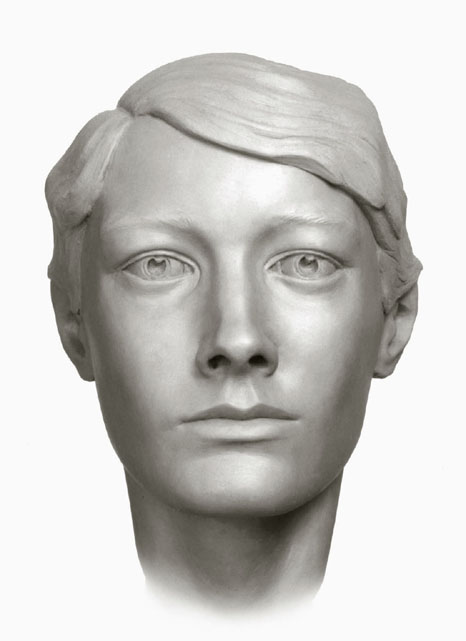
A forensic facial reconstruction of Grand Duchess Tatiana by S.A. Nikitin, 1994, based on the conclusion that Skeleton 5 belonged to Tatiana

For decades, conspiracy theorists suggested that one or more of the family somehow survived the slaughter. The theories were reduced in scale, but still persisted, when the bodies of most of the family were found and identified from a mass grave discovered in the forest outside Yekaterinburg and exhumed in 1991. The remaining conspiracies hinged on the fact that two bodies were missing, Tsarevich Alexei and one of the four grand duchesses, generally thought by Russians to be Grand Duchess Maria and by Americans to be Grand Duchess Anastasia. For example, author Michael Occleshaw made the claim in his 1995 book The Romanov Conspiracies: The Romanovs and the House of Windsor that Tatiana might have been rescued and transported to England, where she married a British officer and lived under the name Larissa Tudor. Occleshaw based this claim on studying the diaries of the British agent Richard Meinertzhagen, who hinted at the successful liberation of a Grand Duchess, allegedly Tatiana. However, historians discounted this claim and continued to say that all of the Romanovs, including Tatiana, were assassinated at Yekaterinburg.

On 23 August 2007, a Russian archaeologist announced the discovery of two burned, partial skeletons at a bonfire site near Yekaterinburg that appeared to match the site described in Yurovsky's memoirs. The archaeologists said the bones are from a boy who was roughly between the ages of twelve and fifteen years at the time of his death and of a young woman who was roughly between the ages of fifteen and nineteen years old. Anastasia was seventeen years, one month old at the time of the assassination, while her sister Maria was nineteen years, one month old and their brother Alexei was two weeks shy of his fourteenth birthday. Olga and Tatiana were twenty-two and twenty-one years old at the time of the assassinations. Along with the remains of the two bodies, archaeologists found "shards of a container of sulfuric acid, nails, metal strips from a wooden box, and bullets of various caliber." The bones were found using metal detectors and metal rods as probes.

Preliminary testing indicated a "high degree of probability" that the remains belonged to the Tsarevich Alexei and to one of his sisters, Russian forensic scientists announced on 22 January 2008. On 30 April 2008, Russian forensic scientists announced that DNA testing proved that the remains belong to the Tsarevich Alexei and to one of his sisters. With this result, all of the Tsar's family are accounted for.

== Sainthood ==
Saint Tatiana Romanova

Grand Duchess and Passion bearer (Note: Title used for Romanov Saints by Moscow Patriarchate) or Martyr (Note: Title used for Romanov Saints by ROCOR)
- Venerated in: Eastern Orthodox Church
- Canonized: 1981 by Russian Orthodox Church Abroad; 2000 by the Moscow Patriarchate
- Major shrine: Church on Blood, Yekaterinburg, Russia
- Feast: 17 July

In 1981 Tatiana and her family were canonized by the Russian Orthodox Church Abroad as holy martyrs. In 2000, Tatiana and her family were canonized by the Russian Orthodox Church as a passion bearer.

The bodies of Tsar Nicholas II, Tsarina Alexandra, and three of their daughters were finally interred at St. Peter and Paul Cathedral in St. Petersburg on 17 July 1998, eighty years to the day after they were murdered.

== Books ==
- Bokhanov, Alexander and Dr. Knodt, Manfred and Oustimenko, Vladimir and Peregudova, Zinaida and Tyutyunnik, Lyubov; Xenofontova, Lyudmila (translator); The Romanovs: Love, Power, and Tragedy. Leppi Publications, 1993. ISBN 0-9521644-0-X
- Christopher, Peter, Kurth, Peter, and Radzinsky, Edvard. Tsar: The Lost World of Nicholas and Alexandra ISBN 0-316-50787-3
- Dehn, Lili. The Real Tsaritsa. 1922.
- De Malama, Peter. "The Romanovs: The Forgotten Romance" in Royalty Digest. December 2004, p. 184.
- Eagar, Margaret. Six Years at the Russian Court, 1906.
- Fuhrmann, Joseph T. The Complete Wartime Correspondence of Nicholas and Alexandra: April 1914 – March 1917. Greenwood Press, 1999.
- Gilliard, Pierre. Thirteen Years at the Russian Court. ISBN 0-405-03029-0
- Hawkins, George. Correspondence of the Russian Grand Duchesses: Letters of the Daughters of the Last Tsar Amazon 2020. ISBN 979-8571453486
- King, Greg and Wilson, Penny. The Fate of the Romanovs, 2003. ISBN 0-471-20768-3
- Kurth, Peter, Anastasia: The Riddle of Anna Anderson, Back Bay Books, 1983, ISBN 0-316-50717-2
- "Tanya's Diary", Livadia.org
- Mager, Hugo. Elizabeth: Grand Duchess of Russia. Carroll and Graf Publishers, Inc., 1998, ISBN 0-7867-0678-3
- Massie, Robert K. Nicholas and Alexandra. 1967. ISBN 0-575-40006-4
- Massie, Robert K. The Romanovs: The Final Chapter. 1995. ISBN 0-679-43572-7
- Maylunas, Andrei and Mironenko, Sergei, Galy (editors); Darya (translator). A Lifelong Passion: Nicholas and Alexandra: Their Own Story. 1997, Doubleday, ISBN 0-385-48673-1.
- Occleshaw, Michael, Armour Against Fate: British Military Intelligence in the First World War and the Secret Rescue from Russia of the Grand Duchess Tatania. 1989, Columbus Books, ISBN 978-0-862-87407-0
- Occleshaw, Michael, The Romanov Conspiracies: The Romanovs and the House of Windsor, Orion, 1993, ISBN 1-85592-518-4
- Rappaport, Helen. The Last Days of the Romanovs. 2008. St. Martin's Griffin. 2008. ISBN 978-0-312-60347-2.
- Rappaport, Helen. "The Romanov Sisters: The Lost Lives of the Daughters of Nicholas and Alexandra." St. Martin's Griffin, 2014. ISBN 978-1250067456
- Radzinsky, Edvard. The Rasputin File. Doubleday. 2000, ISBN 0-385-48909-9
- Shevchenko, Maxim. "The Glorification of the Royal Family", a 31 May 2000 article in the Nezavisemaya Gazeta.
- Tschebotarioff, Gregory P., Russia: My Native Land: A U.S. engineer reminisces and looks at the present, McGraw-Hill Book Company, 1964, ASIN B00005XTZJ
- Vorres, Ian. The Last Grand Duchess. 1965. ISBN 1-55263-302-0
- Vyrubova, Anna. Memories of the Russian Court.
- Zeepvat, Charlotte. The Camera and the Tsars: A Romanov Family Album. 2004. ISBN 0-7509-3049-7
