= Derek =

- Pronunciation: /ˈdɛrɪk/
- Gender: Male

Origin
- Origin: short form of Diederik
- Meaning: see Theodoric

Other names
- Related names: Diederik, Dierk, Dieter, Dietrich, Dirk, Theodoric

Derek is a masculine given name. It is the English language short form of Diederik, the Low Franconian form of the name Theodoric. Theodoric is an old Germanic name with an original meaning of "people-ruler" or "lead the people".

Common variants of the name are Derrek, Derik, Deryck (included here), as well as Derrick and Derick.

== History ==
The English form of the name arises in the 15th century, via import from the Low Countries. The English (Anglo-Saxon) form of the name was Deoric or Deodric, from Old English Þēodrīc, but this name had fallen out of use in the medieval period. During the Late Middle Ages, there was intense contact between the territories adjacent to the North Sea, in particular due to the activities of the Hanseatic League. As a result, there was a lot of cross-pollination between Low German, Dutch, English, Danish and Norwegian. The given name Derk is found in records of the Low Countries from the early 14th century, and in the spelling Derck becomes rather common in name lists compiled in the Habsburg Netherlands during the early 16th century. An early bearer of the name Derek was lord of Keppel, Gelderland, in the early 14th century. A Derek van Keppel, lord of Verwoelde, died in 1495 and was succeeded by his eldest son, also called Derek van Keppel. A later Derek van Keppel died in 1646, succeeded by Asewolt van Keppel, the father of Arnold van Keppel, who in 1688 was made Earl of Albemarle in the Peerage of England.

== Given name "Derek" ==
=== Arts and entertainment ===
- Derek Acorah (1950–2020), British TV personality
- Derek Almstead (born 1974), musician/engineer
- Derek and the Dominos (active 1970–1971), blues-rock group
- Derek Andersen, one half of the DJ duo SLANDER
- Derek Bailey (guitarist) (1930–2005), jazz guitarist
- Derek Barbosa (born 1971), a.k.a. Chino XL, American rapper
- Derek Batey (1928–2013), British TV presenter
- Derek Bell (musician) (1935–2002), Irish harpist and composer
- Derek Benfield (1926–2009), British actor and playwright
- Derek Bermel (born 1967), American composer, clarinetist and conductor
- Derek Michael Besant (born 1950), Canadian artist
- Derek Bloom (born 1983), drummer of From First to Last
- Derek Bogaerde, birth name of Dirk Bogarde (1921–1999), British actor of Dutch/Scottish ancestry
- Derek Boland (1965-2009), a.k.a. Derek B, British DJ and rapper
- Derek Bond (1920–2006), actor, director and playwright
- Derek Boshier (born 1937), British pop artist
- Derek Bourgeois (1941–2017), English composer
- Derek Brockway (born 1967), Welsh meteorologist and TV presenter
- Derek Buckner, American realistic painter
- Derek Cecil (born 1973), American actor
- Derek Charke (born 1974), Canadian composer and flutist
- Derek Cianfrance (born 1974), American film director, cinematographer, screenwriter, and editor
- Derek de Lint (born 1950), Dutch actor
- Derek Deadman (1940–2014), British actor
- Derek Dick (born 1958), a.k.a. Fish, Scottish progressive rock singer/songwriter
- Derek Dingle (1937–2004), English close-up magician who lived in New York
- Derek Drymon (born 1965), American writer and storyboard artist
- Derek Edwards (born 1958), Canadian stand-up comedian and actor
- Derek Elphinstone (1913–1999), British actor
- Derek Erdman (born 1973), American artist
- Derek Forbes (born 1956), Scottish bassist
- Derek Ford (1932–1995), English film director/writer
- Derek Fordjour (born 1974), artist/painter and documentary producer
- Derek Fowlds (1937–2020), English actor
- Derek Francis (1923–1984), British comedy and character actor
- Derek Fudesco, bassist and vocalist with indie rock band Pretty Girls Make Graves
- Derek Gledhill, American drummer member of alternative rock/post-grunge music group Smile Empty Soul
- Derek Grant (drummer) (born 1977), drummer for punk band Alkaline Trio
- Derek Griffiths (born 1946), British actor
- Derek Guille (born 1951), Australian radio presenter
- Derek Hallworth, British television director
- Derek Hammond-Stroud (1926–2012), English opera singer
- Derek Hartley (born 1969), American radio talk-show host
- Derek Harvie (born 1971), Canadian entertainment writer and producer, living in the U.S.
- Derek Hess, American poster and album-cover artist
- Derek Hill (painter) (1916–2000), English portrait and landscape painter
- Derek R. Hill, film production designer
- Derek Hough (born 1985), American dancer, choreographer, musician and actor
- Derek Jacobi (born 1938), English actor and director
- Derek Jarman (1942–1994), English film director, stage designer, artist and writer
- Derek Kirk Kim (born 1974), American cartoonist
- Derek Kok (born 1964), Hong Kong actor
- Derek Lamb (1936–2005), American animation film-maker and producer
- Derek Leckenby (1943–1994), English musician and guitarist, member of Herman's Hermits
- Derek Longmuir (born 1951), drummer with the Bay City Rollers
- Derek Luke (born 1974), American actor
- Derek Lynch (born 1971), Canadian race car driver
- Derek Malcolm (1932–2023), British film critic
- Derek Martin (born 1933), English actor
- Derek McCulloch (1897–1967), BBC radio presenter and producer
- Derek McGrath (born 1951), Canadian actor
- Derek Meddings (1931–1995), British TV and cinema special effects expert
- Derek Mooney (born 1967), Irish radio and TV personality and producer
- Derek Murphy (musician), American drummer and session musician
- Derek Newark (1933–1998), English actor
- Derek Nimmo (1930–1999), English character actor
- Derek O'Brien (drummer) (born 1963), drummer and music producer
- Derek Oldham (1887–1968), English tenor
- Derek Paravicini (born 1979), English blind autistic savant and musical prodigy
- Derek Pascoe (born 1957), American vocalist
- Derek Pressnall, guitarist for the indie-pop group Tilly and the Wall
- Derek Piotr, folklorist and musician
- Derek Prince (1915–2003), American Christian radio preacher
- Derek Lee Ragin (born 1958), American singer
- Derek Richardson (actor) (born 1976), American actor
- Derek Riggs (born 1958), British artist
- Derek Riordan (born 1983), Scottish footballer (striker)
- Derek Rodier (born 1959), Scottish footballer
- Derek Roy (born 1983), Canadian ice hockey player
- Derek Royle (1929–1990), English actor
- Derek Sanderson (born 1946), Canadian ice hockey player and business executive
- Derek Saunders (1928–2018), English footballer
- Derek Sealy (1912–1982), West Indian cricketer
- Derek Shackleton (1924–2007), English cricketer
- Derek Shaw (businessman), English football club chairman
- Derek Sherinian (born 1966), American keyboard musician, composer and producer
- Derek Shulman (born 1947), Scottish singer/instrumentalist and record executive
- Derek Smart, controversial designer of video games
- Derek Smethurst (born 1948), South African footballer, author and sports consultant
- Derek Smith (basketball), (1961–1996), American basketball player
- Derek Smith (ice hockey born 1954), Canadian ice hockey player
- Derek Smith (ice hockey born 1984), Canadian ice hockey player
- Derek Smith (linebacker) (born 1975), American football player
- Derek Smith (Tight End) (born 1980), American football player
- Derek Smith (born 1979), a.k.a. Pretty Lights, American electronic musician
- Derek Soutar (born 1981), Scottish football goalkeeper
- Derek St. Holmes (born 1953), rock musician
- Derek Stephen Prince (born 1969), American voice actor and radio host
- Derek Stillie (born 1973), Scottish football goalkeeper
- Derek Stirling (born 1961), New Zealand cricketer
- Derek Strong (born 1968), American basketball player and racing driver
- Derek Tapscott (1932–2008), Welsh footballer
- Derek Taylor, Canadian news anchor and sportscaster
- Derek Temple (born 1938), English footballer
- Derek Thompson (actor) (born 1948), Northern Irish TV actor
- Derek Thompson (sports commentator) (born 1950), British horse racing commentator and presenter
- Derek Thompson, a.k.a. Hoodlum Priest, musician and record producer and engineer
- Derek Tracey (born 1971), Irish footballer
- Derek Trent (born 1980), American ice skater (pairs)
- Derek Trucks (born 1979), American blues-rock guitarist
- Derek Turner (1932–2015), rugby league footballer
- Derek Ufton (1928–2021), English cricketer
- Derek Underwood (born 1945), English cricketer
- Derek Varnals (1935–2019), South African cricketer
- Derek Wadsworth (1939–2008), British composer and arranger
- Derek Warfield (born 1943), Irish singer/songwriter and historian
- Derek Waring, born Derek Barton-Chapple (1927–2007), English actor
- Derek Warwick (born 1954), English F1 racing car driver
- Derek Waters (born 1979), American actor, comedian, screenwriter, producer and director
- Derek Webb (born 1974), American singer-songwriter
- Derek Whitehead (born 1944), English rugby league footballer
- Derek Whyte (born 1968), Scottish footballer
- Derek Woodcock, Australian rules football field umpire
- Derek X, a stage name, along with Sadat X, of American rapper Derek Murphy (born 1968)
- Derek Yee (born 1957), Hong Kong film director
- Derek Young (born 1980), Scottish ex-professional association football midfielder
- Derek Yu (born 1982), American independent game designer, video game artist, and blogger

=== Sports ===
- Derek Abney (born 1980), American football wide receiver
- Derek Anderson (American football) (born 1983), National Football League quarterback
- Derek Anderson (basketball) (born 1974), American basketball player
- Derek Armstrong (ice hockey) (born 1973), Canadian hockey player
- Derek Asamoah (born 1981), Ghanaian footballer playing in Korea
- Derek Barnett (born 1996), American football player
- Derek Bell (auto racer) (born 1941), British F1 racing car driver
- Derek Bell (baseball) (born 1968), American former Major League Baseball player
- Derek Bell (footballer, born 1956), English football player
- Derek Bell (footballer, born 1963), English football player
- Derek Bellotti (born 1946), English football player
- Derek Boateng (born 1983), Ghanaian footballer
- Derek Boogaard (1982–2011), Canadian ice hockey player
- Derek Bryant (boxer) (born 1971), American heavyweight boxer
- Derek Campbell (born 1980), Canadian ice hockey player
- Derek Campos (born 1988), American mixed martial artist
- Derek Carr (born 1991), American football player
- Derek Cassidy (born 1986), American football player
- Derek Chisora (born 1983), British heavyweight boxer
- Derek Clayton (born 1942), British/Australian long-distance runner
- Derek Collins (born 1969), Scottish footballer and football coach
- Derek Colman-Brusa (born 2008), American football player
- Derek Combs (born 1979), American football player
- Derek Cooke (born 1991), basketball player for Hapoel Gilboa Galil of the Israeli Basketball Premier League
- Derek Couch, a.k.a. Robbie McAllister, Scottish member of Canadian tag wrestling team The Highlanders
- Derek Cox (born 1986), American football player
- Derek Crookes (born 1969), South African cricketer
- Derek Curiel (born 2005), American baseball player
- Derek Curry (born 1981), American football player
- Derek Daly (born 1953), Irish F1 racing car driver
- Derek Darnell Brown (born 1971), American football player
- Derek Dawkins (born 1959), English professional footballer
- Derek de Boorder (born 1985), New Zealand cricketer
- Derek Dennis (born 1988), American football player
- Derek Dooley (American football coach) (born 1968), American football player and coach
- Derek Dooley (footballer) (1929–2008), English footballer, manager and club chairman
- Derek Dougan (1938–2007), Northern Irish footballer and club chairman
- Derek Edwards (rugby league) (died 2020), rugby league footballer
- Derek Fazackerley (born 1951), English footballer and coach
- Derek Ferguson (born 1967), Scottish footballer and club manager
- Derek Fisher (born 1974), American basketball player
- Derek Forbort (born 1992), American NHL defensemen (Boston Bruins, Winnipeg Jets, Calgary Flames, Los Angeles Kings)
- Derek Geary (born 1980), Irish footballer who played in England
- Derek Gee (born 1997), Canadian racing cyclist
- Derek Grimm (born 1974), American basketball player
- Derek Hagan (born 1984), American football player (wide receiver)
- Derek Hales (born 1951), English footballer
- Derek Hall (cricketer) (1932–1983), English cricketer
- Derek Hallas (born c. 1934), English rugby union and rugby league footballer
- Derek Hardiman (born 1981), Irish hurling player
- Derek Harper (born 1961), American basketball player and TV sports anchor
- Derek Hawksworth (1927–2021), English footballer
- Derek Heasley (born 1972), Irish cricketer
- Derek Higgins (born 1966), Irish Indy Lights racing car driver
- Derek Hill (driver) (born 1975), American former Formula 3000 driver
- Derek Ho (1964–2020), American surfer
- Derek Holland (born 1986), American baseball player
- Derek Holmes (born 1978), Scottish footballer
- Derek Hood (basketball) (born 1976), American basketball player
- Derek Howes, rugby league footballer
- Derek Ibbotson (1932–2017), English track athlete
- Derek Jeter (born 1974), American baseball player
- Derek Johnson (athlete) (1933–2004), British track athlete
- Derek Johnstone (born 1953), Scottish footballer
- Derek Joslin (born 1987), Canadian ice hockey player
- Derek Keenan (born 1961), Canadian lacrosse player
- Derek Kenway (born 1978), English cricketer
- Derek Kevan (1935–2013), English footballer
- Derek King (born 1967), Canadian ice hockey player
- Derek Krueger (born 2003), American freestyle skier
- Derek Lilley (born 1974), Scottish footballer
- Derek Lilliquist (born 1966) American baseball player and coach
- Derek Loccident (born 1998), American Paralympic athlete
- Derek Lowe (born 1973), American baseball player
- Derek Lyle (born 1981), Scottish footballer
- Derek Lyng (born 1978), Irish hurling player
- Derek MacKenzie (born 1981), Canadian ice hockey player
- Derek Malawsky (born 1973), Canadian lacrosse player
- Derek McInnes (born 1971), Scottish footballer
- Derek Meech (born 1984), Canadian ice hockey player
- Derek Miles (born 1972), American pole vaulter
- Derek Mills (born 1972), American track athlete
- Derek Morgan (1929–2017), English cricketer
- Derek Morris (ice hockey) (born 1978), Canadian ice hockey player
- Derek Mountfield (born 1962), English footballer
- Derek Murray (Gaelic footballer), Irish Gaelic footballer
- Derek Niven (born 1983), Scottish footballer
- Derek Noonan (1947–2009), rugby union and rugby league footballer
- Derek Norris (born 1989), American baseball player
- Derek Ogbeide (born 1997), Nigerian-Canadian basketball player
- Derek Oldbury a.k.a. DEO (1924–1994), British draughts champion and writer on the game
- Derek Pace (1932–1989), English footballer
- Derek Parish (born 1999), American football player
- Derek Parker (footballer) (1926–2011), English footballer
- Derek Parkin (born 1948), English footballer
- Derek Parlane (born 1953), Scottish footballer
- Derek Parra (born 1970), Mexican-American speed skater (ice)
- Derek Perera (born 1977), Sri Lankan Canadian cricketer
- Derek Phillips (footballer, born 1975) (born 1975), Trinidad and Tobago footballer
- Derek Piggott (1922–2019), British glider pilot
- Derek Plante (born 1971), American ice hockey player
- Derek Porter (born 1967), Canadian rower
- Derek Poundstone (born 1981), American professional strongman
- Derek Pringle (born 1958), English cricketer and cricket journalist
- Derek Quinnell (born 1949), Welsh rugby union player
- Derek Rackley (born 1977), American football player
- Derek Rae (born 1967), Scottish soccer commentator
- Derek Randall (born 1951), English cricketer
- Derek Redmond (born 1965), English track athlete
- Derek Reeves (1934–1995), English footballer
- Derek Ringer (born 1956), Scottish rally driver
- Derek Riordan (born 1983), Scottish footballer
- Derek Rivers (born 1994), American football player
- Derek Rodier (born 1959), Scottish footballer
- Derek Roy (born 1983), Canadian ice hockey player
- Derek Sanderson (born 1946), Canadian ice hockey player and business executive
- Derek Saunders (1928–2018), English footballer
- Derek Sealy (1912–1982), West Indian cricketer
- Derek Shackleton (1924–2007), English cricketer
- Derek Shaw (businessman), English football club chairman
- Derek Slywka (born 2001), American football player
- Derek Smethurst (born 1948), South African footballer, author and sports consultant
- Derek Smith (basketball), (1961–1996), American basketball player
- Derek Smith (ice hockey born 1954), Canadian ice hockey player
- Derek Smith (ice hockey born 1984), Canadian ice hockey player
- Derek Smith (linebacker) (born 1975), American football player
- Derek Smith (tight end) (born 1980), American football player
- Derek Soutar (born 1981), Scottish football goalkeeper
- Derek Stillie (born 1973), Scottish football goalkeeper
- Derek Stingley (born 1971), American football player
- Derek Stingley Jr. (born 2001), American football player
- Derek Stirling (born 1961), New Zealand cricketer
- Derek Strong (born 1968), American basketball player and racing driver
- Derek Tapscott (1932–2008), Welsh footballer
- Derek Temple (born 1938), English footballer
- Derek Tracey (born 1971), Irish footballer
- Derek Trent (born 1980), American pairs ice skater
- Derek Turner (1932–2015), rugby league footballer
- Derek Ufton (1928–2021), English cricketer
- Derek Underwood (born 1945), English cricketer
- Derek Varnals (1935–2019), South African cricketer
- Derek Warwick (born 1954), English F1 racing car driver
- Derek Whitehead (born 1944), rugby league footballer
- Derek Whyte (born 1968), Scottish footballer
- Derek Woodcock, Australian rules football field umpire

=== Business ===
- Derek Lambie (born 1975), Scottish newspaper editor
- Derek V. Smith, American business executive

=== Politics ===
- Derek Barber, Baron Barber of Tewkesbury (1918–2017), British civil servant, agricultural expert and politician
- Derek Beackon, English lorry driver and politician
- Derek Bedson (1920–1989), Canadian civil servant
- Derek Blackburn (1934–2017), Canadian politician
- Derek Brownlee (born 1974), Scottish politician
- Derek Bryan (1910–2003), British diplomat
- Derek Burney (born 1939), Canadian businessman, diplomat and political strategist
- Derek Clark (1933–2023), British politician and science teacher
- Derek Conway (born 1953), British politician
- Derek Coombs (1937–2014), British politician and corporate executive
- Derek Corrigan, Canadian politician
- Derek Croxton, American history researcher and writer
- Derek Draper (1967-2024), English former lobbyist involved in Cash for Access scandal in 1999, subsequently a psychotherapist
- Derek Enright (1935–1995), British politician
- Derek Ezra, Baron Ezra (1919–2015) British politician and corporate executive
- Derek Fatchett (1945–1999), British politician
- Derek Fletcher (born 1951), Canadian politician born in England
- Derek Foster, Baron Foster of Bishop Auckland (1937–2019), British politician
- Derek Freeman (1916–2001), New Zealand anthropologist
- Derek Gregory (born 1951), British geographer
- Derek Hatton (born 1948), English politician, businessman and after-dinner speaker
- Derek Holland (activist), British politician and writer who uses several pen-names: Harry Worthington, Rory O'Connor, D. Liam O'Huallachain, Derek O'Huallachain, and Deric O'Huallachain
- Derek Humphry (born 1930), writer of the suicide handbook Final Exit and president of the Euthanasia Research & Guidance Organization
- Derek Hussey (born 1948), Northern Irish politician
- Derek Keppel (1863–1944), British nobleman, soldier and member of the royal household
- Derek Laud (born 1964), English political lobbyist
- Derek Lee (politician) (born 1948), Canadian lawyer and politician
- Derek Lodge (1929–1996), English civil servant and statistician
- Derek Mackay (born 1977), Scottish politician
- Derek McDowell (born 1958), Irish politician
- Derek Mooney (born 1962), Irish ministerial adviser and Fianna Fáil campaign manager
- Derek Moore-Brabazon, 2nd Baron Brabazon of Tara (1910–1974)
- Derek Morris (academic) (born 1945), British academic, formerly chairperson of the Competition Commission
- Derek O'Brien (politician) (born 1961), Indian politician and television personality
- Derek Oulton (1927–2016), lawyer and civil servant
- Derek Page, Baron Whaddon (1927–2005), British politician
- Derek Prag (1923–2010), British politician
- Derek Quigley (born 1932), New Zealand politician
- Derek Robinson (trade unionist) (1927–2017), British motor industry shop steward a.k.a. "Red Robbo"
- Derek Schofield (born 1945), Chief Justice of Gibraltar
- Derek Simpson (trade unionist) (born 1944), British trade unionist
- Derek Spencer (1936–2023), British politician
- Derek Hugh Taylor (born 1951), Chief Minister of the Turks and Caicos Islands from 1995 to 2003
- Derek Twigg (born 1959) English politician
- Derek James Walding (1937–2007), Canadian politician, born in England
- Derek Walker-Smith, Baron Broxbourne (1910–1992), British politician
- Derek Wall, British politician
- Derek Watkins, British docker shop steward, member of the Pentonville Five
- "Derek Wee", name used in a controversial blog by Wee Siew Kim (born 1960), Singaporean politician
- Derek Wells (born 1946), Canadian politician and lawyer
- Derek Worlock (1920–1996), British Roman Catholic bishop
- Derek Wyatt (born 1949), British politician

=== Science, education and academics ===
- Derek Abbott (born 1960), physicist and electronic engineer
- Derek Barton (1918–1998), British physical chemist and Nobel Prize laureate
- Derek Bickerton (1926–2018), linguist and academic
- Derek Birley (1926–2002), academic and educator
- Derek Blake, academic and research scientist
- Derek Bok (born 1930), American lawyer and educator
- Derek Briggs (born 1950), Irish paleontologist
- Derek Denny-Brown (1901–1981), British neurologist
- Derek Denton (1924–2022), Australian scientist
- Derek Hirst (born 1948), English historian of early-modern Britain
- Derek Hockridge (1934–2013), British translator, lecturer and expert in French society and culture
- Derek Hopwood (1933–2020), British academic and author
- Derek Kidner (1913-2008), British Old Testament scholar
- Derek Long (1925–2020), former professor of structural chemistry at the University of Bradford, working in the field of Raman spectroscopy
- Derek McCormack, New Zealand biochemist and academic
- Derek Wragge Morley (1920–1969) independent science consultant and journalist noted for study of ants
- Derek Parfit (1942–2017), British philosopher and academic
- Derek J. de Solla Price (1922–1983), information scientist and science historian
- Derek Ratcliffe (1929–2005), British nature conservationist
- Derek Roe (1937–2014), British paleolithic archeologist and academic
- Derek Summerfield, controversial psychiatrist and writer
- Derek Taunt (1917–2004), British mathematician and codebreaker
- Derek van der Kooy (born 1952), scientist and academic working in stem cell research

=== Writing ===
- Derek Beaulieu (born 1973), Canadian poet, publisher and anthologist
- Derek Benz (born 1971), American author of children's fantasy
- Derek Hansen (born 1944), New Zealand/Australia fiction writer, born in England
- Derek Jameson (1929–2012), British journalist
- Derek Landy (born 1974), Irish author and screenwriter
- Derek Mahon (1941–2020), Irish poet
- Derek Marlowe (1938–1996), English playwright, novelist and screenwriter
- Derek McCormack (born 1969), Canadian fiction writer
- Derek Parker (born 1932), British writer and broadcaster
- Derek Raymond (1931–1994), English noir writer
- Derek Robinson (novelist) (born 1932), British military aviation novelist and pilot
- Derek Tangye (1912–1996), English author
- Derek Taylor (1932–1997), British journalist and press agent for The Beatles
- Derek Turner (journalist) (born 1964), Irish journalist
- Derek Walcott (1930–2017), West Indian poet, playwright, writer and visual artist
- Derek Wood (author) (1930–2003), author of Jane's World Aircraft Recognition Handbook

=== Miscellaneous ===
- Derek Bentley (1933–1953), Englishman hanged for murder and subsequently pardoned
- Derek Chauvin (born 1976), American former police officer convicted in the murder of George Floyd
- Derek Anthony Seagrim (1903–1943), English soldier and recipient of the Victoria Cross
- Derek Watson (priest) (born 1938), British retired churchman, former Dean of Salisbury in the Church of England
- Derek Wood (c. 1964 – 1988), one of two British soldiers killed in the 1988 Corporals killings incident
- Derek (horse) (born 1978), a Brazilian thoroughbred racehorse

=== Fictional characters ===
- Derek, character in the 2003 film The Cheetah Girls
- Derek and Clive, controversial cult characters portrayed by Dudley Moore and Peter Cook
- Derek the Diesel, character from Thomas & Friends
- Derek the Sheep, eponymous character in a comic strip in the Beano
- Derek Almond, character in the graphic novel V for Vendetta
- Derek Blunt, anthropomorphic hawk in Darkwing Duck
- Derek Branning, character in the BBC soap EastEnders
- Derek Charles, protagonist of the 2009 film Obsessed
- Derek Conway, character in British TV series The Bill
- Derek Danforth, main antagonist of the 2024 film The Beekeeper
- Derek Faye, character in The Catherine Tate Show who appears to be in denial about his sexuality
- Derek Flint, eponymous character in Our Man Flint
- Derek Frye, character in the ABC soap opera All My Children
- Derek Generic, character from the animated series Bobby's World.
- Derek Harkinson, character in the BBC soap EastEnders
- Derek Hale, character in MTV's Teen Wolf played by Tyler Hoechlin
- Derek Klivian, pilot in the Rogue Squadron from Star Wars
- Derek Morgan, character in the criminal drama series Criminal Minds played by Shemar Moore
- Derek Mullard, a Danger Mouse character played by Jon Heder
- Derek Noakes, eponymous character in the comedy-drama pilot Derek
- Derek O'Farrell, character in the British soap Brookside
- Derek Powers a.k.a. Blight, supervillain in the animated series Batman Beyond
- Derek Shepherd former Head of Neurosurgery at Grey-Sloan Memorial Hospital, in the American medical series Grey's Anatomy
- Derek Smalls, character in the spoof rockumentary This Is Spinal Tap
- Derek Stiles, character in the Trauma Center series of video games
- Derek Taylor, a character in the American TV sitcom Silver Spoons
- Derek Trotter, character in the TV comedy series Only Fools and Horses
- Derek Vinyard, character in the American crime drama film American History X
- Derek Venturi, title character in the Canadian TV show Life with Derek
- Derek Wakaluk, a character played by Will Sasso in the Canadian teen drama television series Madison
- Derek Wheeler a.k.a. "Wheels", character in the Degrassi series
- Derek Wildstar, character in the TV series Star Blazers
- Derek Wilton, character in the TV soap Coronation Street
- Derek Zoolander, eponymous character in the film Zoolander
- Derek (The Good Place character), character in The Good Place
- Derek Lucks, former head of TASCorp, inventor of the Meta Runner arm and overall antagonist of season 1 and 2 of the Meta Runner internet series. He was shot in the head by Masa (under the control of Dr. Sheridan) in the last episode of season 2.
- Prince Derek, one of the main characters in the animated film The Swan Princess

== Spelling variants ==
=== Derik ===
- Derik John Baker (born January 31, 1990), known as Virginia To Vegas,
- Derik Hultquist, American singer-songwriter
- Derik Lacerda (born 1999), Brazilian footballer
- Derik Lynch, Australian artist and performer
- Derik Osede (born 1993), Spanish footballer, known as Derik
- Derik Queen (born 2004), American basketball player
- Derik Steiner (born 1987), American former football player

=== Derrek ===
- Derrek Cooper (born 2008), American football player
- Derrek Konrad (born 1943), Canadian politician
- Derrek Lee (born 1975), American former baseball player
- Derrek Pitts Jr. (born 1998), American football player
- Derrek Tuszka (born 1997), American football player

=== Deryck ===
- Deryck Guyler (1914–1999), English actor
- Deryck Whibley (born 1980), Canadian singer-songwriter

== Popularity ==
Since 1940, the peak of the popularity of the name Derek in the United States was in the 1980s.

Popularity ranks of "Derek" in the USA since 1943 Columns are years within decade.
	0	1	2	3	4	5	6	7	8	9
2010s	170	181	182							
2000s	121	132	139	149	156	172	159	142	159	168
1990s	54	59	62	67	77	83	101	106	110	114
1980s	50	53	50	51	52	56	57	54	53	54
1970s	77	63	67	69	74	83	84	82	75	72
1960s	247	205	187	177	172	166	141	123	122	109
1950s	470	407	363	378	362	331	300	283	256	254
1940s				714	953	^	956	891	862	641

Rank 1 is the most popular, rank 2 is the next most popular, and so forth.

^ Rank > 1000

Source: Social Security Administration.

== See also ==
- All pages beginning with Derek
- Darrick
- Derrick (disambiguation)
- Dirk (name)
