= Derek (disambiguation) =

Derek is a masculine given name. It may also refer to:

== People ==
- Derek (surname), an English-language surname
- Đerek, a Croatian surname
- Derek (footballer), Brazilian footballer

== Other uses ==
- Derek (TV series)
- Derek (2008 film), a British documentary film
- Derek (1974 film), a New Zealand short film
- "Derek" (The Good Place episode)
- Derek (video game)
- Derek (horse), Brazilian thoroughbred racehorse
- Derek, a fictional character from the animated series Super Duper Bunny League
