= Pesser =

Pesser is a surname. Notable people with the surname include:

- Dirck Pesser (c. 1585–1651), Dutch businessman
- Hans Pesser (1911–1986), Austrian footballer and manager

== See also ==
- Hesser
- Messer (surname)
- Posser (surname)
- Tesser
