= Dirks (surname) =

Dirks is a patronymic surname ("son of Dirk"). Some variant forms are Derks, Dircks, Dirkse, Dirksen, Dirksz and Dirkx. People with this name include:

- Andy Dirks (born 1986), American Major League Baseball player
- Alexa Dirks (using stage name Begonia), Canadian musician
- Gordon Dirks (born 1947), Canadian educator and former politician
- Howard Dirks (1938–2018), Canadian politician
- Jane Claire Dirks-Edmunds (1912–2003), American ecologist, biologist and author
- John Dirks (cartoonist) (1917–2010), American cartoonist and sculptor
- John Dirks (physician) (born 1933), Canadian physician
- Nicholas Dirks (born 1950), American historian and Chancellor of the University of California, Berkeley
- Robert Dirks (1978–2015), American chemist
- Rudolph Dirks (1877–1968), German-American comic strip artist, known for The Katzenjammer Kids
- Samantha Dirks (born 1992), Belizean sprinter
- Tonnie Dirks (born 1961), Dutch long-distance runner
- Walter Dirks (1901–1991), German political commentator, theologian and journalist

Dircks

- Henry Dircks (1806–1873), English engineer

Dirksz

- Germain Dirksz (born 1976), Aruban footballer
- Lucien Dirksz (born 1968), Aruban racing cyclist

== See also ==
- Dirks (disambiguation)
- Dierckx or Dierkx, surname
- DIRKS, an Australian government methodology for record keeping
