= All-Red Route =

Royal Mail Ships steamship route

An All-Red Route was, originally, a steamship route used by Royal Mail Ships during the heyday of the British Empire. The name derives from the common practice of colouring the territory of the British Empire red or pink on political maps. It denoted a long-distance route where all the ports of call were in British territories or colonies, emphasising not only the usefulness of the route as a means of connecting the British metropole with the worldwide empire but also the strategic security of being able to connect (and travel between) possessions on the other side of the globe without having to rely on making stops in, or passing through, the territory of another nation.

Initially the term was used to apply only to steamship routes (as these were the only practical way of carrying communications between Great Britain and the rest of the Empire), particularly to India via the Suez Canal—a route sometimes referred to as the British Imperial Lifeline. Rail transport was used across France and Italy to the Mediterranean. From 1868 to 1871 the Mont Cenis Pass Railway, a temporary mountain railway line over the Mont Cenis Pass was used for mail.

After use of steamships became widespread at sea, strategically placed coaling stations were acquired to guarantee the mobility of both civil and naval fleets.

In the 1880s the term "All-Red Route" was expanded to include the telegraph network (see All Red Line) that connected various parts of the Empire, and by the 1920s it was also being used in reference to proposed air routes, initially airship and then flying boat, between Great Britain and the rest of the Empire, see Imperial Airship Scheme.

The Suez Canal route dramatically shortened the sea path between Britain and its possessions in Asia (primarily India). Conscious of its significance, the British sent troops to take control of the canal during the Anglo-Egyptian War in 1882. Even after British troops were withdrawn from the rest of Egypt in accordance with the Anglo-Egyptian Treaty of 1936, Britain continued to control the canal and kept troops stationed in the canal zone. After Egyptian President Gamal Abdel Nasser nationalised the canal in 1956, sparking the Suez Crisis, British Prime Minister Anthony Eden declared that "The Egyptian has his thumb on our windpipe", describing the Suez as the "great imperial lifeline".

The major "All-Red Route" ran as follows:

Southern Britain → Gibraltar → Malta → Alexandria → Port Said (after construction of the Canal) → Suez → Aden → Muscat (and access to the Persian Gulf) → India → Sri Lanka → Burma → Malaya → Singapore (branching out into the Pacific Ocean towards Hong Kong, Australia, New Zealand, and other British colonies).

The completion of the Canadian Pacific Railway in 1886 connected the Atlantic and Pacific oceans across what was then the Dominion of Canada. The CPR quickly began operating steamships between the west coast of Canada and East Asia, and in 1899 entered the trans-Atlantic liner trade. This made it possible to travel from Britain to Hong Kong (as well as Japan and China) westwards entirely by the CPR's services and without ever leaving a British-registered ship or British imperial territory. The CPR advertised this as 'The All-Red Route' and by the 1920s had added Australia and New Zealand to its trans-Pacific services, adding those dominions to its network. Other British shipping lines operating in the Pacific and the Far East made it possible to travel to Singapore. British Malaya and India via the CPR. The completion of the Canadian Northern Railway's transcontinental section in 1912 and the opening of the Grand Trunk Pacific Railway in 1917 provided alternative routes across Canada as part of this "All-Red Route".

Throughout the late 19th-century there were plans and ambitions for a Cape to Cairo Railway to link British colonies in Africa. The lack of a true "All-Red Route' - since British territory was not continuous between South Africa and Egypt was a major obstacle to this project being successful. Britain claimed the Tanganyika Territory from Germany after World War I, creating the potential for an "All-Red Route" the length of Africa but the necessary sections of railway were never constructed.

With the end of the British Empire and the increasing prevalence of air travel, the terms "All-Red Route" and "British Imperial Lifeline" have fallen from use, and now exist largely in a historical context, generally in reference to the routes in use during the British Empire.

== See also ==
- All Red Line
- Imperial Airship Scheme
- Imperial Airways

== Bibliography ==
- Reese, Trevor (1973). The All-Red Routes (The British Empire). London (UK): BBC TV/Time-Life Books.
- Ayoob, Mohammed (1980). Conflict and Intervention in the Third World. Taylor & Francis. ISBN 978-0-7099-0063-4.
- Herring, George C. (2008). From Colony to Superpower: U.S. Foreign Relations Since 1776. US: Oxford University Press. ISBN 978-0-19-507822-0.
- Holland, Matthew F. (1996). America and Egypt: from Roosevelt to Eisenhower. Greenwood. ISBN 978-0-275-95474-1.
- Hopwood, Derek (1991). Egypt: Politics and Society 1945-1990. Taylor & Francis. ISBN 978-0-00-302028-1.
- Varble, Derek (2003). The Suez Crisis 1956: Essential Histories. Osprey. ISBN 978-1-84176-418-4.
