= Desborough College =

Coordinates: 51.5161°N 0.7268°W

Location
- Shoppenhangers Road; Maidenhead, Berkshire, SL6 2QB; England

Information
- Type: Academy
- Motto: Strenuis Ardua Cedunt ("Difficulties Yield To Diligence")
- Established: 1894
- Founder: F. Fairman
- Local authority: Windsor and Maidenhead
- Department for Education URN: 138879 Tables
- Ofsted: Reports
- Chair of Governors: Derek Wilson
- Principal: Andy Murdoch
- Gender: Boys with mixed sixth form
- Age: 11 to 18
- Enrolment: 730
- Houses: Hart, Lion, Phoenix and Eagle
- Colours: Purple and Gold
- Website: desborough.org.uk

Desborough College is a secondary school with academy status located on Shoppenhangers Road, Maidenhead, Berkshire, England.

Until 2009 it was an all-boys school, but the sixth form has since become co-educational. It was founded as Maidenhead Modern School in 1894 under its first Headmaster, F. Fairman, who was headmaster until 1910.

In the 1970s reform in the Royal Borough ensured all schools converted to the then new comprehensive schools system, which prompted the school's name change to Desborough School after Lord Desborough, a prominent Maidonian.

For the second time in the school's history it changed status in 2012 becoming an academy school, and changed its name to Desborough College. As part of its academy status it initially partnered with the independent Radley College, Microsoft and The John Lewis Partnership.

== History ==
According to the book One Hundred Not Out written by a former History master at the School, David M. Evans, the school was founded as Maidenhead Modern School in 1894, and was originally located on High Town Road. It was originally a private venture until taken over by Berkshire County Council in 1906, from whence the teachers became employees of the county. The school eventually moved to its present site on Shoppenhangers Road in 1910, after land had been purchased from Lord Desborough, after whom the school was eventually named. At this point the school was named Maidenhead County Boys' School.

In 1943, and under the Headmastership of A. W. Eagling, the school became known as Maidenhead County Boys' Grammar School. That changed in September 1973 when it converted to comprehensive schooling under the guidance of headmaster Leonard 'Rover' Reynolds, a World War Two veteran, who, at 21, became commander of Motor Gunboat 658, in the Mediterranean.

During the 1990s Desborough School became a grant-maintained school. The passing of the School Standards and Framework Act 1998 abolished grant-maintained schools and Desborough reverted to LEA control.

The school became an academy in October 2012 and changed its official name to Desborough College.

== Notable former pupils ==
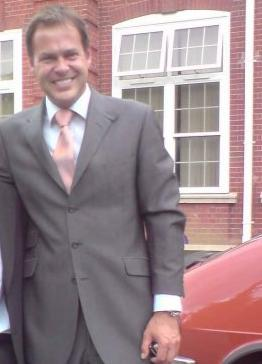
Entrepreneur Peter Jones at the school in 2008

- Ajaz Khowaj Quoram Ahmed, businessperson
- Toby Anstis, radio DJ for London's Heart FM
- John B, drum and bass DJ and graduate of molecular biology
- Guy Fletcher, Dire Straits keyboard player
- Donald Hamilton Fraser, artist
- Derek Hallworth, Countdown director
- Charles Hart, lyricist (Aspects of Love, The Phantom of the Opera, Love Never Dies)
- Matt Holmes, Commandant General Royal Marines
- Nick Hornby, writer and lyricist
- Peter Jones, businessperson and reality television personality
- John O'Farrell, author, comedy scriptwriter, and political campaigner
- Mark Richardson, GB 400-metre runner
- David Widgery, Marxist writer, journalist, polemicist, physician, and a leading member of the Socialist Workers Party
- Neil Woodford, British fund manager

== Headteachers ==
- F. Fairman, 1894–1910
- J. Stanton, 1910–1913
- A. E. Brooks, 1913–1941
- A. W. Eagling, 1941–1954 (oversaw conversion to grammar school)
- J. C. Oliver, 1954–1960
- C. Macdonald, 1960–1965
- L. C. Reynolds, 1965–1981 (oversaw conversion to comprehensive school)
- D. F. Miller, 1981–1988
- M. J. Oddie, 1988–1994
- D. Eyre, 1994–2005, who moved to Brighton Hill Community College at Basingstoke.
- A. Linnell, 2005–2012
- P. Frazer, 2012–2019
- M. Callaghan, 2019–2022, the first female headteacher of Desborough.
- A. Murdoch, 2022–present

== Sixth Form ==
Desborough sixth form offers full-time places to female students, making it a mixed sixth form. It is led by the head of Key Stage 5 education and two heads of year.

The school has joined The Consortium programme along with Altwood Church of England School, Cox Green, Newlands School and Furze Platt Senior School in 2003. The Consortium allows sixth form students to take a subject not offered at their school and study it at another participating school. Subjects such as geology and politics are among the subjects that Desborough offers to the other schools. Transport is provided between schools.
