= Dirk (name) =

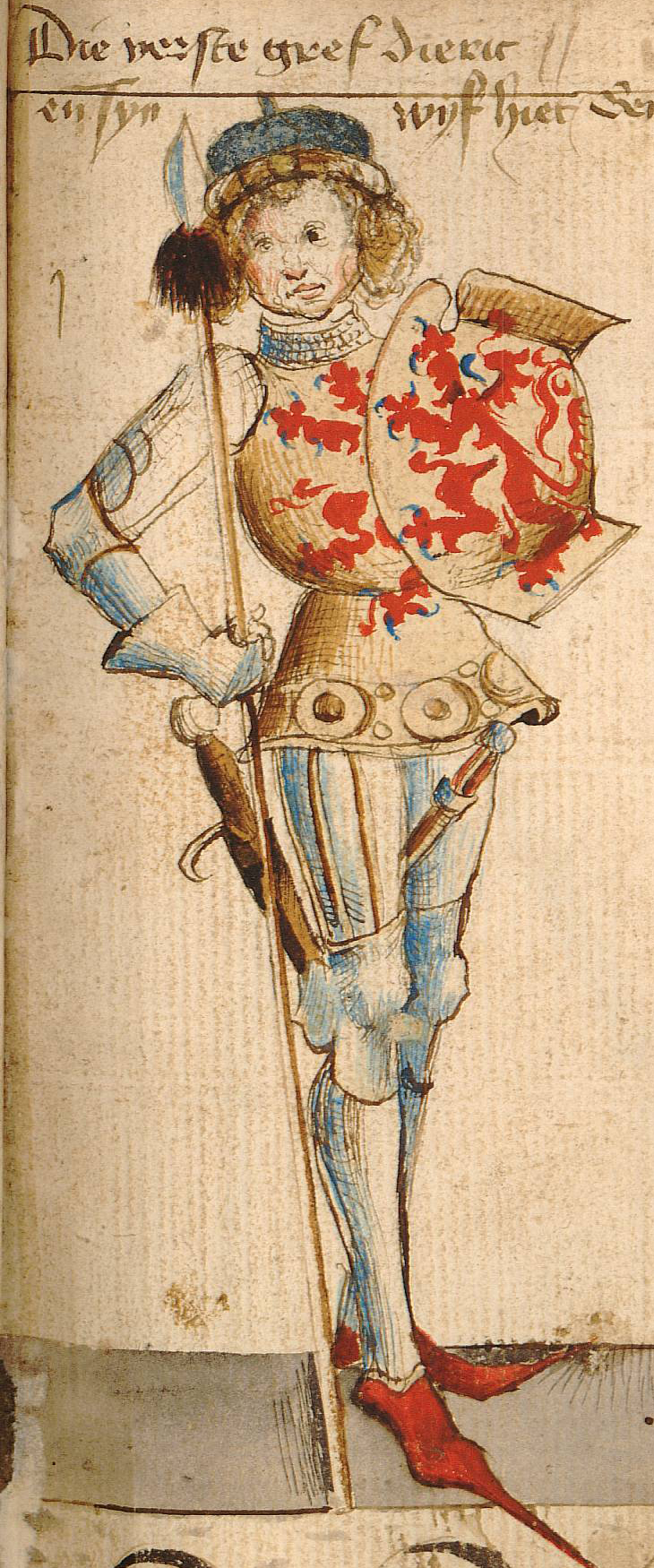
- Dirk I, Count of Holland
- Gender: Male

Origin
- Languages: Dutch: Low Franconian, Low Germanic

Other names
- Related names: Diederik, Derek, Theodoric, Theodore

Dirk is a male given name of Dutch origin. It is a traditional diminutive of the Dutch name Diederik. The meaning of the name is "the people's ruler", composed of þeud ("people") and ric ("power"). Dirk may also be a surname. It is cognate to French Thierry, German Dietrich and Gothic Theoderic.

== People with the given name ==
- Count Dirk I of Holland (died 944)
- Count Dirk II of Holland (944–988)
- Count Dirk III of Holland (died 1039)
- Dirk IV, Count of Holland (1020–1049)
- Dirk V, Count of Holland (1052–1091)
- Dirk VI, Count of Holland (1114–1157)
- Dirk VII, Count of Holland (died 1203)
- Dirk Bach (1961–2012), German actor
- Dirk Bauermann (born 1957), German basketball coach
- Dirk Benedict (born 1945), American actor
- Dirk Bezemer (born 1971), Dutch economist
- Dirk Bikkembergs (born 1959), Belgian fashion designer
- Dirk Blocker (born 1957), American actor
- Dirk Bolt (1930–2020), Dutch-born architect
- Dirk Bootsma (1936–2020), Dutch geneticist
- Dirk Brouwer (1902–1966), American astronomer
- Dirk Brossé (born 1960), Belgian composer
- Dirk Bruinenberg (born 1968), Dutch musician
- Dirk Chivers (fl. 1694–1699), Dutch pirate
- Dirk Coster (1889–1950), Dutch physicist
- Dirk Crabeth (1501–1574), Dutch artist
- Dirk Cussler (born 1961), American writer
- Dirk Dirksen (1937–2006), American music promoter
- Dirk Elbers (born 1959), German politician
- Dirk Else (born 1977), German ski jumper
- Dirk Fock (1858–1941), Dutch politician
- Dirk Frimout (born 1941), Belgian astronaut and astrophysicist
- Dirk Gates (born 1961), American businessman
- Dirk Geukens (1963–2020), Belgian motocross racer
- Dirk Hartog (1580–1621), Dutch sailor and explorer
- Dirk Hayhurst (born 1981), American author
- Dirk Jan de Geer (1870–1960), Dutch politician and prime minister
- Dirk Jan Struik (1894–2000), Dutch mathematician and historian
- Dirk Johnson (born 1975), American football player
- Dirk Kemp (1913–1983), South African football player
- Dirk Kempthorne (1951–2026), American politician
- Dirk Kienscherf (born 1965), German politician
- Dirk de Klerk (1852–1920), Dutch politician
- Dirk Koetter (born 1959), American football coach
- Dirk Kuyt (born 1980), Dutch football player
- Dirk Mädrich (born 1983), German basketball player
- Dirk Mudge (1928–2020), Namibian politician
- Dirk Müller (artist) (born 1946), Dutch sculptor
- Dirk Müller (cyclist) (born 1973), German cyclist
- Dirk Müller (racing driver) (born 1975), German race car driver
- Dirk Nannes (born 1976), Australian cricket player
- Dirk Niebel (born 1963), German politician
- Dirk Nowitzki (born 1978), German basketball player
- Dirk Polder (1919–2001), Dutch physicist
- Dirk Reichardt (born 1964), German composer
- Dirk Schlächter (born 1965), German bassist
- Dirk Schreyer (1944–2025), German rower
- Dirk Stikker (1897–1979), Dutch politician and diplomat
- Dirk Stoop (1615–1686), Dutch painter
- Dirk Uittenbogaard (born 1990), Dutch rower
- Dirk Valkenburg (1675–1721), Dutch painter
- Dirk van Braeckel (born 1958), Belgian car designer
- Dirk van Erp (1860–1933), American coppersmith
- Dirk Van Raalte (1844–1910), American Union soldier and politician
- Dirk de Waard (1919–2011), Dutch-born American geologist
- Dirk Willems (died 1569), Dutch Anabaptist martyr and pacifist
- Dirk Wilutzky (born 1965), German film maker

== People with the nickname ==
- Dirk Bogarde (1921–1999), stage name of British actor Derek van den Bogaerde
- Stewart "Dirk" Fischer (1924–2013), American composer and musician
- Dirk Gringhuis (1918–1974), American artist and illustrator
- Dirk Meyer (born 1961), American businessman
- Dirk West (1930–1996), American editorial cartoonist and journalist
- Dirk from Veristablium, nickname of Derek Muller

== People with the surname ==
- Robert Dirk (born 1966), Canadian ice hockey player

== Fictional characters with the name ==
- Dirk, a character from the horror comic series Witch Creek Road
- Dirk Anger, Marvel Comics character
- Dirk the Daring, the main character in the video game Dragon's Lair
- Dirk Dagger (also known as Dirk Spanner), the main character in the video game Dirk Dagger and the Fallen Idol
- Dirk Diggler, the main character in Boogie Nights played by Mark Wahlberg
- Dirk Dreamer, a character in the video game The Sims 2
- Dirk Gently, the main character in Dirk Gently's Holistic Detective Agency by Douglas Adams
- Dirk McQuickly, the equivalent of Paul McCartney in The Beatles parody band The Rutles
- Dirk Morgna, DC Comics character also known as Sun Boy
- Dirk Pitt, the main character in novels by Clive Cussler
- Dirk Strider, a character from the webcomic Homestuck
- Dirk Struan, the main character in James Clavell's 1966 novel Tai-Pan
- Dirk, a main character on Disney Channel's Bizaardvark
- Blackblaze Dirk, a villain in Xenoblade Chronicles 3

== See also ==
- Derek (name)
- Dirck, given name
- Dirks (surname)
