= Dirk (disambiguation) =

A dirk is a type of dagger.

Dirk may also refer to:

- Dirk (name), a list of people and fictional characters with the given name, nickname, stage name or surname
- Dirk (play), a 1995 stage play adapted from the novel Dirk Gently's Holistic Detective Agency by Douglas Adams
- The Dirk, a 1948 children's book by Anatoly Rybakov
- Dirk (supermarket), a supermarket chain in the Netherlands
- Cyclone Dirk, a 2013 European windstorm

== See also ==
- Dirks (surname), a list of people with the surname Dirks or spelling variants thereof
