= Dirck =

Dirck is a given name. Notable people with the name include:

- Dirck Barendsz (1534–1592), Dutch Renaissance painter from Amsterdam
- Dirck Bleker (1621–1702), Dutch Golden Age painter
- Dirck Coornhert (1522–1590), Dutch writer, philosopher, translator, politician and theologian
- Dirck Cornelis de Hooch (1613–1651), 17th-century Dutch portrait painter
- Dirck de Bray (1635–1694), Dutch Golden Age painter
- Dirck Ferreris (1639–1693), Dutch Golden Age painter
- Dirck Gerritsz Pomp (1544–1608), Dutch sailor, the first known Dutchman to visit Japan
- Dirck Hals (1591–1656), Dutch painter of festivals and ballroom scenes
- Dirck Halstead, (born 1936), photojournalist, and editor and publisher of The Digital Journalist
- Dirck Helmbreker (1633–1696), Dutch Golden Age painter of Italianate landscapes
- Dirck Jacobsz. (1496–1567), Dutch Renaissance painter
- Dirck Pesser (1585–1651), Dutch brewer from Rotterdam
- Dirck Rembrantsz van Nierop (1610–1682), Dutch cartographer, mathematician, surveyor, astronomer, teacher and preacher
- Dirck Storm (1630–1716), early colonial American, recorded the history of the Dutch community at Sleepy Hollow
- Dirck Ten Broeck (1765–1832), American lawyer and politician
- Dirck Tulp or Diederik Tulp (1624–1682), son of surgeon professor Nicolaes Tulp, involved in the Dutch East India Company and the Civic guard
- Dirck van Baburen (1595–1624), Dutch painter associated with the Utrecht Caravaggisti
- Dirck van Bergen (1645–1700), Dutch Golden Age landscape painter
- Dirck van Cloon (1684–1735), Eurasian Governor-General of the Dutch East Indies
- Dirck van der Lisse (1607–1669), Dutch Golden Age painter
- Dirck van Santvoort (1610–1680), Dutch Golden Age painter
- Peter Dirck Keyser (born 1835), United States ophthalmologist

== See also ==
- Dirk (name)
