= Herek =

Herek is a surname. Notable people with the surname include:

- Gregory M. Herek (born 1954), American psychologist and writer
- Stephen Herek (born 1958), American film director

== See also ==
- Derek (surname)
