= Nacah =

2001 video game

- Developer: Virtue Creations
- Publisher: Bible Games Company
- Platform: Microsoft Windows
- Release: WW: 2001
- Genres: Point-and-click adventure game, edutainment
- Modes: Single-player, multiplayer

Nacah is a 2001 educational adventure game developed by American studio Virtue Creations and published by Bible Games Company for Windows. A sequel entitled Derek was released in 2003. Derek was revamped into Isles of Derek in 2005.

== Plot and gameplay ==
The games are point-and-click adventures with a Christian theme. They are played via first-person and see players navigate through a slide-show of screens. Nacah sees players have to escape an island where they are stranded. Derek sees players help characters become reunited with their Bibles. It is recommended that players have a Bible with them to complete puzzles. Some scenes contain Quicktime video overlays.

== Production ==
Of the game, Rick Tewell, co-founder and CEO of Virtue Games, said "American media culture is focused on violence, death, and sex. The most popular shows on television, like 'CSI,' are all based on death and violent behavior. We feel the need to produce products that counter the major media companies' message." Nacah and Isle of Derek were conceived as a two-part drama. The developers argue that they chose the title "Nacah" as it is Hebrew for "adventure". In actuality, it does not mean adventure, though the similar word "Nachas" is Hebrew for "pleasure" or "enjoyment".

== Critical reception ==
=== Nacah ===
7Wolf said the title looks like what someone would expect a one-person project would look like. Just Adventure felt that for a 'garage game', it was of decent quality, and positively compared it to Comer. Mr Bill's Adventure Land felt the game could inspire contemporary developers to follow suit.

=== Derek and Isle of Derek ===
Family Friendly Gaming felt the game had beautiful graphics, particularly considering its year of release. Gameboomers thought that the game "oozing simplicity". Christian Centered Gamer felt the game was a little short, but that it had replay value. Adventurespiele felt it would appeal to a wider range of players than those who follow the Roman Catholic faith. Adventure Gamers said that one of the game's finer qualities is its pre-rendered 3D graphics. Alexander Tait of Just Adventure felt it was a "gem" of an indie game and the best Christian-themed title he had seen, and further commented that Isles of Derek is "hands down the best Christian game that has been made to date". Family Friendly Gaming compared the title to The Eyes of Ara. The Gamer placed it into an article titled "Heathens: 15 Ridiculously Terrible Religious Games", criticising its atmosphere, story, and trivia questions.
