= Donald Hamilton Fraser =

British painter

- Born: 30 July 1929
- Died: 2 September 2009 (aged 80); Henley on Thames, United Kingdom
- Known for: Painting; drawing

Donald Hamilton Fraser RA (30 July 1929, London – 2 September 2009), was a British artist famed for his abstract landscape paintings.

== Training and education ==
As an adolescent, Fraser attended the Maidenhead Grammar School in Berkshire, England. In the late 1940s, he worked at the Sunday Times as an editorial trainee while completing his National Service. From 1949 to 1952, Fraser trained at London's Saint Martin's School of Art together with contemporaries including Frank Auerbach, Sandra Blow, Sheila Fell, Leon Kossoff, Jack Smith, and Joe Tilson.

== Career ==
Anthony Blunt and John Piper were among assessors that awarded Hamilton Fraser a one-year French government scholarship in Paris in 1953. Also in 1953, his premier solo exhibition was given at Gimpel Fils, London. In 1955, Fraser returned to England and for 18 months extended his artist incoming by writing for Arts Review. Between 1953 and 1971 he had nine shows at Gimpel Filts, in 1967 at the Zurich-based Gimpel-Hanover Galerie, and Fraser even got eleven shows between 1958 and 1978 at the well known New York gallery, Paul Rosenberg. Carel Weight hired Fraser as a tutor at the Royal College of Art in 1958 where he continued until 1983 with fellow teachers Peter Blake and Julian Trevelyan. Fraser's students at the Royal included Patrick Caulfield, David Hockney, Ron B. Kitaj, and Thérèse Oulton.

== Art style and approach ==
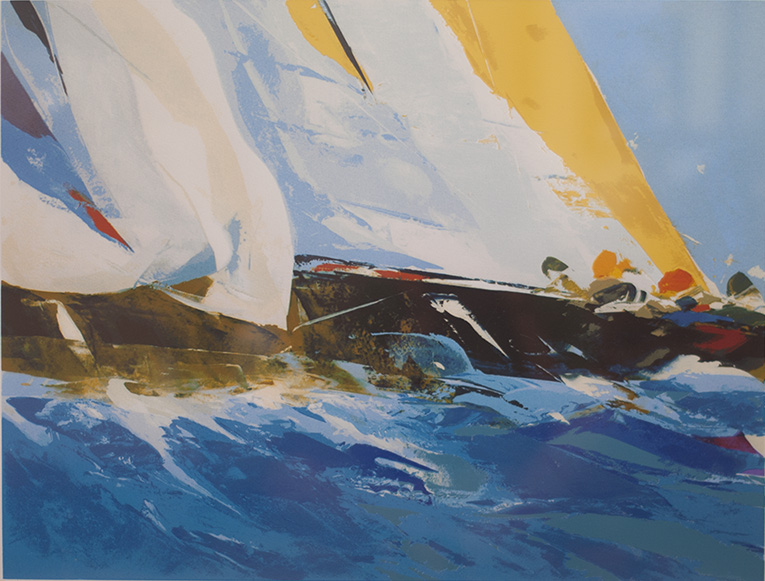
Loose Spinnaker by Fraser in 1996

Fraser's painting style was compared to that of Nicolas de Staël and characterised in the way he layered thick bright paint with a palette knife to produce a collage-like effect. The landscapes were still clearly identifiable while nonetheless forming abstract and almost dream-like fields of colour. Fraser also made chalk and wash drawing of dancers that contrasted in style with his paintings and highlighted his diverse talents.

Fraser said “An artist doesn't really choose what sort of pictures he paints. He paints what is there inside him. It is a sort of imperative.”

== Honours and distinctions ==
Fraser was elected a fellow at the Royal College of Art in 1970, becoming an Honorary Fellow in 1984. At the Royal Academy of Arts, he was also made an associate RA in 1975 and a full Royal Academician (RA) in 1985. Also at the Royal Academy, he was an Honorary Curator between 1992 and 1999, a Trustee between 1994 and 2000. From 1986 through 2000 he was a member of the Royal Fine Art Commission. He was on the council of the Artists' General Benevolent Fund starting in 1981 (as chairmen a few times in the 1980s). He was Vice-President of the Royal Overseas League beginning in 1986.

In 1983 Fraser designed four commemorative stamps for England celebrating 14 March as Commonwealth Day for the Commonwealth of Nations.

Fraser's work has been offered for sale in advertisements of The New York Times in 1985 and 1997.

== Personal life and death ==
Fraser was very tall.

Fraser met Judith Wentworth-Shields when he attended St Martin's. They married in 1954 at the British Embassy in Paris. Together they had one daughter.

Fraser also wrote as a ballet critic.

From 1969 until the time of his death, Fraser lived with his wife in a pair of converted cottages at Henley-on-Thames.

== Writings ==
- Gauguin's 'Vision after the Sermon'; Cassell, 1969
- Dancers: ballet paintings and drawings; Phaidon Press, London 1989 ISBN 978-0-7148-2581-6
