= Đerek =

Đerek (pronounced [d͡ʑěrek]) is a Croatian surname. Notable people with the surname include:

- Ana Đerek (born 1998), Croatian artistic gymnast
- Viktor Đerek (born 2000), Croatian photographer
