= Dirkx =

Dirkx is a surname. Notable people with the surname include:

- Austin Bibens-Dirkx (born 1985), American baseball player
- Jürgen Dirkx (born 1975), Dutch footballer
- Pieter Dirkx (born 1984), Belgian film director and painter

== See also ==
- Dirk (name)
