= Derek Tracey =

Irish association footballer (born 1971)

Personal information
- Date of birth: 6 April 1971 (age 55)
- Place of birth: Dublin, Ireland
- Position: Midfielder

Youth career
- –1989: Belvedere

Senior career*
Years	Team	Apps	(Gls)
1989–2006	Shamrock Rovers	392	(33)
- * Club domestic league appearances and goals

Derek Tracey (born 6 April 1971) is an Irish retired footballer who spent his entire 17 season senior career playing for Shamrock Rovers.

== Career ==
He made his debut on 9 August 1989 against St James's Gate F.C. in the Leinster Senior Cup. Tracey made his League of Ireland debut on 19 November 1989 against Dundalk as a substitute. He got his first start following week in Cork. His first goal was against University College Dublin A.F.C. in a 1-0 win on 13 February 1990. He was the club's top goalscorer in 1994–95 with 8 league goals.

He was ever present in the 1996-97 and 1997-98 seasons.

Derek made his 250th league appearance in a great 3-1 win over Bohemians on 19 September 1999.

On 26 May 2006, Tracey announced his retirement. During his time he made almost 500 senior appearances and as a versatile midfielder played in every position except goalkeeper. He played under 11 managers and scored once in 3 appearances in Europe

Derek scored 47 goals in 486 competitive appearances for The Hoops.

Derek was honoured with a Testimonial match in Tallaght Stadium on 5 November 2010.

== Sources ==
- Paul Doolan; Robert Goggins. The Hoops. ISBN 0-7171-2121-6.
