= Hesser =

Hesser is a surname. Notable people with the surname include:

- Amanda Hesser, American food writer for the New York Times Magazine
- Brennan Hesser (born 1980), American television actress
- David Hesser (1884–1908), American water polo player

Fictional characters:

- Carlo Hesser, character of the American soap opera One Life to Live
