= Dirk Kienscherf =

German politician (born 1965)

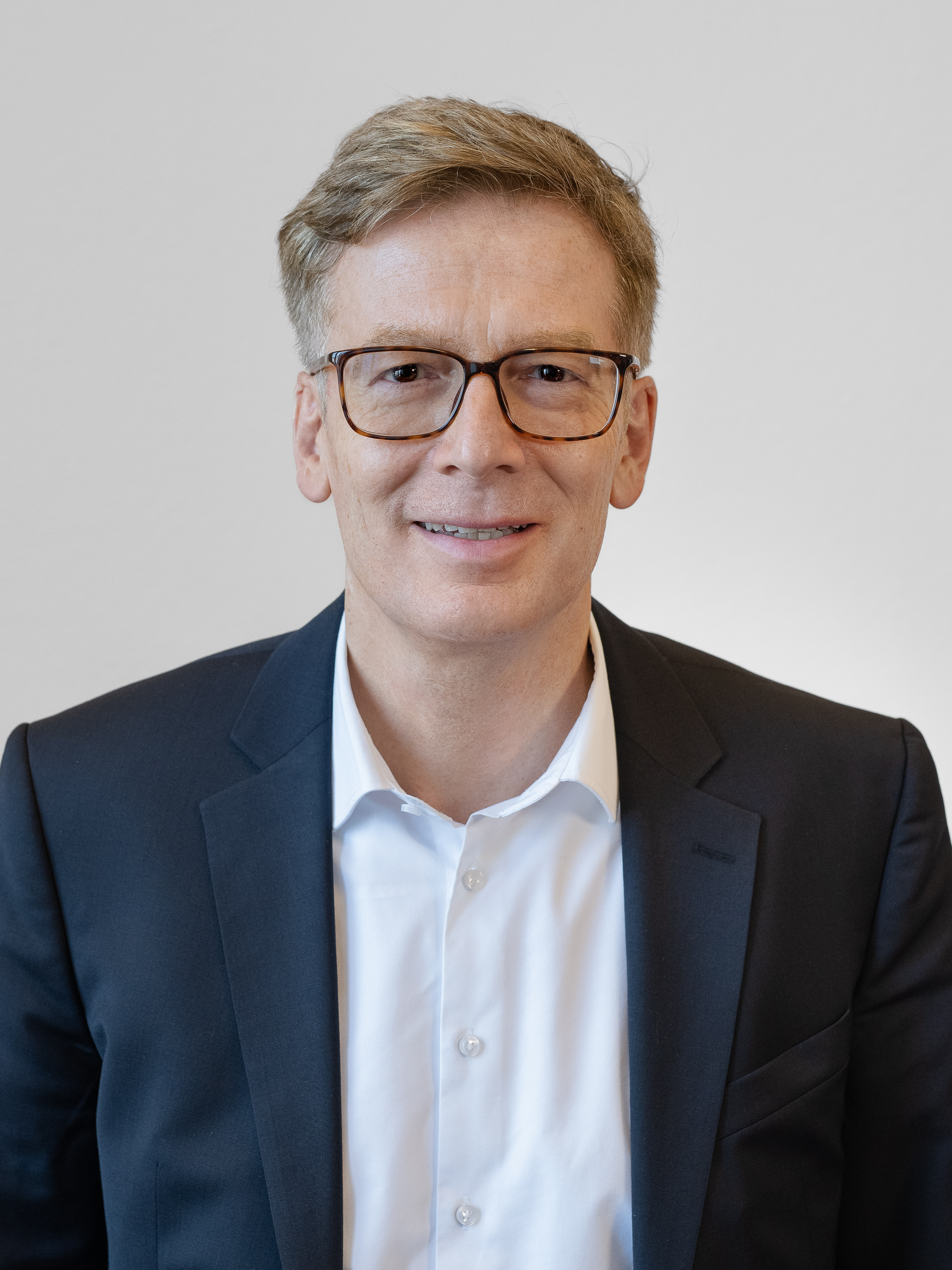
- Kienscherf in 2023

Member of the Hamburg Parliament
- Incumbent
- Assumed office 10 October 2001

Personal details
- Born: 20 December 1965 (age 60) Hamburg
- Party: Social Democratic Party (since 1989)

Dirk Kienscherf (born 20 December 1965 in Hamburg) is a German politician serving as a member of the Hamburg Parliament since 2001. He has served as group leader of the Social Democratic Party since 2018.
