= The Eyes of Ara =

2016 video game

- Developer: 100 Stones Interactive
- Publisher: 100 Stones Interactive
- Engine: Unity3D
- Platforms: Windows, macOS, Nintendo Switch
- Release: 2016
- Genre: Puzzle Adventure
- Mode: Single-player

The Eyes of Ara is a 2016 adventure game developed by the Brisbane-based, one-man independent games studio 100 Stones Interactive, founded by Ben Droste.

== Development ==
=== Conception ===
Droste is a Senior 3D Environment Artist and Level Designer, and was in the Australian gaming industry for ten years before making this game. He was inspired by games like Myst, in the sense of a being a character dropped into a strange world, not knowing why they were there or what was going on, and to start exploring and discovering; in addition he enjoyed how the game had no jumping or running or action.

=== Design ===
Droste wanted to make a game in which the environment was the central character, through a narrative technique known as environmental storytelling. The game was built using the Unity3D game engine. In escape the room types of games, players are either: physically confined (due to doors being locked) or alternatively confined (because there is nothing else to do in the chapter). In contrast, Droste's design is more open ended and non-linear. There is much interactively with the game world beyond items required to progress in the story; clicking on items like walls and chairs reveal sound effects like taps and knocks, accompanied by a visual spurt of dust, thereby adding life and age to the space. In addition, players have to realistically interact with tools in order to use them; e.g. turning a wheel or pulling a lever rather than clicking on it. Droste begins designing a level with pen and paper, marking out all the puzzles, secrets, and a proposed progression through the room; he may also look out for a physical feature that may make the room fit a puzzle he has previously designed. He later maps the puzzle out in a 3D space.

The complexity and ambiguity picked up by IGN was addressed by Droste in an interview: "[It] is the untrustworthiness of incomplete information and the importance of seeking out the truth. So all of the little bits of lore scattered around are designed to add to the overall story and history, but also give varying accounts of it. It's almost all incomplete information and sometimes even contradictory.”

=== Release ===
The game took three years to complete. It was released in mid-2016.

== Gameplay and plot ==
The player stumbles upon a medieval style castle, and begins to explore the rooms to uncover its secrets.

== Critical reception ==
Adventure Gamers praised the game for achieving an "extreme sense of pervasive isolation". which added to its timelessness. PC Gamer's Joe Donnelly noted that after the opening few screens, the puzzle become extremely difficult, but chose to persevere due to enjoying the game. Kotaku noted that it was essentially an "Aussie take on Myst". Just Adventure felt that despite the obscurity and difficulty of the puzzles and narrative, it was well-made and of a professional quality. PC Powerplay reviewer Meghann O'Neil noted that if it weren't part of her job, she wouldn't have had the time to sit down quietly and just listen, touch, read and explore, and she was grateful for the experience.
