= Derek Woodcock =

Australian rules football field umpire

Derek Woodcock is an Australian rules football field umpire in the Australian Football League. He has umpired 113 career games in the AFL.

He is also involved in cricket coaching at SACA.
