= Derek Stirling =

New Zealand cricketer (1961–2023)

Personal information
- Born: 5 October 1961; Upper Hutt, New Zealand
- Died: 13 December 2023 (aged 62)
- Batting: Right-handed
- Bowling: Right-arm fast-medium

International information
- National side: New Zealand (1984–1986)
- Test debut (cap 154): 16 November 1984 v Pakistan
- Last Test: 21 August 1986 v England
- ODI debut (cap 47): 31 March 1984 v Sri Lanka
- Last ODI: 7 December 1984 v Pakistan

Domestic team information
- Years: Team
- 1981/82–1987/88: Central Districts
- 1988/89–1992/93: Wellington

Career statistics
Competition	Test	ODI	FC	LA
Matches	6	6	84	65
Runs scored	108	21	1,651	547
Batting average	15.42	7.00	21.72	14.39
100s/50s	0/0	0/0	0/5	0/0
Top score	26	13*	75	44
Balls bowled	902	246	11,644	2,840
Wickets	13	6	206	90
Bowling average	46.23	34.50	33.72	22.26
5 wickets in innings	0	0	5	0
10 wickets in match	0	0	0	0
Best bowling	4/88	2/29	6/75	4/10
Catches/stumpings	1/–	3/–	27/–	17/–
- Source: Cricinfo, 16 April 2017

Derek Alexander Stirling (5 October 1961 – 13 December 2023) was a New Zealand cricketer who played in six Test matches and six One Day Internationals from 1984 to 1986.

== Biography ==
A right-arm fast-medium bowler, Stirling made his first-class deut for Central Districts in 1981–82 and his international debut for New Zealand in a One Day International against Sri Lanka on 31 March 1984. His Test debut followed, against Pakistan on 16 November 1984.

Stirling also played for Scottish club Stenhousemuir in 1983 and 1984, and for Yorkshire club Menston in 1985 and 1986 and for the Rest of the World XI in Scarborough in 1985.

Stirling and his American wife, Debbie, had three children. For four years from 1998, the family lived Oregon where they worked for and subsequently bought Debbie's mother's temporary staffing company.

Stirling died from cancer on 13 December 2023, at the age of 62.
