= Dirk Gringhuis =

American artist

Richard H. Gringhuis (September 22, 1918 – March 1974) was an American artist and illustrator. Born in Grand Rapids, Michigan, he studied from 1939 to 1941 at the American Academy of Art in Chicago, lived in New York for a year, then moved back to Michigan. He wrote and illustrated 28 books, half of them on Michigan history. He also was producer-host for the television series, “Open Door to Michigan.” He served as Curator of Exhibits at the Museum and associate professor in Elementary Education at Michigan State University. He received special awards for his work on Michigan, including the Governor's Award, A National Educational Television Award, and an Award of Merit from the Michigan Historical Society. He was closely associated, as a contract author and artist, with the Mackinac Island State Park system from 1958 until his death. During that time he wrote and illustrated four publications on the Mackinac region, illustrated many others and painted exhibit murals. Having moved to East Lansing in 1952, he painted the Michigan Folklore Mural at the East Lansing Public Library.

His books include Here Comes the Bookmobile (1952), Were-Wolves and Will-o-the-Wisps: French Tales of Mackinac Retold (1974), Lore of the Great Turtle (1970), and The Young Voyageur (1955). He illustrated three volumes in the Boxcar Children series by Gertrude Chandler Warner—#4, Mystery Ranch; #5, Mike's Mystery; and #6, Blue Bay Mystery.

He illustrated The Hidden Valley of Oz in 1951.

== Books written and illustrated ==
- Hope Haven: a tale of a Dutch boy and girl who found a new home in America (William B. Eerdmans, 1947)
- Tuliptime (A. Whitman, 1951)
- The Hidden Valley of Oz by Rachel Cosgrove (Reilly & Lee, 1951)
- Here Comes the Bookmobile (A. Whitman, 1952)
- The Young Voyageur (McGraw-Hill, 1955)
- The Eagle Pine (David McKay, 1958)
- Rock Oil To Rockets: The Story of Petroleum in America (Macmillan Publishers, 1960)
- Big Mac (Macmillan Publishers, 1961)
- Saddle the Storm (Bobbs-Merrill, 1962)
- Of Cabbages and Cattle: The Story of America's Farms (Dial Press, 1962)
- Big Dig: a Frontier Comes to Life (Dial Press, 1962)
- Of ships and fish and fishermen, (Our natural resources) (A. Whitman, 1963)
- Mystery at Skull Castle (Reilly & Lee, 1964)
- Open door to the Great Lakes (Duell, Sloan and Pearce, 1966)
- In scarlet and blue: The story of military uniforms in America (Dial Press, 1966)
- Stars on the Ceiling: the Planetarium Story (Meredith Press, 1967)
- Giants, Dragons and Gods: Constellations and Their Folklore (Meredith Press, 1968)
- Lore of the Great Turtle (Mackinac Island State Park Commission, 1970)
- The Great Parade: Tall Tales & True of Michigan's Past (Hillsdale Educational Publishers, 1970)
- Indian Costume at Mackinac: Seventeenth and Eighteenth Century (Mackinac Island State Park Commission, 1972)
- Were-Wolves and Will-o-the-Wisps: French Tales of Mackinac Retold (Mackinac State Historic Parks, 1974)
