= Pozzer =

Origin
- Region of origin: Italy, Veneto, Trentino-Alto Adige/Südtirol, Germany, Bavaria

Other names
- Variant forms: Posser, Pocer, Pozer, Pozera, Pozzera, Pozzerle, Fugazzer, Fugazzari, Fugacer, Fugazer, Fugazari, Fogazzaro, Brandeller, Brandeler, Bràndeler

Pozzer or Posser is a Northern Italian Germanic and Italic surname with origins in Veneto, Trentino, and Bavaria. Composed of the Venetian element pozzo- "well" and the Cimbrian element er- "from"/"of the". Derives from Fugazzer and Brandeller, being a mix of Venetian language and Cimbrian language.

== History ==
The territories of Valli del Pasubio, as evidenced by the primary names in the oldest documents, were frequented and perhaps permanently inhabited by Romance language populations before the arrival of the Bavarians. Though the immigration of German settlers have begun around 1100 (the imperial vassals between the X and XII demanded that unsafe areas were colonized and protected), the oldest document certifying the residence of the German settlers is from 1216, for Trentino territory. A document from 1225 attests that Jacopo da Lizzana, a Trentino squire, assigns 12 farms in the territory of Vallarsa (near Valli) to German-born settlers. In 1279 we find the first settlement (25 farms) documented for Valli's area. According to the documents, in 1400 the majority of the population speaks German. This is to say that the names and terms in German Cimbrian and Venetian language were often mixed, or used at the same time (this is the case of Brandeller, Fugazzer and Pozzer).

The official use of surnames, was born in 1564 with the requirement for parish priests to keep a register of births. Dalla Pozza, Dal Pozzo, Pozzani, Pozzati were preexisting Venetian surnames and Pozzer derives from a Cimbrian version of a pre-existent Venetian surname, maybe Dal Pozzo.

== Etymology ==
- Brandeller, from Cimbrian “brand” = fire
- Fugazzer, from Venetian “fogo” = fire
- Pozzer, from Venetian "pozzo" = well
- "er" is a Cimbrian suffix that means source (of the, by, from) or specifying a job or worker

== People with the name ==
- Diego Pozzer (born 2000), Visual Artist
- Alexandro Pozzer (born 1988), Brazilian handball player
- Célia Posser, São Tomé and Príncipe lawyer and politician
- Diether Posser (1922–2010, German politician

== See also ==
- Holy Roman Empire
- German Confederation
- Austrian Empire
- Kingdom of Lombardy–Venetia
- Third Italian War of Independence
- Austria-Hungary
- Kingdom of Italy
