= Derek Lodge =

English civil servant

Derek H A Lodge (1929 – July 1996) was an English civil servant who was most notable for his publications about various cricket subjects.

Derek Lodge was born in Lewisham, the second of three brothers. He worked for the Civil Service's Office of Arts and Librarians until his retirement in 1989 and later worked for two charities. A keen road runner, he completed eleven marathons, including the London Marathon on several occasions. He served as a Chiltern District councillor in Buckinghamshire rising to deputy leader and was also a lay preacher in Amersham.

He built a reputation as a compiler of cricket quiz questions and also edited the "Middlesex Annual Review" for several years. He served as the statistical officer (1974–1996) and as vice-chairman (1992–1996) of the Cricket Society.

He died from cancer in Amersham in July 1996, aged 67, leaving a widow and three daughters. The Council of Cricket Societies named its quiz trophy, the Derek Lodge Cup in his memory.

== Bibliography ==
- Figures on the Green, Allen & Unwin, 1982, ISBN 978-0-04-796061-1
- Question of Cricket, Unwin Paperbacks, 1983, ISBN 978-0-04-796070-3
- The Test Match Career of Ted Dexter, Spellmount Publishers Ltd, 1989, ISBN 978-1-871876-30-7
- The Test Match Career of Walter Hammond, Nutshell Publishing, 1990, ISBN 978-1-871876-10-9
- J.B. Hobbs, The Association of Cricket Statisticians and Historians, 1991, ISBN 978-0-947774-05-9
- P.B.H. May: His Record Innings-by-Innings (Famous Cricketers), The Association of Cricket Statisticians and Historians, 1995, ISBN 978-0-947774-46-2
- D.G. Bradman (Famous Cricketers), The Association of Cricket Statisticians and Historians, 1996, ISBN 978-0-947774-66-0
