= Dirk Müller (artist) =

Dutch sculptor

Dirk Müller (born 29 November 1946) is a Dutch sculptor.

== Gallery ==
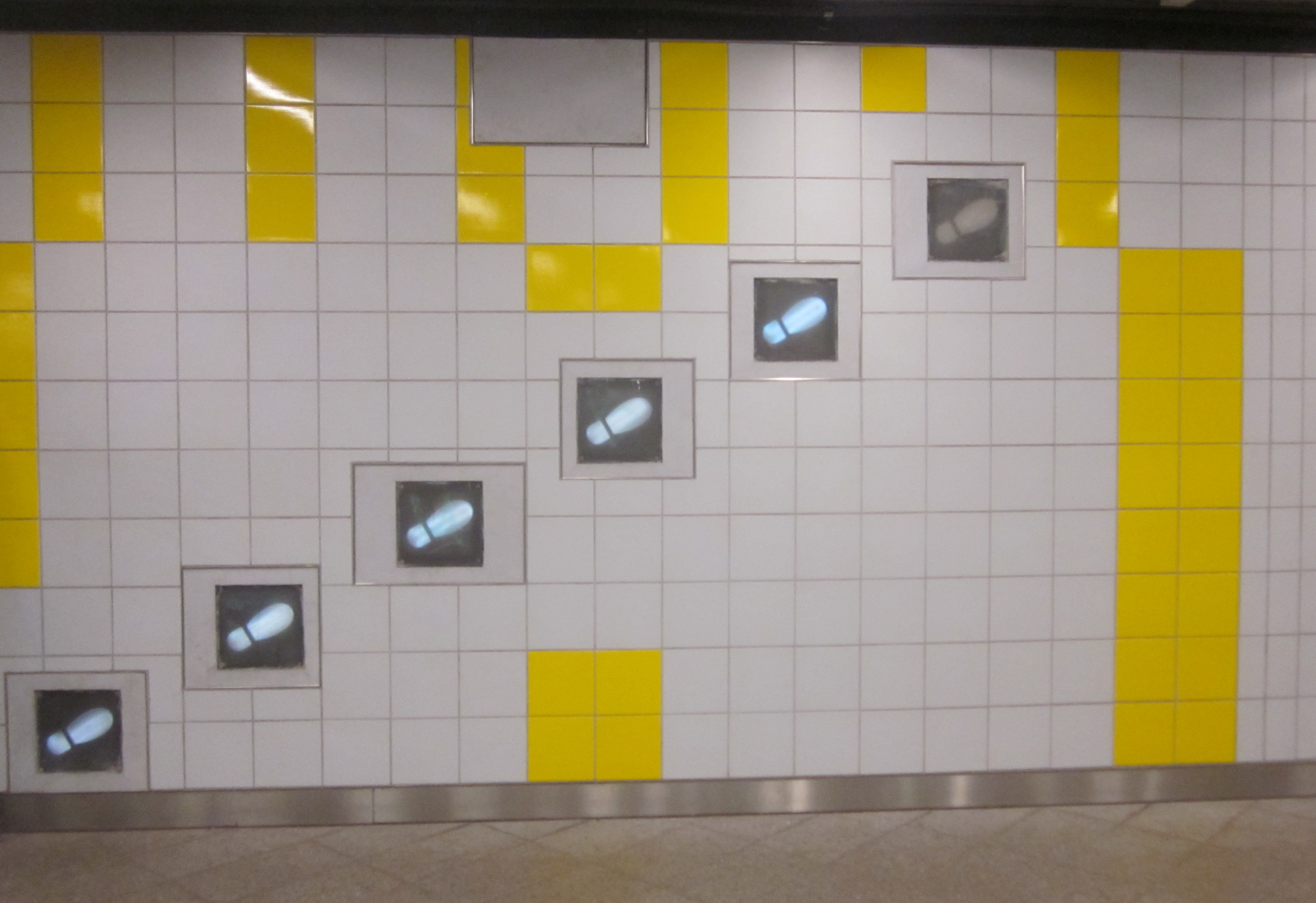
Voetstappen (1976), Amsterdam

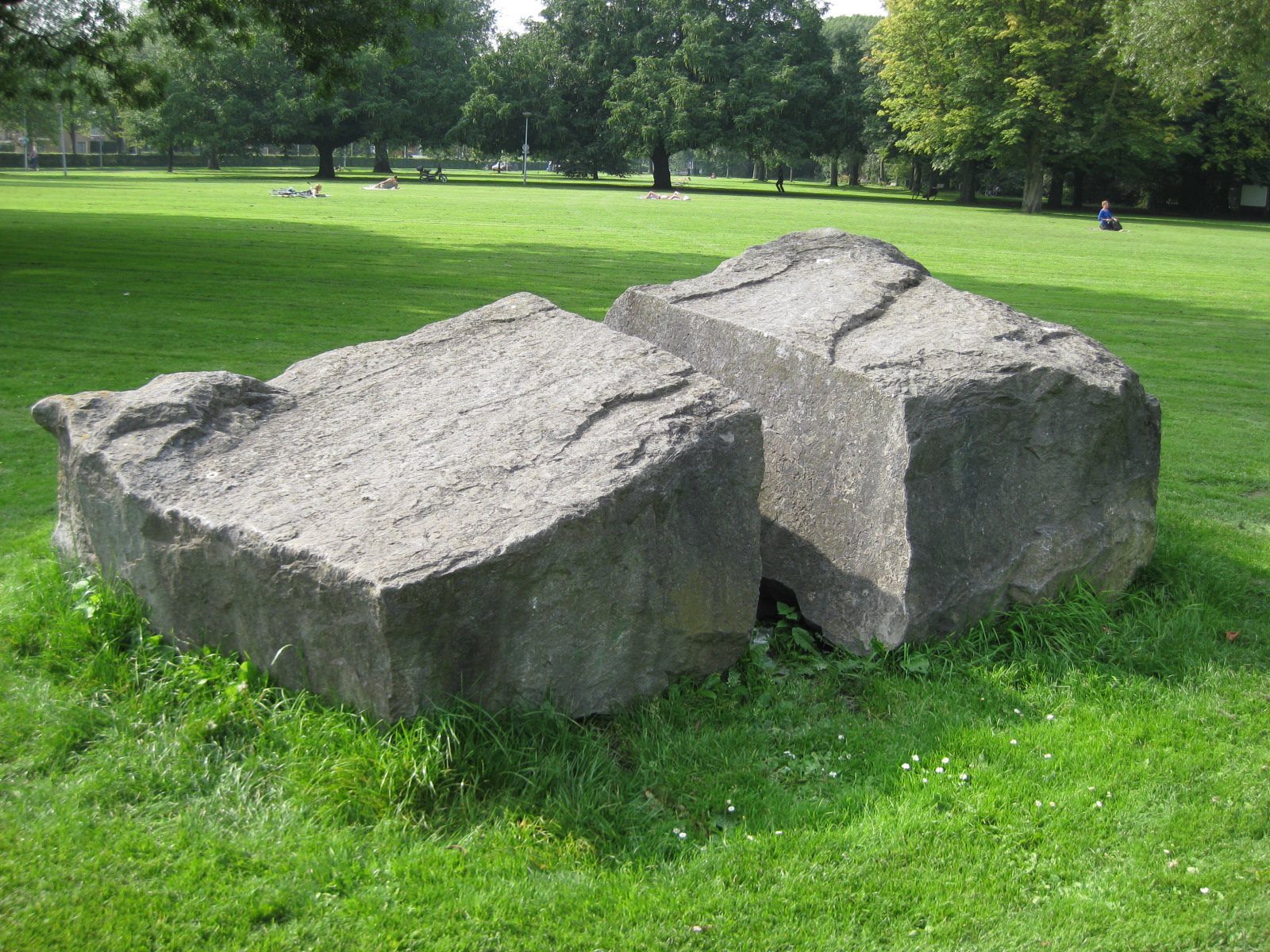
Steinplastik (1976), Amsterdam

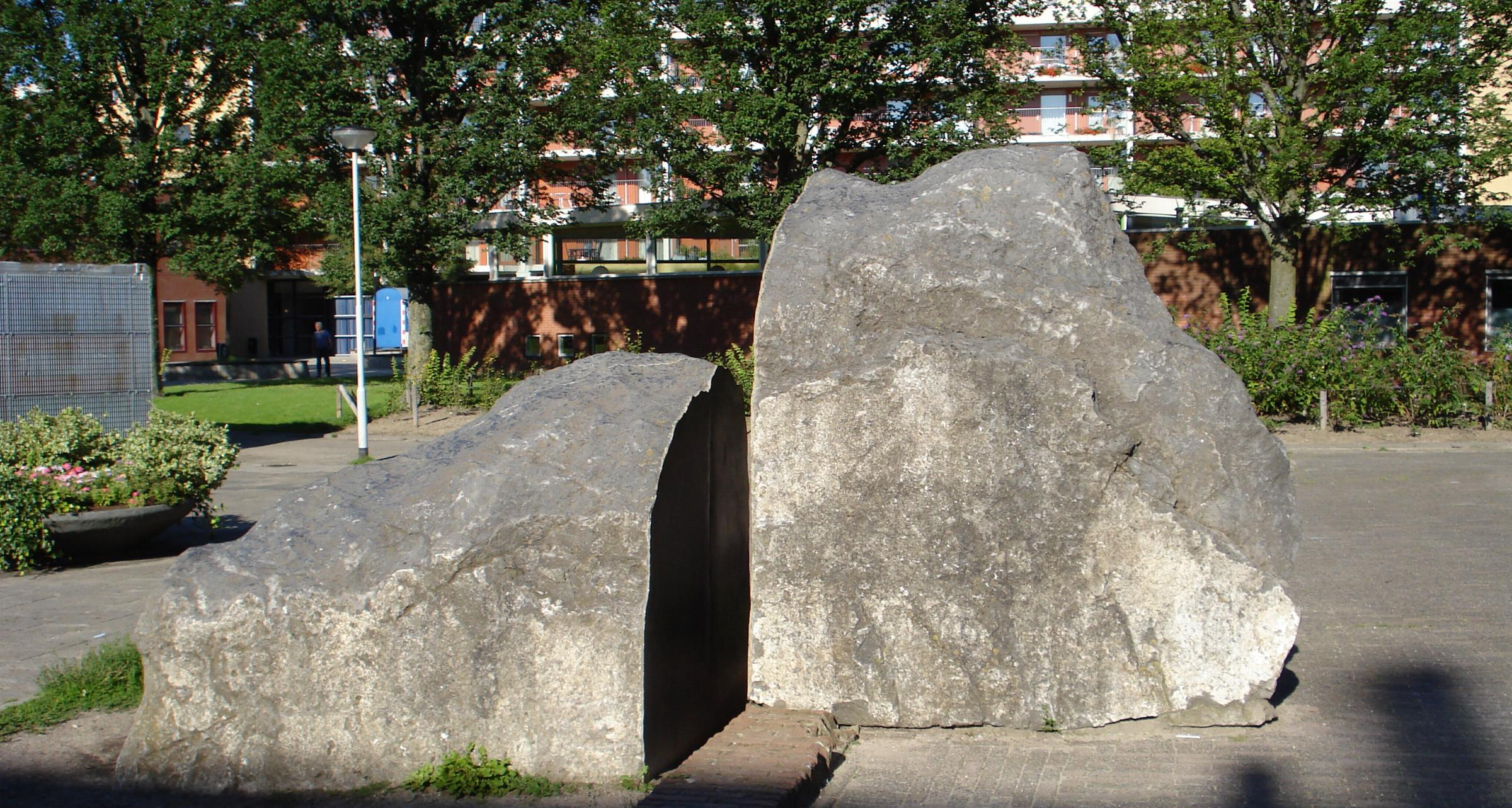
Twee kleidelen (1983), Rotterdam
