= Jane Claire Dirks-Edmunds =

American ecologist and biologist

- Born: June 9, 1912; Ozarks in Arkansas
- Died: December 29, 2003 (aged 91)
- Known for: Author of "Not Just Trees" and her research in Saddleback Mountain
- Scientific career
- Fields: American Ecologist and Biologist

Notes
- Retired as Professor Emerita, which is an honorary title given to someone who retired, but can still keep her academic rank status

Jane Claire Dirks-Edmunds (June 9, 1912 – December 29, 2003) was an American ecologist, biologist and author of Not Just Trees. She studied the Saddleback Mountain research site from 1935 to 1969.

== Early life ==
Dirks-Edmunds was born in the Ozarks of Arkansas in 1912, the youngest of ten children. Her parents, Linda Gates and Peter B. Dirks traveled in 1924 to Puget Sound, Washington State, finally settling in the Umpqua Valley of Oregon. In the prologue of her book Not Just Trees: The Legacy of a Douglas-fir Forest, she notes an early love of the Northwest's forests; this admiration continued through her academic years. Dirks-Edmunds attended Linfield College from 1932 to 1937, where she received her B.S. in biology.

== Professional career ==
After earning her Ph.D. at the University of Illinois, Dirks-Edmunds returned to Linfield College (now Linfield University) as an instructor of biology and assistant to the registrar: the first female Ph.D. hired by the institution. In 1944, she took a brief leave of absence from Linfield and spent three semesters at Whitworth College, serving as the head of the biology department. She returned to Linfield in 1946 and taught until her retirement in 1974 as professor emerita.

Dirks-Edmunds traveled to study other biotic communities: the Sonoran Desert, in 1967 and later in 1972, and a brief sojourn to Lake Atitlan and Guatemala's tropical forest.

Dirks-Edmunds later earned the title of Professor Emeritus, which is a title given to someone who was able to retire typically from a faculty position and is able to continue using that title.

=== Saddleback Research Site ===
This mountain in Oregon state, Lincoln County (commonly confused with the Saddle Mountain of Astoria.) was a project of Dr. Macnab, Dirks-Edmunds' mentor at Linfield. This hectare plot lay in the Coastal Mountain range. They studied the numerous organisms in the soil of the Douglas-fir and Hemlock community, with Dirks-Edmunds remaining at the site after Macnab retired from field research.

As the entire region was being encroached by logging throughout the 1900s, Dirks-Edmunds traveled to the research site to find the site logged for a second time. The area never recovered as an active mature forest, and was subject to fires afterward.

== Authorship ==
Her doctoral thesis, "A Comparison of the Biotic Communities of the Cedar-Hemlock and Oak-Hickory Associations," was published in Ecological Monographs for July, 1947. Dirks-Edmunds also worked with the Linfield Research Institute on various biological studies, including a published study on the Bronze Flea Beetle.

Following the death of her husband in 1983, Dirks-Edmunds revisited her Saddleback Mountain research and began to write Not Just Trees. Not Just Trees was published in 1999 and is an important text for the Northwest because it allows a glimpse into an ecological community of Saddleback mountain that no longer exists as a mature forest.

A member in the community of the First Baptist Church of McMinnville, she published a 125-year history, entitled Roots, Visions and Mission, published in 1992 at the request of the church's anniversary committee. She was also a contributor of short essays, poems, scientific papers and lectures.
