= Viktor Đerek =

Croatian photographer (born 2000)

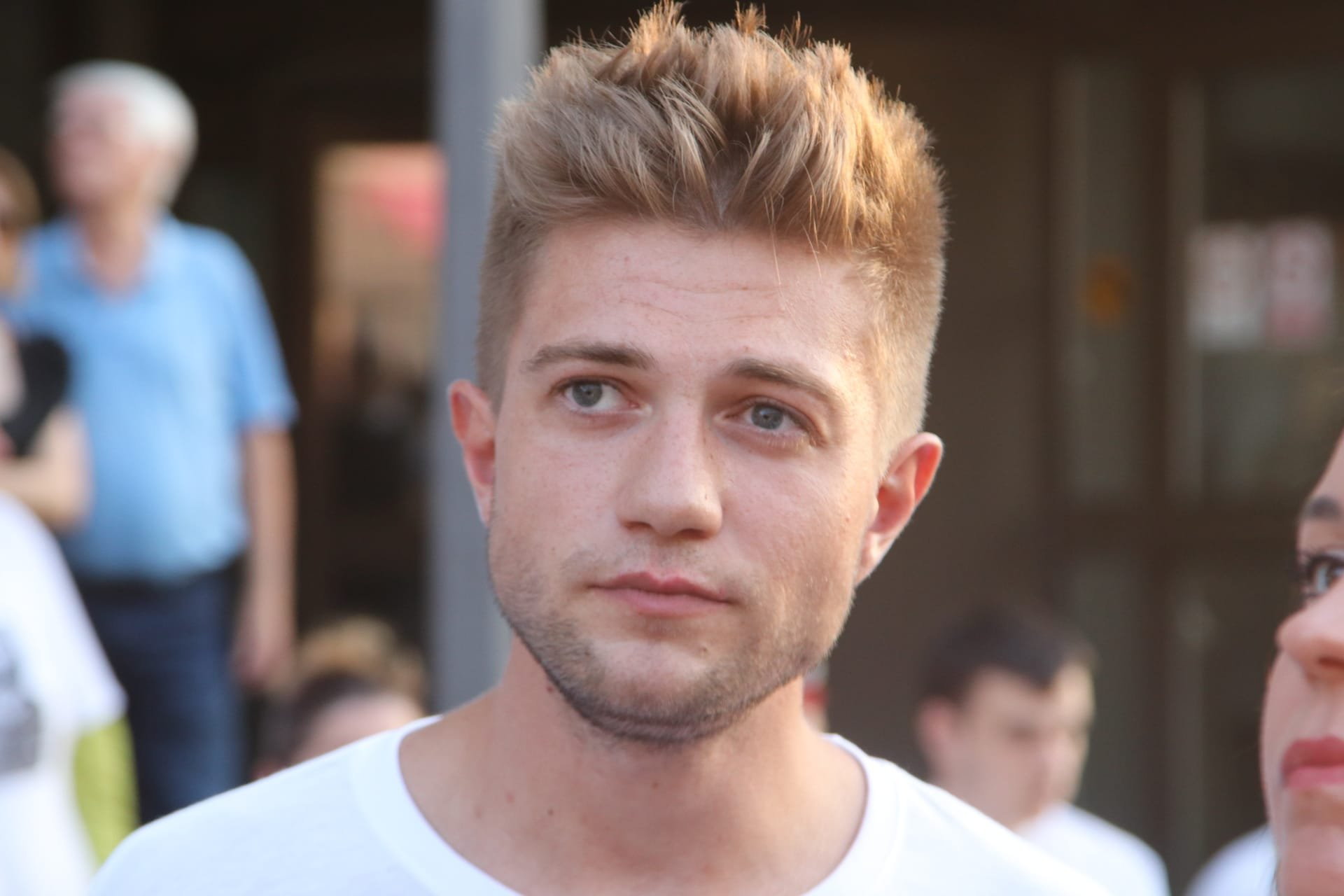
- 2024
- Born: March 8, 2000 (age 26); Split, Croatia
- Known for: Photography, writing

Viktor Đerek (born March 8, 2000) is a Croatian photographer. His work includes nature, landscape, portrait and historiographical subjects.

In 2013, he collaborated on a short documentary film that was used in an advertising campaign for a tourist organization.

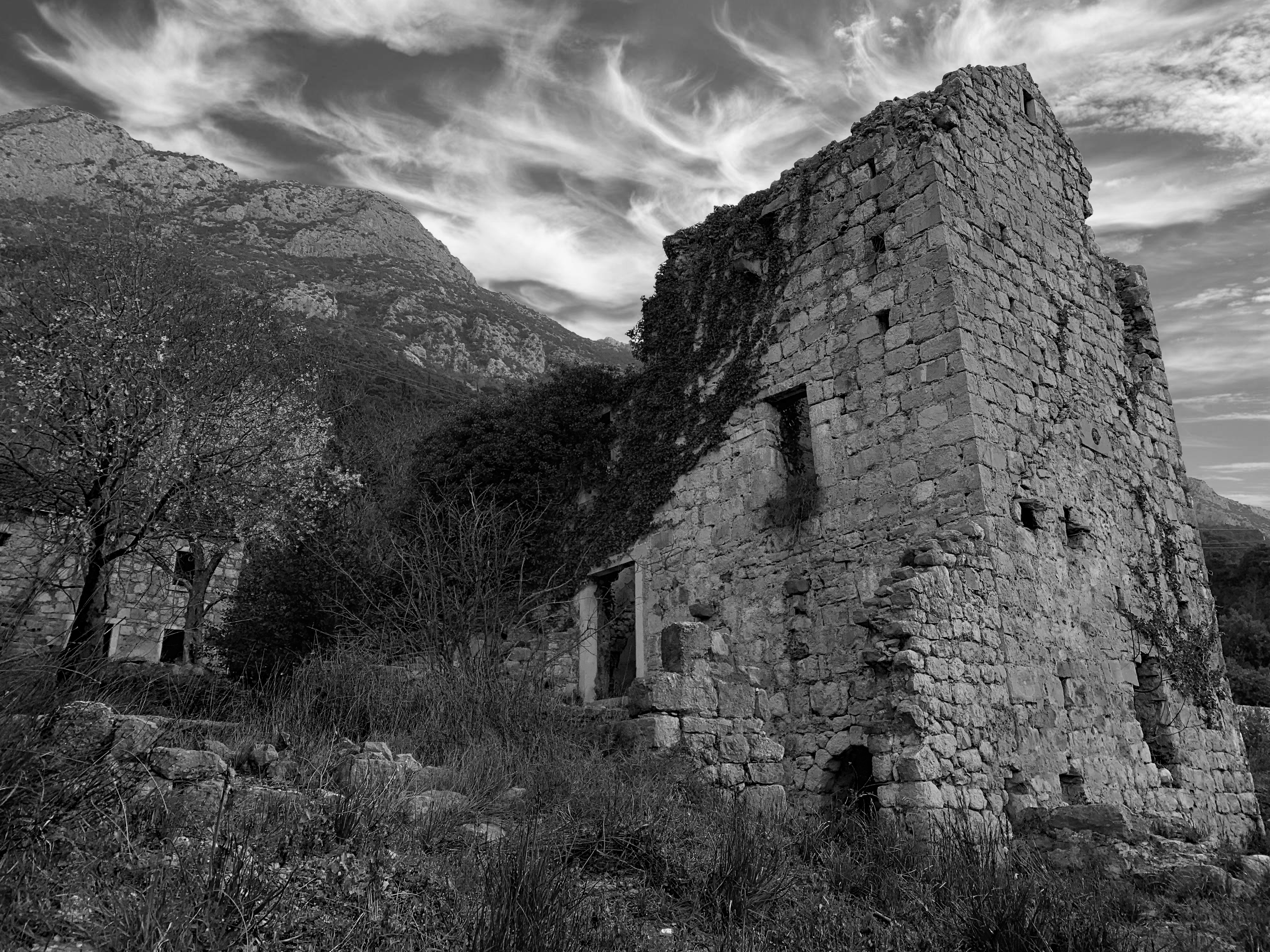
Antique house located in the village of Čista above Gradac, Croatia

== Biography ==
=== Early life and education ===
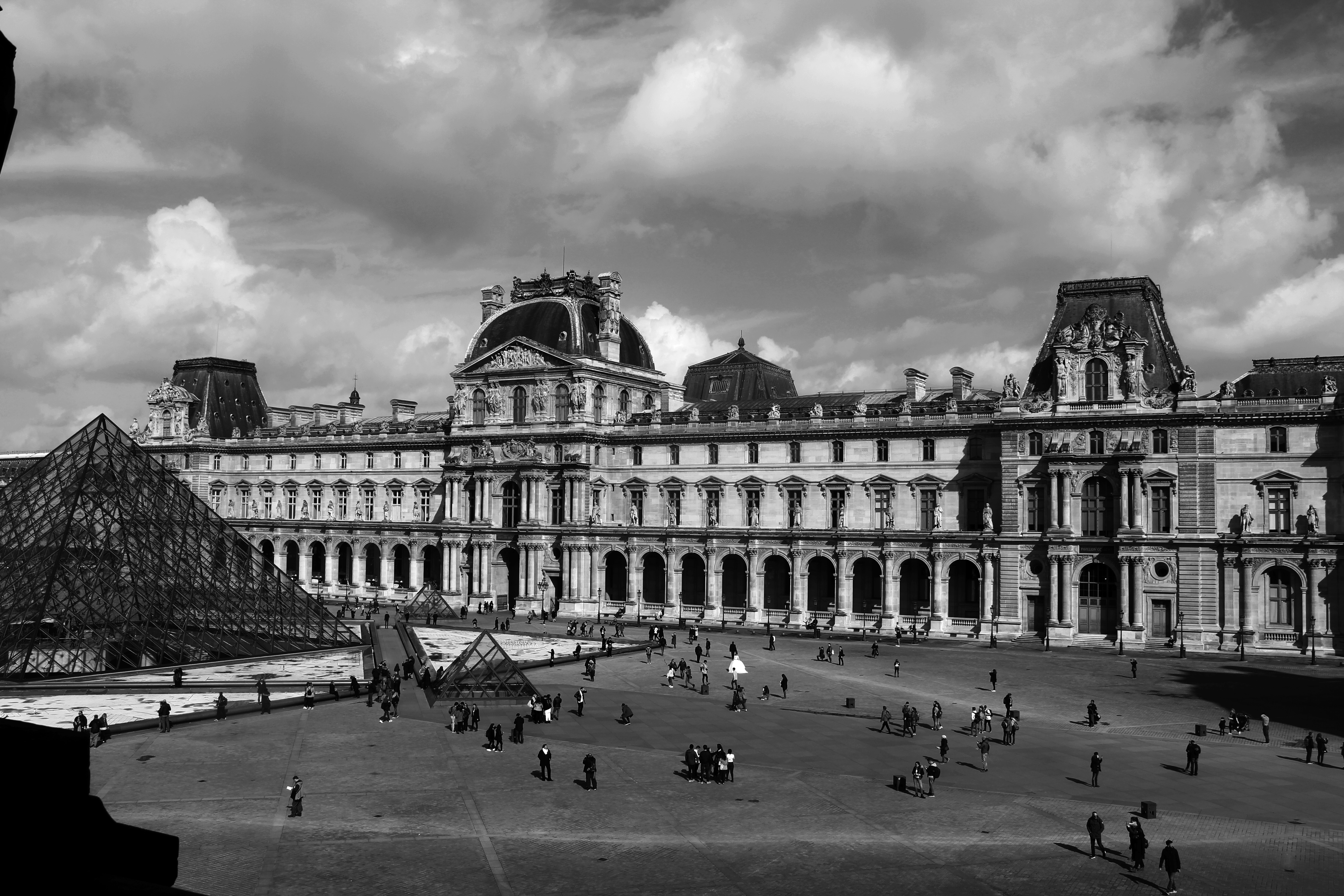
A black and white photo of the Louvre Museum

Viktor Đerek was born in Split on March 8, 2000. He had a younger brother Stjepan and younger sister Katarina. Đerek got involved in musical theatre at elementary school.

=== Work ===
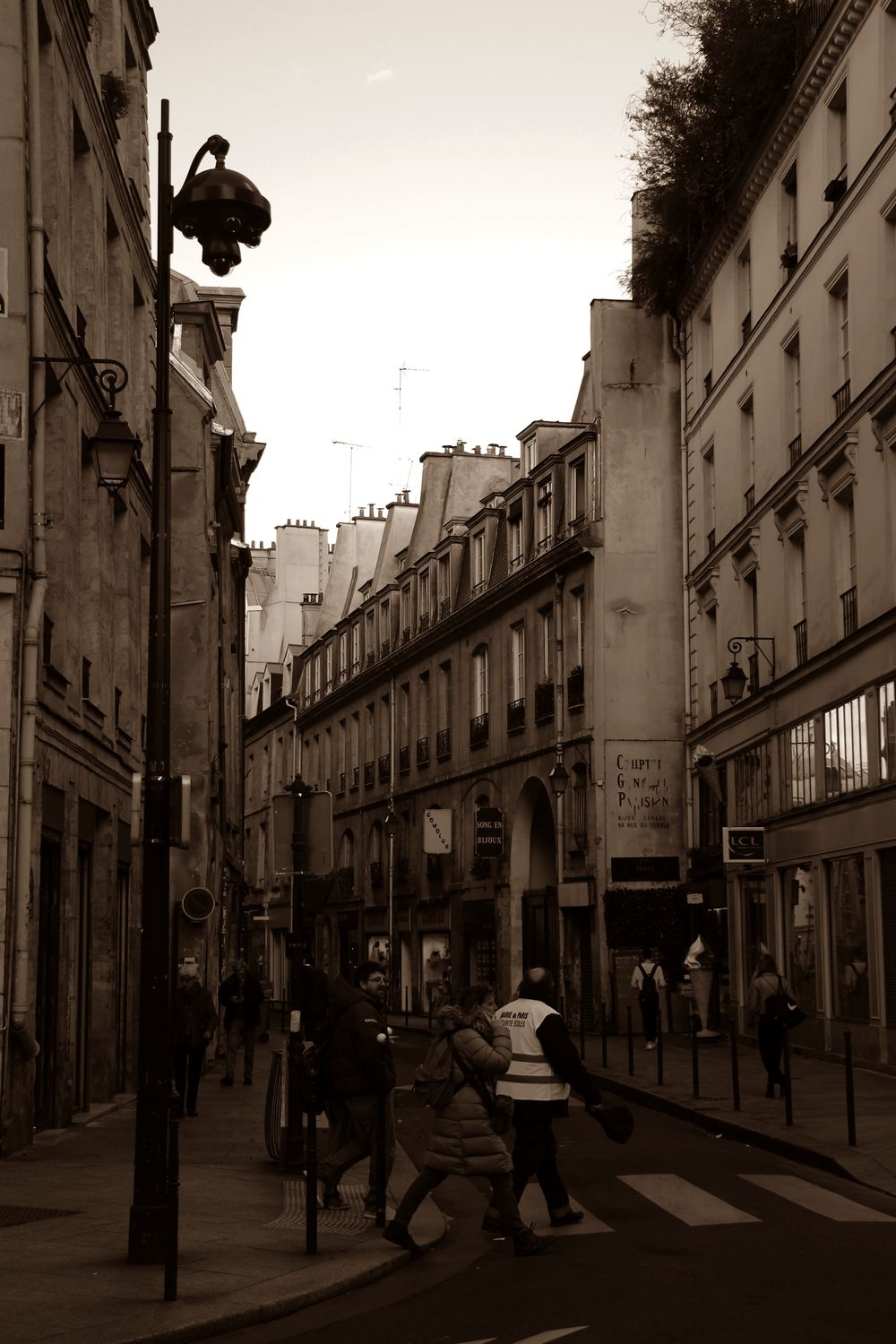
A street in Paris

Đerek gained an interest in photography at age 9 when he took a photography class. Afterward, he began travelling with his grandfather while taking photos independently and uploading them to the image hosting website Flickr. His love for photography was inspired by his grandfather.

In mid-2013, Đerek directed, produced and filmed his first short documentary film, Fairy Tale Croatia. The film includes footage of the city of Dubrovnik, Zadar, and Zagreb as well as footage of the National Park of Plitvice Lakes. Đerek has taken part in the pre-release promotion of the films Love, Simon and A Star is Born. A screening of Love, Simon was arranged in cooperation with Blitz-CineStar before its official release.

His photographs were published in a 2019 historical novel by author Milko Peko, entitled Grački boj.

== Short films ==
- Fairy Tale Croatia (2013)
- "Kako da Stanem?" (2014)

== Exhibitions ==
- Zajedno (Together), Zagreb, 2008.
