= Derek Erdman =

American artist (born 1973)

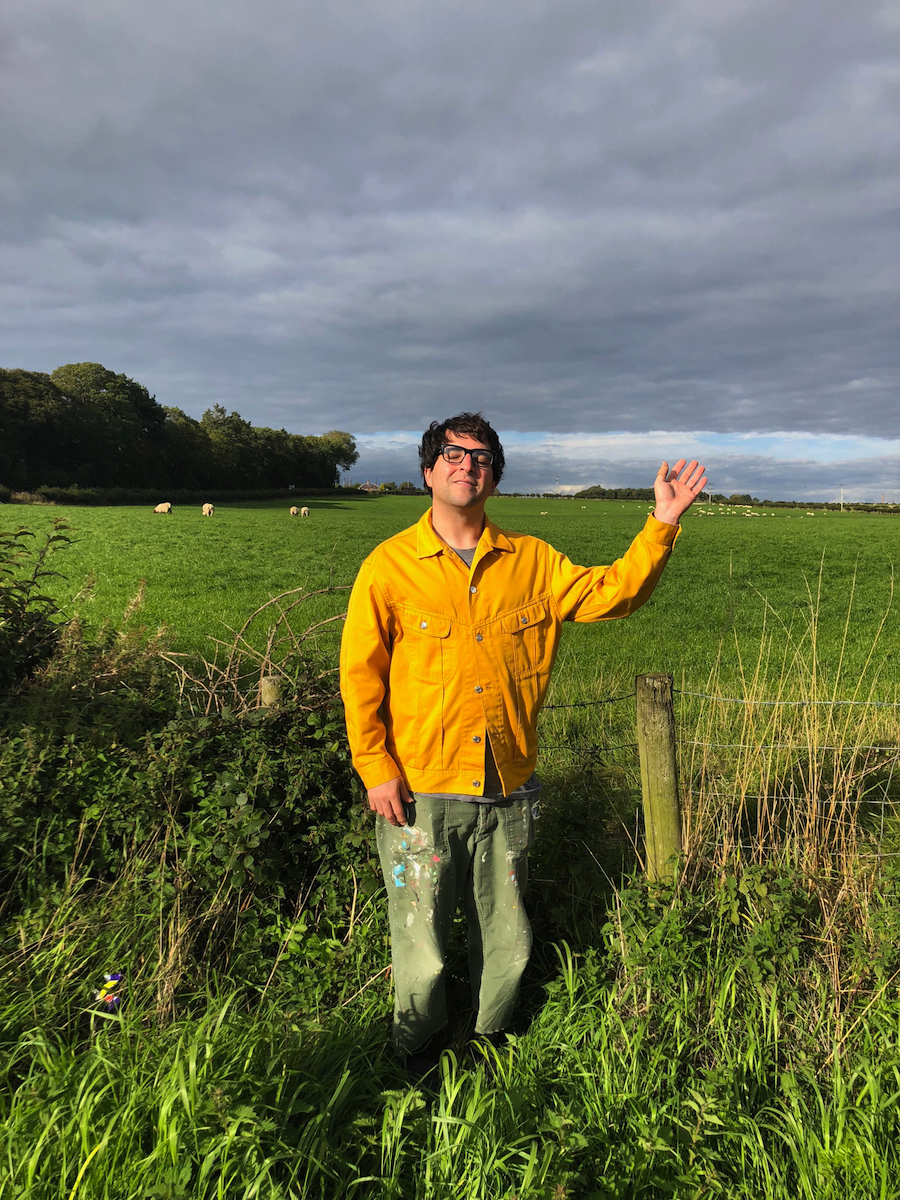
- Born: December 6, 1973 (age 52); Chicago, IL
- Occupations: Performance artist; painter
- Website: derekerdman.com

Derek Erdman (born December 6, 1973) is an American performance artist and painter from Chicago.

== Early life ==
Erdman was raised in Ohio by a single mother with what he has described as "very little stability" in his upbringing. He went to Kent State University to study English literature but dropped out after getting a job at Kinko's. He credits working at the copy shop with teaching him efficiency and the basics of graphic design. He published zines, contributed regularly to Seattle's The Stranger, and learned to paint by copying the clip art of Tom Tierney.

== Career ==
=== Artist ===
Erdman has made his living for most of his career as an artist, though he has held day jobs, including as receptionist at Sub Pop and at a civil rights law firm.

Erdman moved to Chicago in 1997 and began showing his art and selling his paintings from his home during art walks. He worked at record stores and eventually part-owned one, but sold his share in the store to sell his art full-time. His last solo exhibit in Chicago during that period took place in August 2010, after which he relocated to Seattle. In 2017 he moved back to Chicago, where he continued to exhibit his work.

He is a noted mail artist and runs a mail art Friend Club with over 2,300 members.

Erdman distributed the 1998 found-footage film Girls at the Carnival.

=== Hoaxster/Prankster/Provocateur ===
Erdman created many widely publicized hoaxes and pranks, such as purportedly selling Kurt Cobain's possessions on Craigslist, posting satirical posters around Chicago, and making prank calls to Real World cast members.

==== Rap Master Maurice ====
Erdman's revenge rap service, at one time "perhaps [his] flagship enterprise," worked as follows: if you had an incident or a problem with another person, you could pay Rap Master Maurice $17, and he would write a rap about your issue. Then he would deliver the rap in a phone call.

Rap Master Maurice was created when one of Erdman's friends was having a personal issue with a co-worker. The friend asked Erdman to give the co-worker a warning, which Erdman considered too threatening. Consequently, Erdman decided "perhaps i would do it in rap form". Erdman pursued the Rap Master Maurice act because he wanted to be more "service oriented" and "live off the things [he] made and not have to have another job."

==== Kathy McGinty ====
Kathy McGinty is an album of prank phone calls recorded by Erdman and a friend in 2002. The eponymous Kathy is actually a collection of pre-recorded phrases on a Yamaha SU10 sampler. Callers expecting to have phone sex with a young woman instead conversed with "Kathy," who repeats herself often, responds bizarrely to questions, and becomes increasingly unhinged as the calls progress.

Professor Jacob Smith of Northwestern University discussed the cultural significance of the Kathy McGinty calls in his 2008 book Vocal Tracks: Performance and Sound Media. He wrote that Kathy uses vocal performance "to explore the boundary between human and machine, and to search for the lines dividing technology, self, and performance."

In a 2002 BBC interview, Dan the Automator revealed that Kathy McGinty was the album he had most recently purchased.

== Personal life ==
Erdman was married to musician Emily Nokes for three years in the 2010s. The band Death Cab for Cutie mourned Erdman's departure from Seattle for Chicago in a song, You Moved Away. He now lives in Chicago in Logan Square.
