= Derek Smith (tight end) =

American football and basketball player (born 1980)

Profile
- Position: Tight end

Personal information
- Born: October 1, 1980 (age 46); Silver Grove, Kentucky, United States of America
- Listed height: 6 ft 6 in (1.98 m)
- Listed weight: 235 lb (107 kg)

Career information
- High school: Highlands (Fort Thomas, Kentucky)
- College: Kentucky
- NFL draft: 2002: undrafted

Career history
- Cincinnati Bengals(2002)*
- * Offseason or practice squad member only

Awards and highlights
- All-SEC tight end (2000)

Derek Smith (born October 1, 1980, in Silver Grove, Kentucky) is an American former football player who was a tight end for one season with the Cincinnati Bengals. Smith attended Ft. Thomas Highlands High School where he was later inducted into the Highlands Athletic Hall of Fame. Smith was also a standout in basketball, in high school he was a four-year starter and was first team All-State his last three years. As a football player, in high school, Smith was a 3-year starter and played on state championships his sophomore and senior years, being named first team All-State his junior and senior years.

Smith, a tight end, and quarterback Jared Lorenzen, formerly of the New York Giants, led Highlands to two Kentucky class 3A state championships. In a single game against rival Scott High School, Smith caught 7 passes for 325 yards and 5 receiving touchdowns, which is still a KHSAA state record.

Derek went on to play three years for the University of Kentucky Wildcats where he set many school and SEC records for a tight end. Smith left Kentucky after three years to enter the NFL draft. Listed at 6'6" 235 lb (107 kg). Smith signed with, and played one year, for the Cincinnati Bengals practice squad.
