= Derek Hopwood =

Derek Hopwood OBE (d. 23 March 2020) was an emeritus Fellow of St Antony's College, Oxford, and University Reader in Modern Middle Eastern Studies. Hopwood was the founding president Middle East Libraries Committee, a post which he kept until 1990. He was holder of the RISMES Award (2003) for Services to Middle Eastern Studies in Britain. He held visiting professorships at several international Universities, such as University of Provence, University of Khartoum, Ain Shams University, and Pennsylvania. He was also for several years director of the Middle East Centre (MEC) at St Antony's College.

== Publications ==
- Islam's Renewal: Reform or Revolt? (2018)
- Sexual Encounters in the Middle East: The British, the French and the Arabs (1999)
- Habib Bourguiba of Tunisia: The Tragedy of Longevity (1992)
- Egypt, Politics and Society, 1945–1990 (3rd edition 1991)
- Tales of Empire: The British in the Middle East (1989)
- Syria, 1945–1986: Politics and Society (1988)
- British Images of the Arabs (1980)
- The Russian Presence in Syria and Palestine, 1843-1914: Church and Politics in the Near East (1969)
