= Dirck Pesser =

Dutch businessman

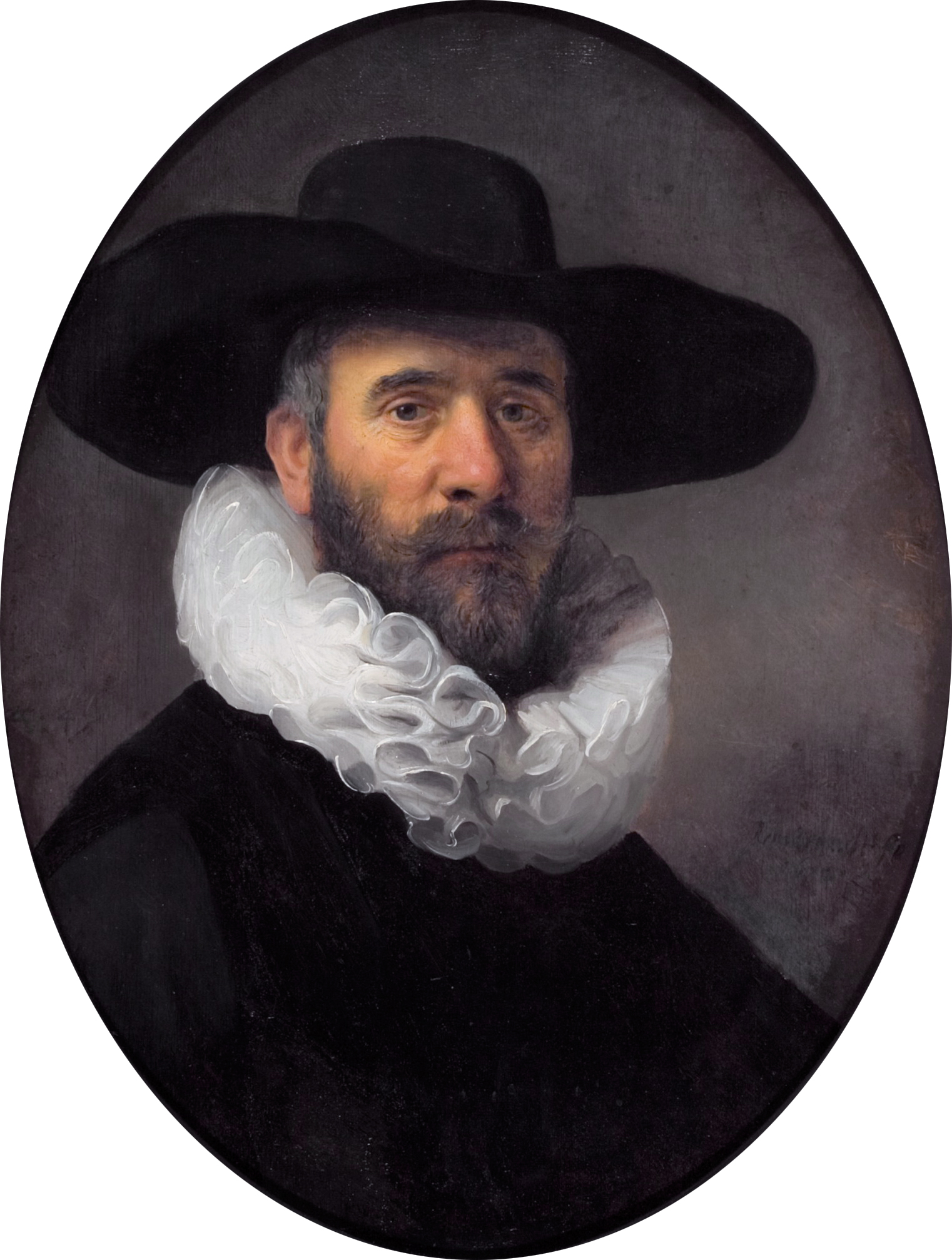
Portrait of Dirck Pesser aged 47 in 1634, by Rembrandt

Dirck Jansz Pesser (c. 1585 - buried September 3, 1651) was a Dutch brewer from Rotterdam, best known today for his portrait by Rembrandt. He was an important member of the Rotterdam Remonstrant community in the early 17th century.

He was the son of the brewer Jan Dammasz Pesser, who had founded the brewery "De Witte Leeuw" (The White Lion) at the end of the 16th century at the Leuvehaven in Rotterdam. On December 18, 1612 Dirck married Haesje Jacobs van Cleyburg. Dirck's older brother Dammas took over his father's brewery, and Dirk himself founded in 1619 the brewery "De Zwarte Leeuw" (The Black Lion, a lion was featured in the Pesser family's coat of arms) in four buildings on the Wijnstraat (Wine Street) near the Wijnhaven (Wine Harbor).

Dirck and his wife Haesje van Cleyburg, who he had married in Brielle on 18 December 1612, posed for the famous Dutch artist Rembrandt Harmensz van Rijn 22 years later in 1634. The painting of Dirck is in the collection of the Los Angeles County Museum of Art. The pendant to this picture of Pesser's wife is in the Rijksmuseum in Amsterdam.

== Rembrandt portrait ==
Hofstede de Groot documented Dirck's portrait as being tampered with by 1910, when he wrote: "739. A MAN IN A LARGE SLOUCH HAT, said to be a member of the Raman family. Half-length, without hands; life size. He is turned to the right and looks at the spectator. He has a dark brown beard and moustache, a narrow pleated collar, and a black coat. [Pendant to 882.] Signed to the right above the shoulder, "Rembrandt f. 1634"; oak panel, originally ten-sided with edges added later, 26 1/2 inches by 20 1/2 inches. In the possession of F. Kleinberger, Paris. In the collection of the late A. de Ridder, Frankfort-on-Main, 1910 catalogue, p. 35."

Despite the extra pieces being added on, he documented the woman (now called Haesje) as the pendant and wrote "882. A WOMAN IN A BROAD RUFF. Bode 260; Dut. 278; Wb. 207; B.-HdG. 119. About twenty-five. Half-length, without hands; life size. She is turned to the left, and looks straight out of the picture. She has a very ruddy complexion. Her hair is combed back, and almost covered by a plain white cap. She wears a plain dark stuff gown, trimmed with black velvet. Bright daylight falls from the left foreground. Greyish background. [Pendant to 739.] Signed to the right in the background, "Rembrandt f. 1636"; oak panel, ten-sided, with the corners added later, 27 inches by 21 inches. Mentioned by Bode, p. 405; Dutuit, p. 45; Michel, p. 559 [433]; Hofstede de Groot, Oud Holland, xi. p. 228. In the collection of Lord Kinnaird, Rossie Priory."

== Wedding pendants ==
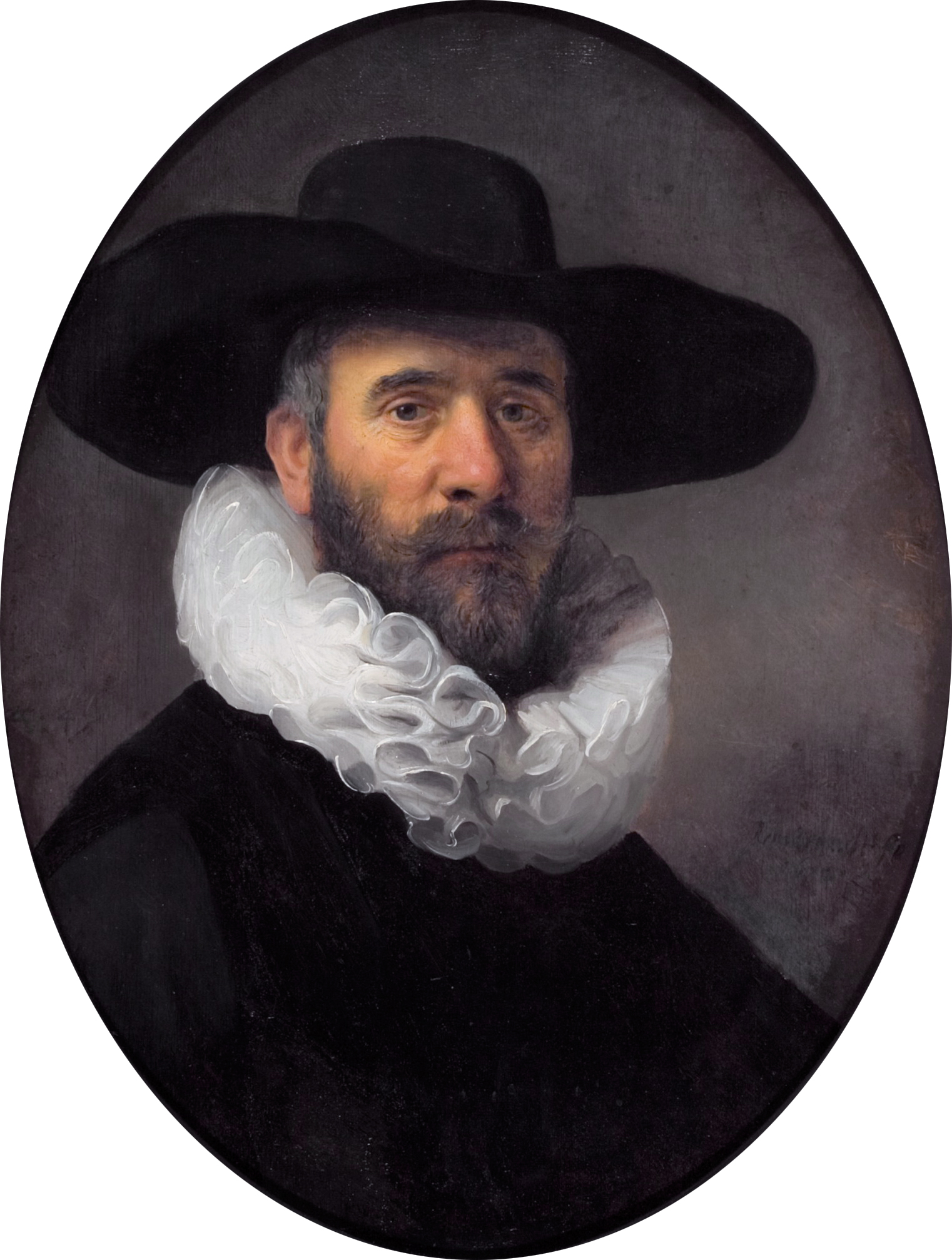

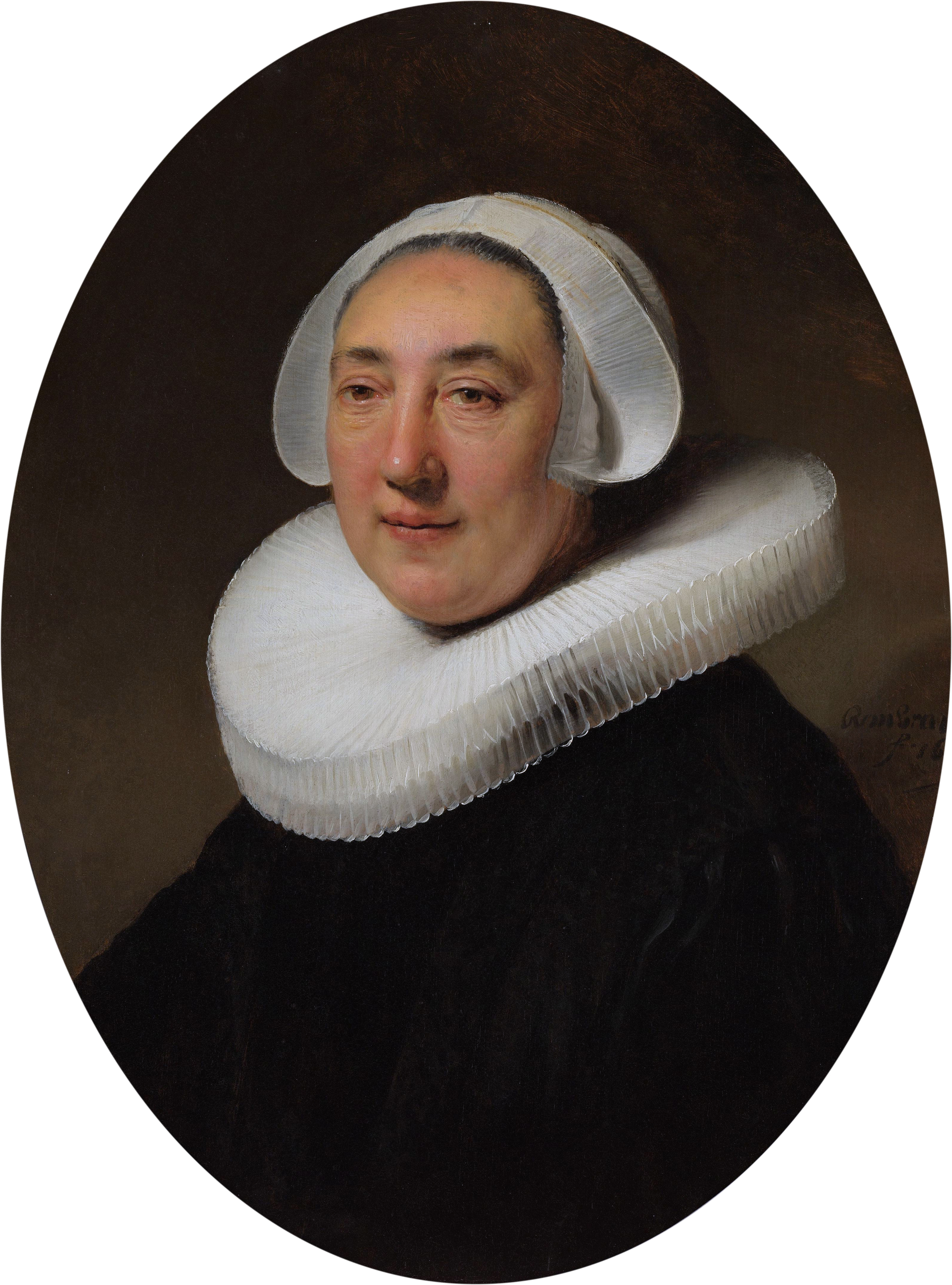

Rembrandt also painted Dirck's widowed mother Aechje Claes Horst (Aechje Pesser), at the age of 83, which is in the National Gallery, London. Some claim that this portrait is the actual pendant to Dirck Pesser's portrait, and it has been dated to the same year. Possibly all three were commissioned at the same time for use in the brewery on the occasion of a 25-year jubileum of Dirck's directorship. At the time Hofstede de Groot was writing, this painting was considered to be of a Francoise van Wassenhoven, a name which he rejected, but included for reference when he wrote: "856. A WOMAN OF EIGHTY-THREE (officially catalogued as Portrait of an Old Lady). Sm. 490 and 590; Bode 181; Dut. 238 and 265; Wb. 132; B.-HdG. 106. Half-length, without hands; life size. She is seen in full face, looking out of the picture. She wears a plain gown of deep black, a narrow run 1 ", and a white cap with the standing out. Light background. Full light falls from the left in front. Signed to the right above the shoulder, "Rembrandt f. 1634," and inscribed to the left,"AE S VE (the last two letters joined) 83"; oval oak panel, 27 inches by 21 inches. An old copy is in the collection of the Marquess of Linlithgow, Hopetoun House, Waagen, iii. 311. Engraved in mezzotint by J. Stolker and inscribed, "Avia"; also by C. H. Hodges. Etched by J. de Frey and Rajon. Copied in Indian ink by J. Stolker with the apocryphal inscription, "Francoise van Wassenhoven". Mentioned by Vosmaer, pp. 147, 504; Bode, p. 404; Dutuit, pp. 31, 57; Michel, p. 150 [115-6, 431]; Waagen, i. 264.

Exhibited at the British Institution, London, 1835, No. 50 : lent by William Wells of Redleaf. Sale - K. van Winkel and others, Rotterdam, October 20, 1791, No. 6. In the possession of the Amsterdam dealer Roos. Sale - S. Erard, Paris, April 23, 1831, No. 121 (4000 francs); as "Rembrandt's Mother." In the collection of William Wells, Redleaf, 1836 (Sm.). Sale - W. Wells, London, May 12, 1848 (Lb. 252, C.L. Eastlake); according to a MS. note by Sm. in his own copy of his catalogue. In the collection of Sir C. L. Eastlake, London; bought from his widow in 1867 for the National Gallery (for Lb.1200). In the National Gallery, London, 1911 catalogue, No. 775"

== Mother and son pendants? ==
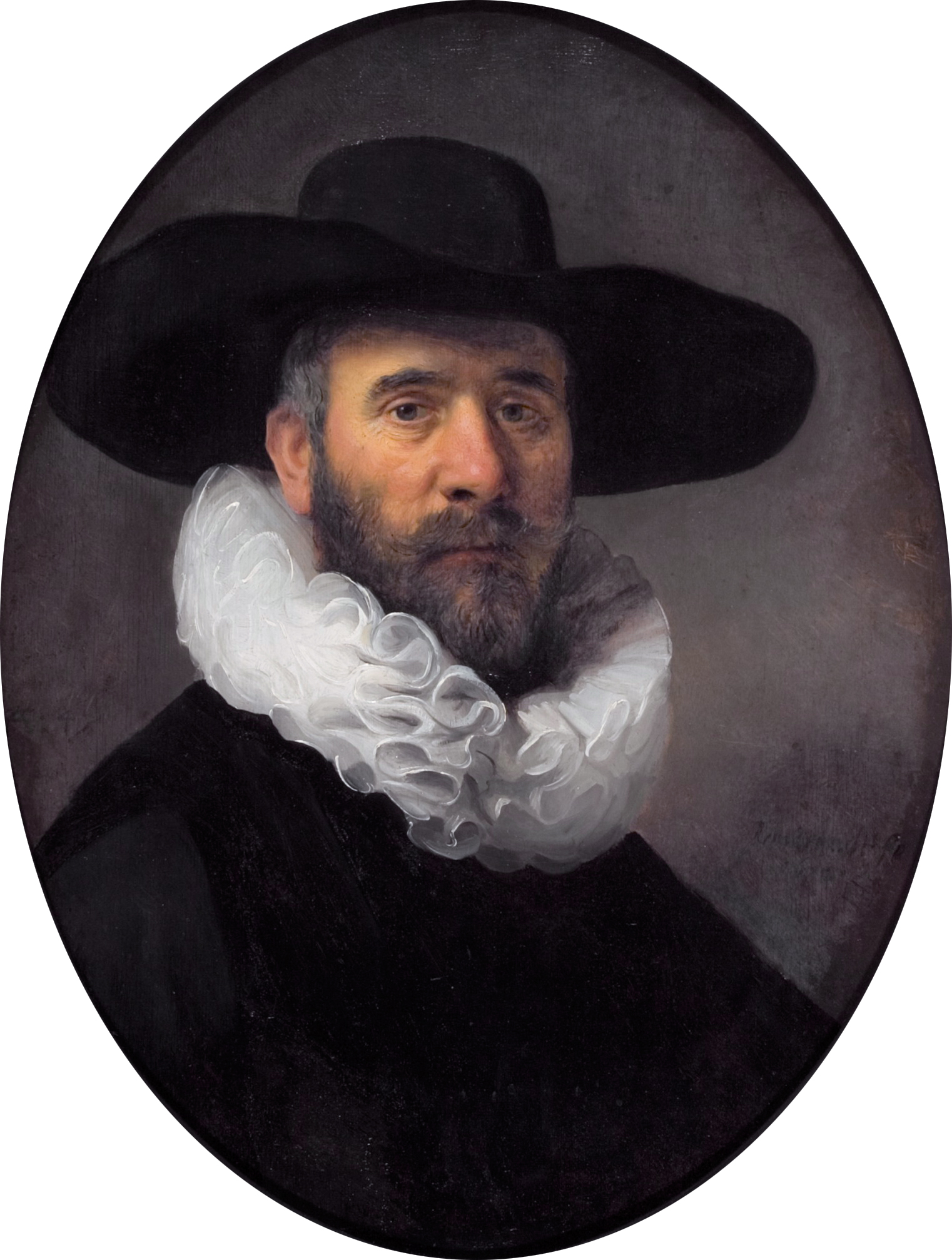

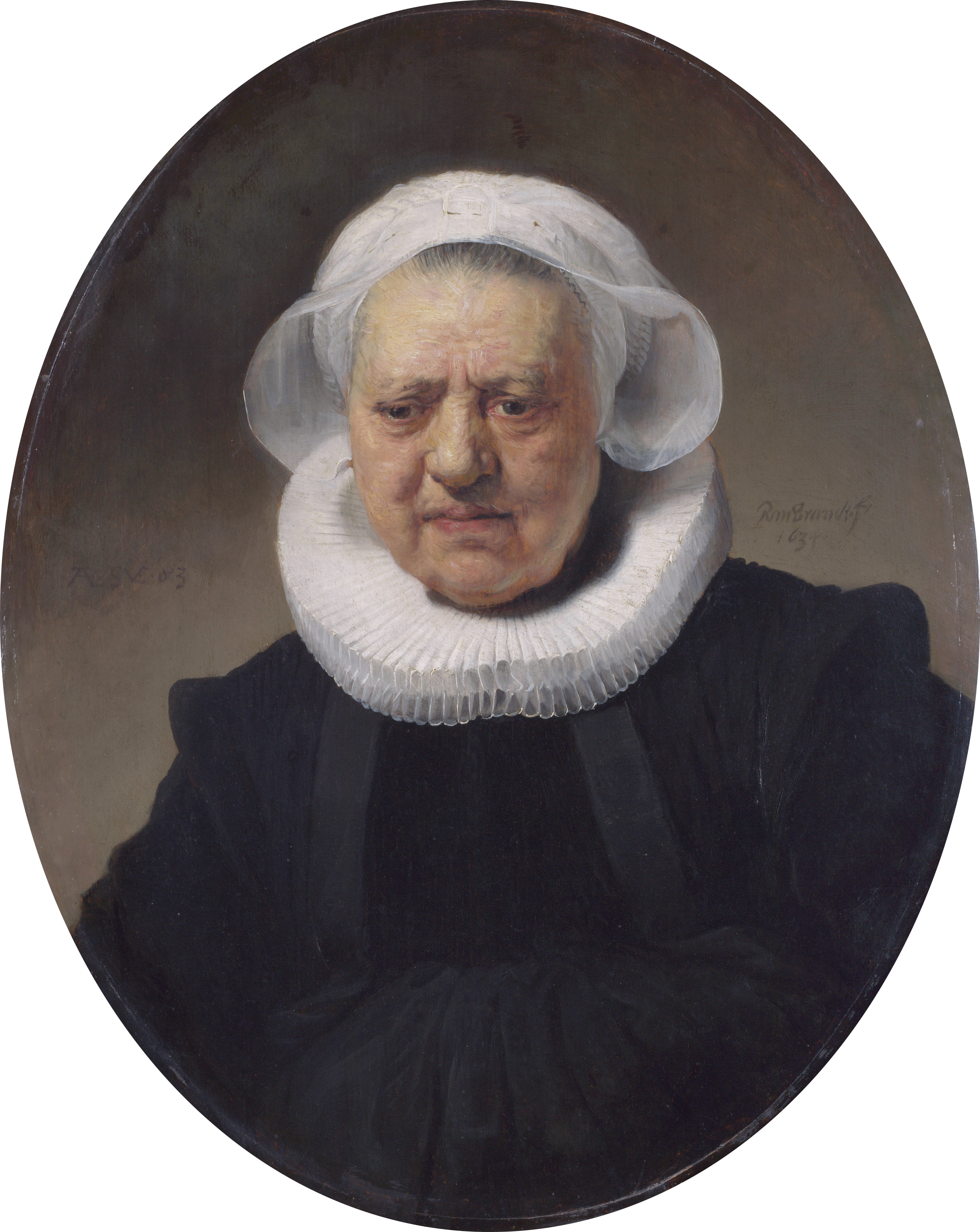

== Sources ==
- History of the "De Zwarte Leeuw" brewery (in Dutch)
- Rotterdam City Archives genealogical data
