= Derek (surname) =

Derek is a surname. Notable people with the surname include:

- Bo Derek (born 1956), American actress, film producer and model, fourth wife of John Derek
- Jenny Derek, Australian model
- John Derek (1926–1998), American actor, director, screenwriter, producer and photographer, born Derek Delevan Harris
