= Derek Hallworth =

British television director

Derek J. Hallworth is a British television director. Regular credits include Countdown and Mastermind.

== See also ==
- List of British game shows
