= Dietrich =

Dietrich (German pronunciation: [ˈdiːtʁɪç]) is an ancient Germanic dithematic name meaning "ruler of the people". It may be both a given name and a surname.

== Given name ==
- Thierry of Alsace (German: Dietrich; 1099–1168), Count of Flanders
- Dietrich, Count of Oldenburg (c. 1398–1440)
- Dietrich of Ringelheim (9th century), Saxon count and father of St Matilda
- Dietrich Bonhoeffer (1906–1945), German Lutheran pastor and theologian
- Wilhelm Dietrich von Buddenbrock (1672–1757), Prussian field marshal and cavalry leader
- Dieterich Buxtehude (c. 1637/39–1707), Danish-German composer and organist
- Dietrich von Choltitz (1894–1966), German General and last commander of Nazi-occupied Paris in 1944
- Dietrich Eckart (1868–1923), German politician
- Dietrich Enns (born 1991), American baseball player
- Dietrich Fischer-Dieskau (1925–2012), German baritone singer
- Dietrich Grunewald (1916–2003), Swedish American artist and designer
- Dietrich von Hildebrand (1889–1977), German Catholic philosopher and theologian
- Dietrich Hollinderbäumer (born 1942), German-Swedish actor
- Dietrich Keller (born 1943), German retired basketball player
- Dietrich Mateschitz (1944-2022), Austrian businessman, co-founder of Red Bull
- Dietrich Mattausch (born 1940), German actor
- Dietrich Opitz (1901–1992), German assyriologist
- Dietrich Reinkingk (1590–1664), German constitutional lawyer and politician
- Dietrich von Saucken (1892–1980), German general
- Dietrich Stobbe (1938–2011), German politician
- Dietrich Thurau (born 1954), German cyclist
- Dietrich Wortmann (1884–1952), German wrestler

== Surname ==
- Albert Dietrich (1829–1908), German composer and conductor
- Albert Gottfried Dietrich (1795–1856), German botanist
- Amalie Dietrich (1821–1891), German naturalist and museum collector
- August Dietrich (1858–?), American politician
- Brandon Dietrich (born 1978), Canadian ice hockey player
- Brenda Dietrich (born 1953), American politician from Kansas
- Charles H. Dietrich (1853–1924), American politician from Nebraska
- Craig Dietrich (born 1980), American digital artist and educator
- Dena Dietrich (1928–2020), American actress
- Derek Dietrich (born 1989), American baseball player
- Fritz Dietrich (1905–1945), German musicologist and composer
- Fritz Dietrich (Nazi) (1898–1948), German Nazi SS officer executed for war crimes
- Gabriele Dietrich (born 1943), German-Indian scholar and philosopher
- Guillermo Dietrich (born 1969), Argentine politician
- Hermann Dietrich (1879–1954), German politician
- Jacob Dietrich (1857–1932), American politician
- John H. Dietrich (1878–1957), Unitarian humanist minister
- Klaus Dietrich (born 1974), Austrian footballer
- Louise Dietrich (1878–1962), American nurse
- Marlene Dietrich (1901–1992), German-American actress, singer and entertainer
- Otto Dietrich (1897–1952), German SS officer
- Philippe Friedrich Dietrich (1748–1793), French scientist and politician
- Sepp Dietrich (1892–1966), German Waffen-SS general
- Suzy Dietrich (1926–2015), American amateur sports car racing driver
- Tyler Dietrich (born 1984), Canadian ice hockey coach
- Wilhelm Dietrich (1911–1944), German Waffen SS major
- William E. Dietrich (born 1950), American geomorphologist
- William S. Dietrich II (1938–2011), American industrialist and philanthropist
- Yevgeny Dietrich (born 1973), Russian politician

== Fictional characters ==
- Ian Dietrich, member of the Garrison Regiment in the series Attack on Titan
- Dietrich von Bern, hero of Germanic legend based on Dietrich the Great
- Colonel Dietrich, Nazi colonel in Raiders of the Lost Ark
- Arthur Dietrich, erudite police detective from the ABC sitcom Barney Miller
- Dietrich, a claymore soldier having the rank 8 in the manga Claymore
- Dietrich Zimmermann, a soldier in the Alan Gratz novel Allies
- Dietrich von Lohengrin, an antagonist in the Trinity Blood light novel series and its anime adaptation.
- Dietrich Kluge, the fictional leader of the Illuminati in the Netflix adult animated series Inside Job
- Dietrich Gregor Lamine, a protagonist from the video game Fire Emblem: Fortune's Weave

== See also ==
- Dietrich v The Queen, case in the High Court of Australia
- Lorraine-Dietrich, French automobile and aircraft engine manufacturer
- Derek
- Derrick
- Detrick (disambiguation)
- Diderik
- Diederich
- Diederik
- Diedrich
- Dieter (disambiguation)
- Dieterich
- Dietrick
- Theodoric
- Thierry (disambiguation)
