= Didrichsen =

Didrichsen is a Norwegian and Danish surname. It may originate as a patronym of the Nordic name Didrich, itself related to Didrik, Diederik and Dietrich. It is most prevalent in Norway and Denmark.

Notable people with this surname include:

- Elias Didrichsen (1824–1888), Norwegian politician
- Ferdinand Didrichsen (1814–1887), Danish botanist and physicist
- Lauren Didrichsen, married name of Lauren-Marie Taylor (born 1961), American actress
