= Deatrick =

Deatrick is a surname. Notable people with the surname include:

- Eugene Peyton Deatrick (1924–2020), United States Air Force colonel, test pilot, and combat veteran
- Janet A. Deatrick, American professor of nursing

== See also ==
- Deatrick Nichols (born 1994), gridiron football cornerback
- Detrick (disambiguation)
- Dietrich (disambiguation)
