= Diederich =

Diederich is both a German surname and a masculine German given name. Notable people with the name include:

== Surname ==
- Benjamin W. Diederich (1903–1974), American politician
- Bernard Diederich (1926–2020) American author, journalist and historian
- Bim Diederich (1922–2012), Luxembourgish cyclist
- François Diederich (1952–2020), Luxembourgish chemist
- Jason Diederich, Australian Paralympic swimmer
- Nils Diederich (born 1934), German politician
- Paul Diederich (born 1959), Luxembourgish mycologist
- August Diederich (born 1997), German musician and rapper who goes by the stage name Ski Aggu

== Given name ==
- Diederich Hinrichsen (born 1939), German mathematician
- Diederich Krug (1821–1880), German classical pianist and composer

== See also ==
- Diederich College of Communication, primary college at Marquette University in Milwaukee, Wisconsin
- Diederichs
- Dietrich
- Diedrich
- Dieterich
