= Gabriel Lekegian =

Armenian photographer in Ottoman Egypt (1853–1920)

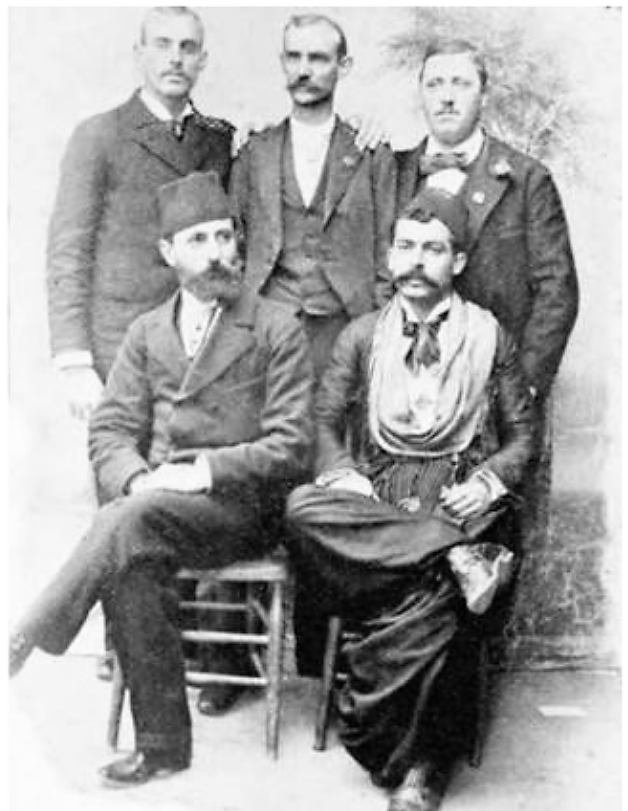
- Photographers G. Lekegian (sitting on the left) and J. Farah, Cairo, with assistants
- Born: 1853
- Died: 1920 (aged 66–67)
- Occupation(s): photographer, painter
- Years active: 1880-1920
- Known for: photography of Ottoman Egypt

Gabriel Lekegian (1853 – c. 1920), also known as G. Lékégian, was an ethnic Armenian painter and photographer, active in Constantinople and Cairo from the 1880s to the 1920s. Little is known about his life, but he left an important body of work under the name of his studio ‘Photographie Artistique G. Lekegian & Cie’. With a large number of now historical photographs of Ottoman Egypt, he documented the country at the turn of the 19th century. Among other collections, his photographs are held in the New York Public Library and the Victoria and Albert Museum, London.

== Biography ==
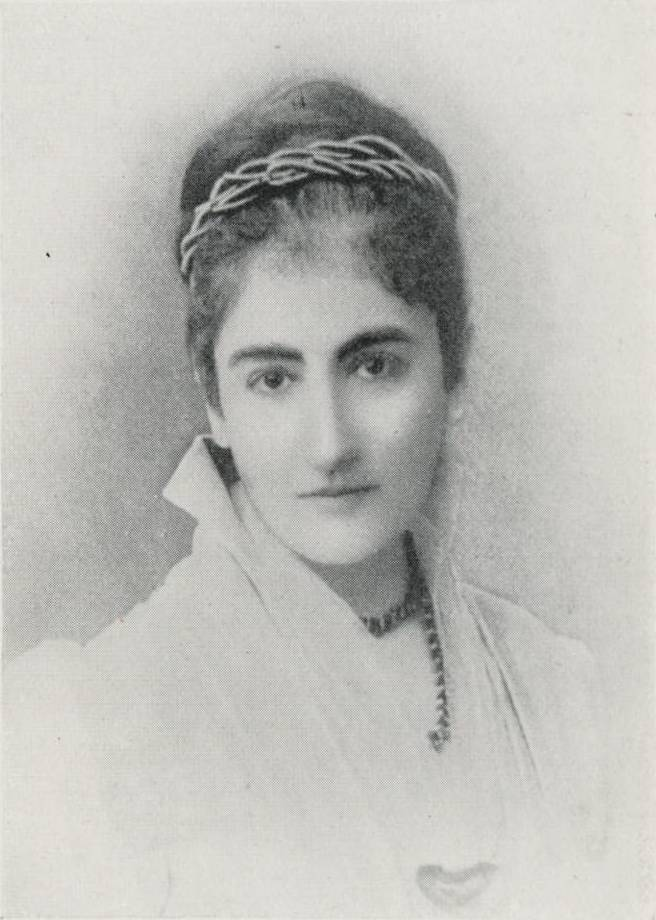
Princess Nazli of Egypt (1906)

Around 1880, Lekegian was based in Constantinople, now Istanbul, and at the time the capital of the Ottoman Empire, where he was a student of the Italian expatriate painter Salvatore Valeri. Working with watercolours, Lekegian produced a series of figurative and genre studies in the detailed style of his teacher, displaying Orientalist tendencies borrowed from Valeri and French academic painter Jean-Léon Gerome. Lekegian's paintings were exhibited in Constantinople in 1881 and 1885 in London. Very few of these, such as his painting of a palace guard or a woman with a water jug in Constantinople, are known to have survived.

Upon his move to Cairo, he apprenticed in one of the Armenian or Greek photographic studios. After establishing his studio opposite the Shepheard's Hotel in Cairo's European district, Lekegian positioned himself as an 'artistic' photographer, distinguishing himself and his work as aesthetically superior to his mainly Armenian, French or Greek competitors, such as Jean Pascal Sébah or the Zangaki brothers.

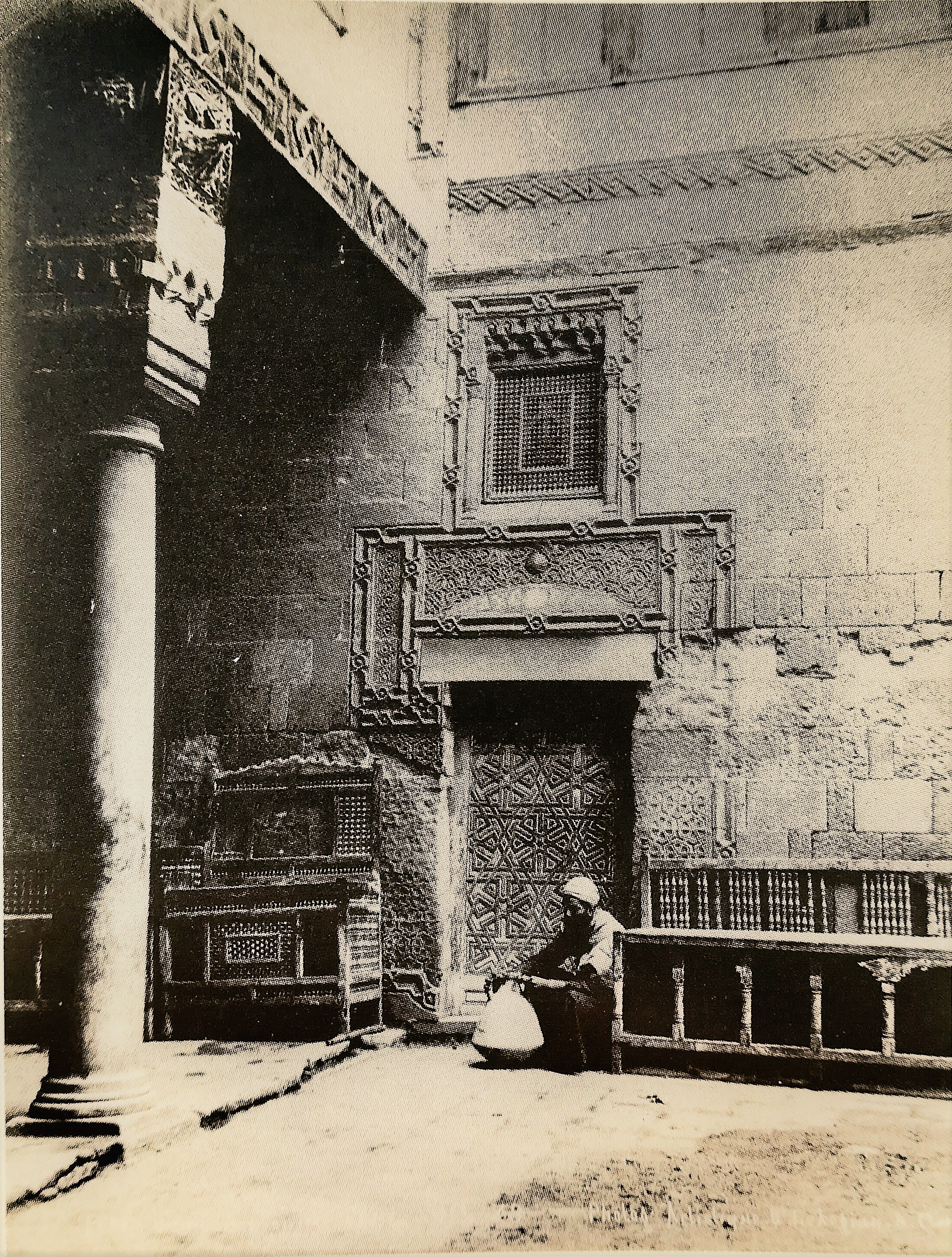
Courtyard in Cairo

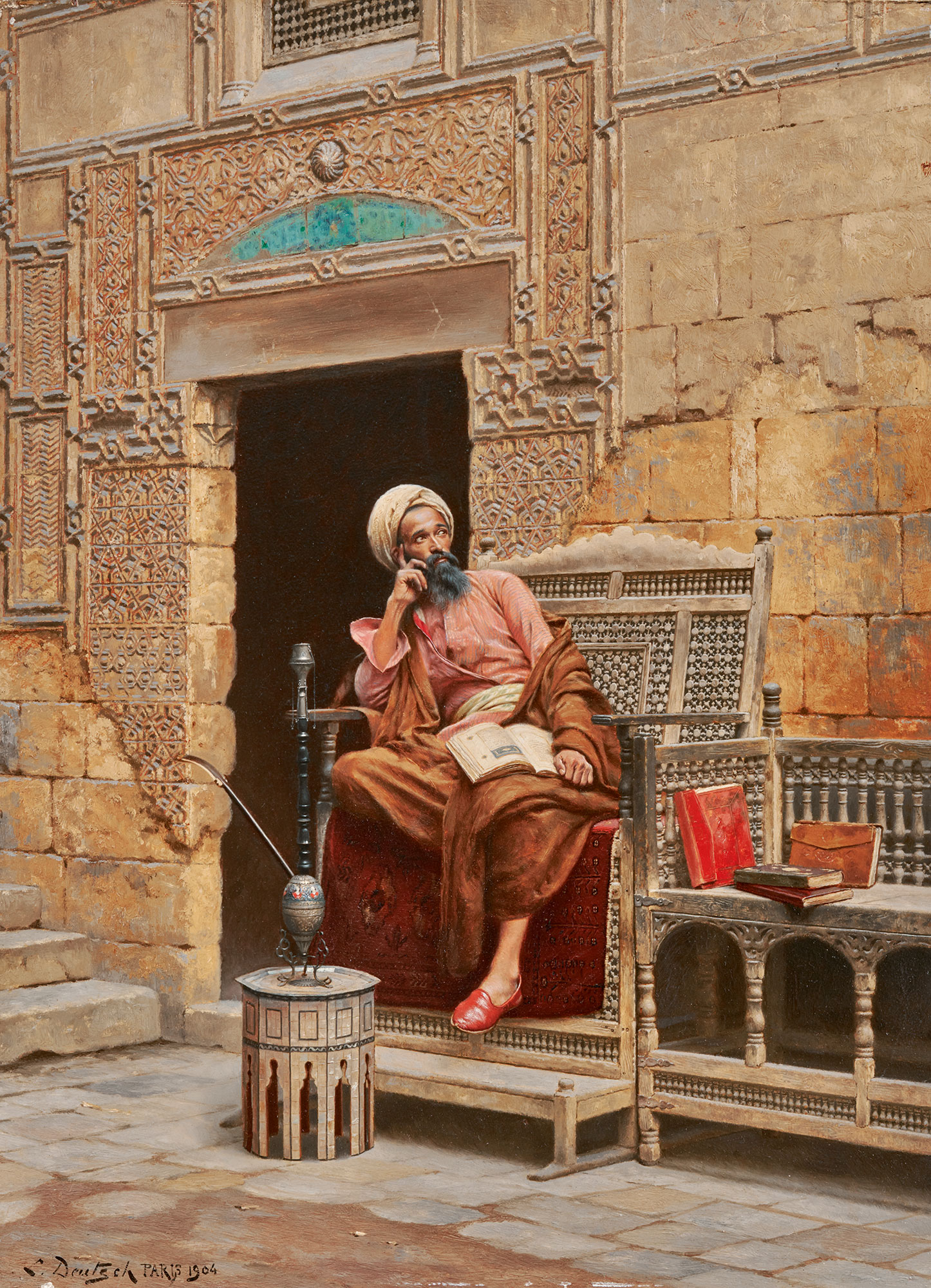
Ludwig Deutsch - The Scribe, 1904

A successful businessman, Lekegian produced numerous exotic images of the Orient that played up to the imagination of his predominantly European and American customers. Further, his photographs provided artistic documentation for Orientalist painters such as Ludwig Deutsch, who created his paintings in his studio in Paris. As Chief Curator of Photography at the Israel Museum, Nissan N. Perez, wrote, "the details in masonry and the angle of view in Deutsch's paintings El Azhar - The Arab University in Cairo and The Scribe are doubtlessly comparable to Lekegian's photographs of the same places.

Lekegian became a favoured photographer for the Egyptian royalty, several of whom, such as Princess Nazli, had their portraits taken by him. After he became the official photographer of the Anglo-Egyptian army in 1883/84, Lekegian's business prospered even more. He received commissions to illustrate books and to provide images of government building operations in the region. These images have been seen as Lekegian’s least known, but important works as early forms of documentary photography.

Apart from views for the growing number of tourists, such as the Pyramids, temples in Luxor and scenes of the Nile, Lekegian also created images of historical buildings in Egypt, as well as scenes drawn from the daily life of soldiers, bedouins and other Egyptians, including photographs of people from Sudan. According to the Armenian Photography Foundation,

His photographs of peasants, craftsmen and the poor are not mere theatrical fantasies about a country frozen in past. Instead they show the complex, multifaceted and rapidly changing environment, which Egypt was at the time. He is a rare practitioner of the time who believed that his medium was on par with any other art form and constantly experimented with and developed its aesthetic qualities.

— Armenian Photography Foundation, Gabriel Lekegian

In his book New Egypt (1905), to which Lekegian had contributed photographs of buildings, native people and an equestrian statue of Mohamed Ali, American travel writer Amedée Baillot de Guerville (1869–1913) wrote: "There are very few good photographers in Egypt, and I should advise those amateurs who do not develop their own work to be very careful. I have had many plates and films absolutely ruined by ignoramuses calling themselves “prize photographers.” To those in Cairo I can thoroughly recommend either M. Lekégian or M. Dittrich, photographer to the Court." As Lekegian produced dry-plate images from 10'' x 8'' large formats up to ultra large 20'' x 16'' formats, New Egypt further wrote that he "has, besides some remarkable portraits, a unique collection of views both in large prints and in postcards."

Along with images by other 19th-century photographers, such as Felice Beato, Jean Pascal Sebah or the Zangaki Brothers, his images were often published in albums showing touristic sites in Egypt. In the early 1920s, Lekegian's studio produced mainly portraits and postcard compilations from his old negatives, and he is considered to have closed down his business, retiring soon after.

== Recognition ==
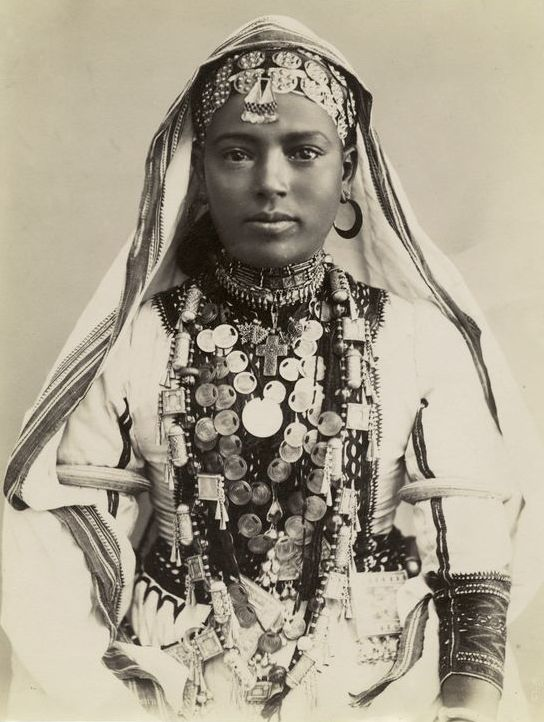
Young woman with elaborate jewellery, including a cross and traditional dress, before 1920

A collection of his photographs of ancient Egyptian sites near Cairo and Luxor, as well as images of local people and events was published around 1880 under the title Photographs of Egypt showing Cairo, Luxor, and the Nile Banks). Further, a library box with 58 unbound albumen prints measuring 22 x 28 cm on light blue mounts, most of them titled in French, numbered and signed "Photogr. Artistique G. Lekegian", is held in the New York Public Library. Similar albumen prints, mainly by Lekegian, were included in two albums with photographs of ancient and late 19th-century Egypt in 1910 by a German group of Orient travellers. These were edited in the 2011 book Ägypten: Eine Reise durch drei Zeiten; Bildband der frühen Orientfotografie. (Egypt: A journey through three times; Picture book of early Orient photography)

At the 1889 International Exhibition in Paris, Lekegian won a medal for 'Professional Artistic Photography', and at the World’s Columbian exposition in Chicago in 1893, he was awarded the grand prize.

In 2010, the Municipal Medieval Museum of Bologna, Italy, presented an exhibition titled Memoires d'Egypte with an accompanying catalogue of historical photographs of the Near East by Felice Beato, Félix Bonfils, Andreas Reiser and Lekegian.

Lekegian's photographs are part of the permanent collection of the Victoria and Albert Museum, and the Wellcome Collection, London, the Swedish Hallwyl Museum, Leiden University Library in the Netherlands, Rice University's TIMEA - Travelers in the Middle East Archive and of the Digital Collections of the New York Public Library.

== Gallery ==
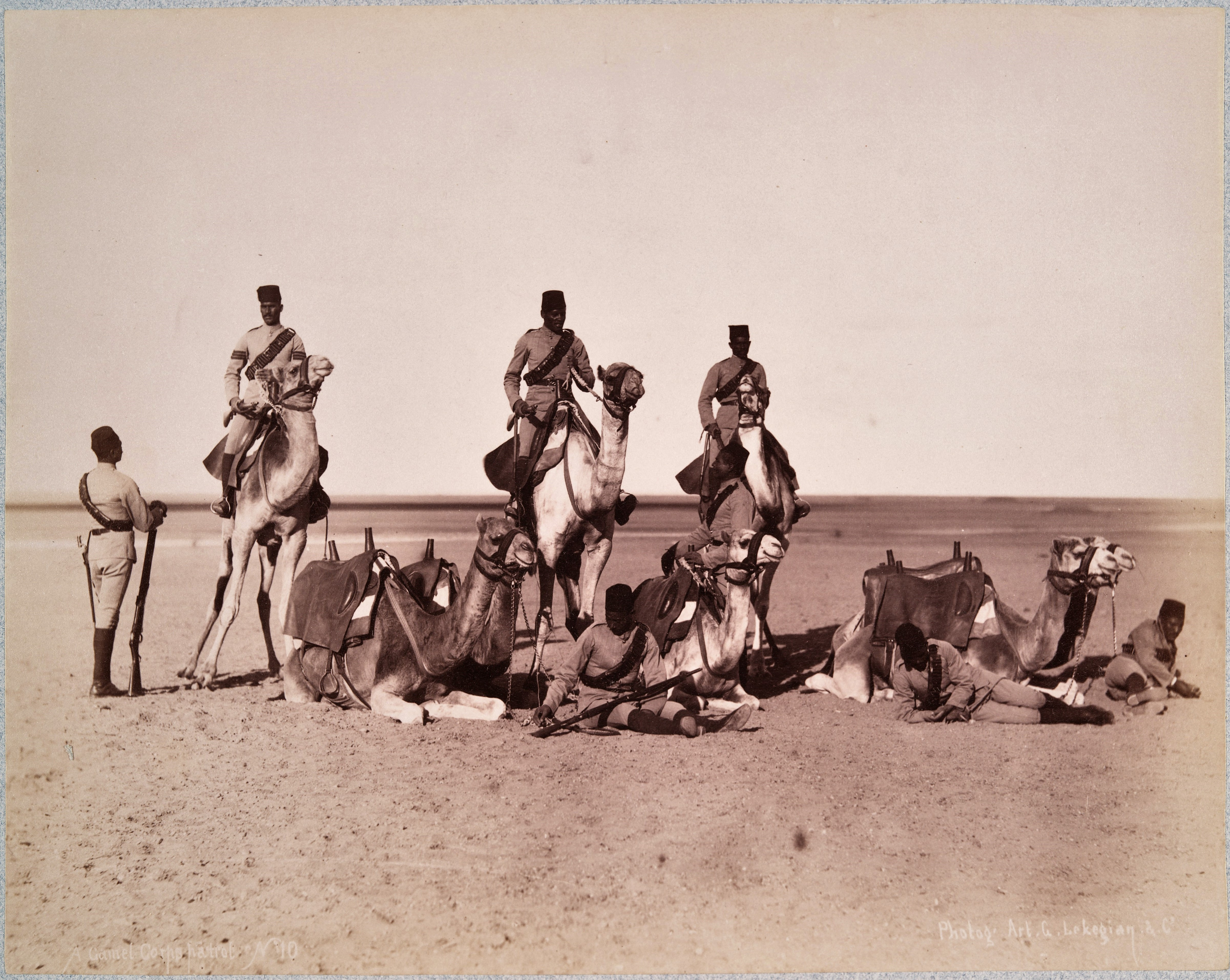
Camel corps of the Anglo-Egyptian army

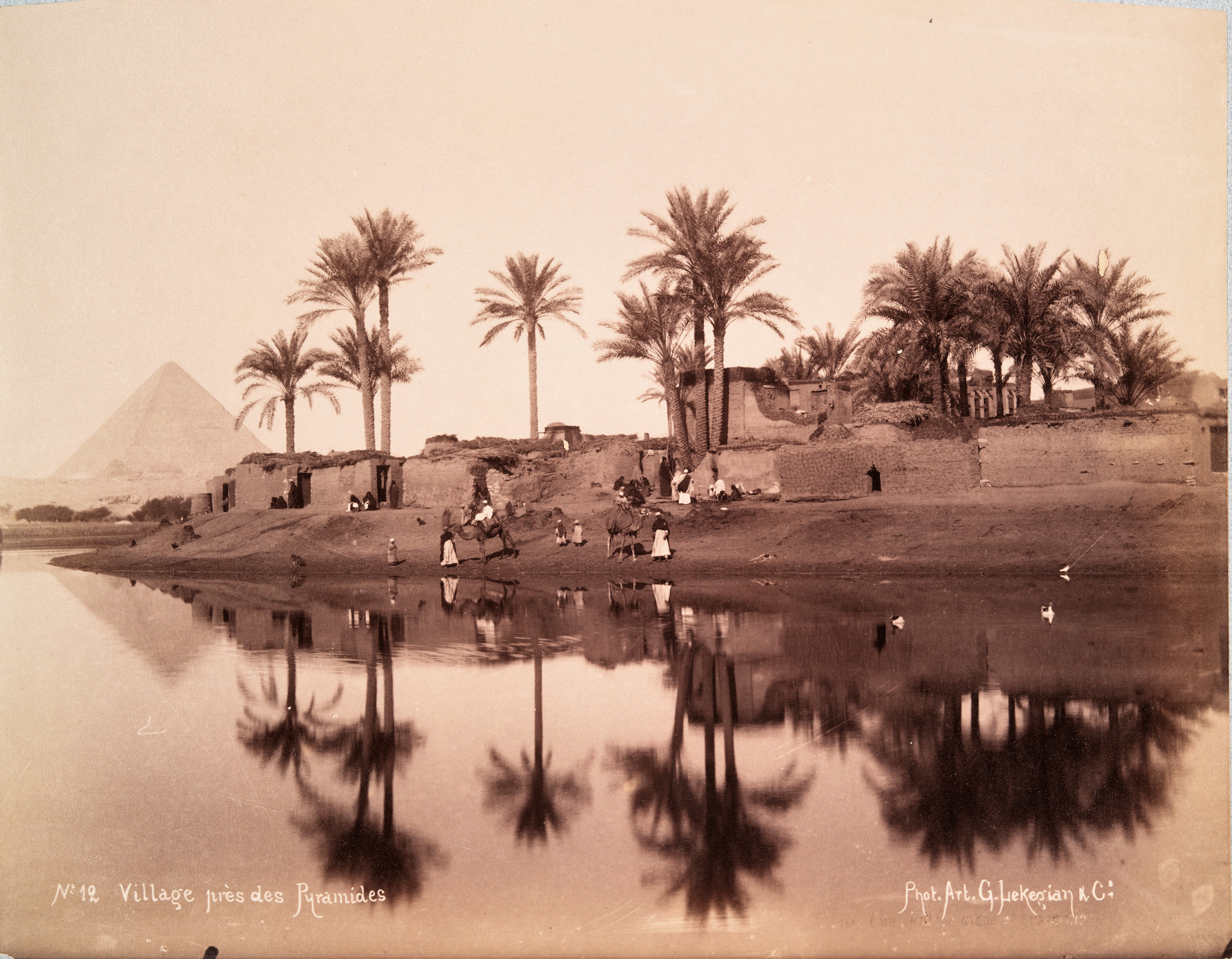
Village by the Nile near Gizeh

Group of belly dancers

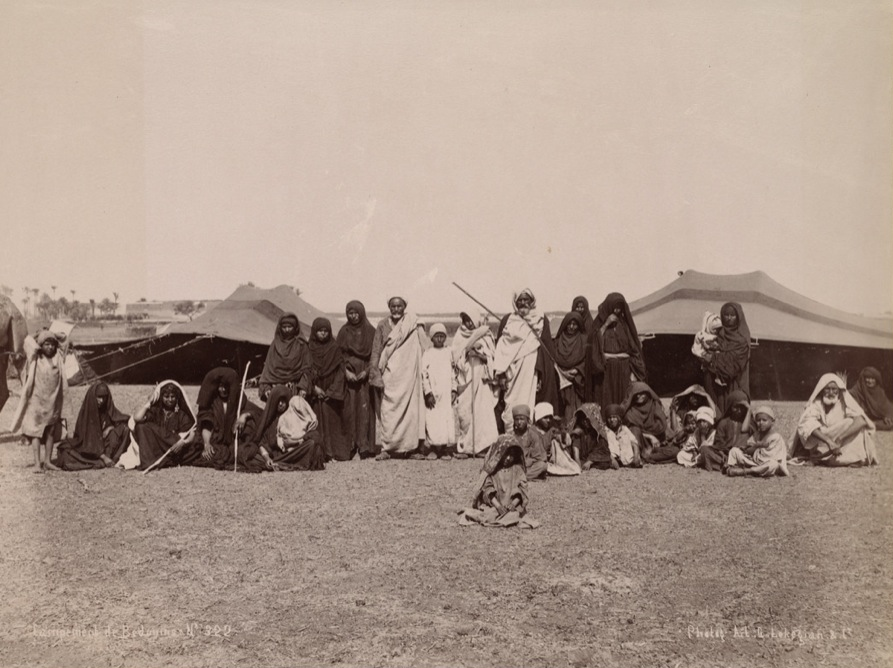
Bedouin encampment

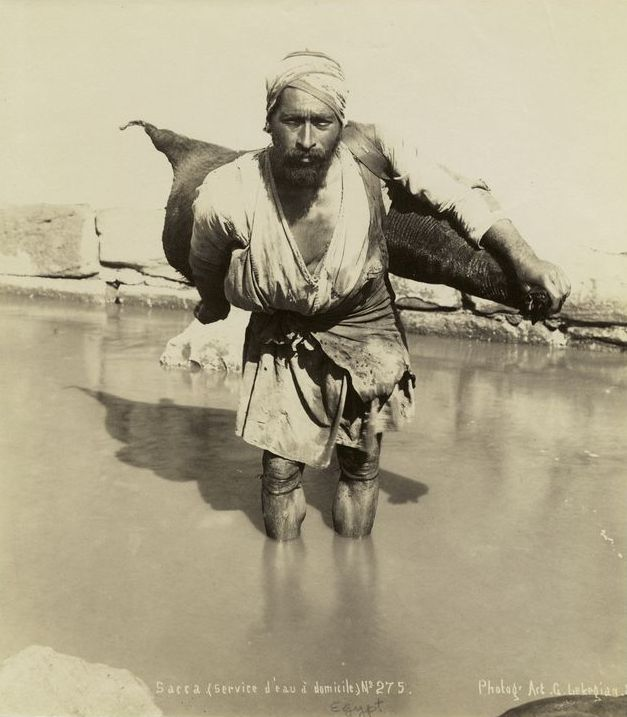
Water seller

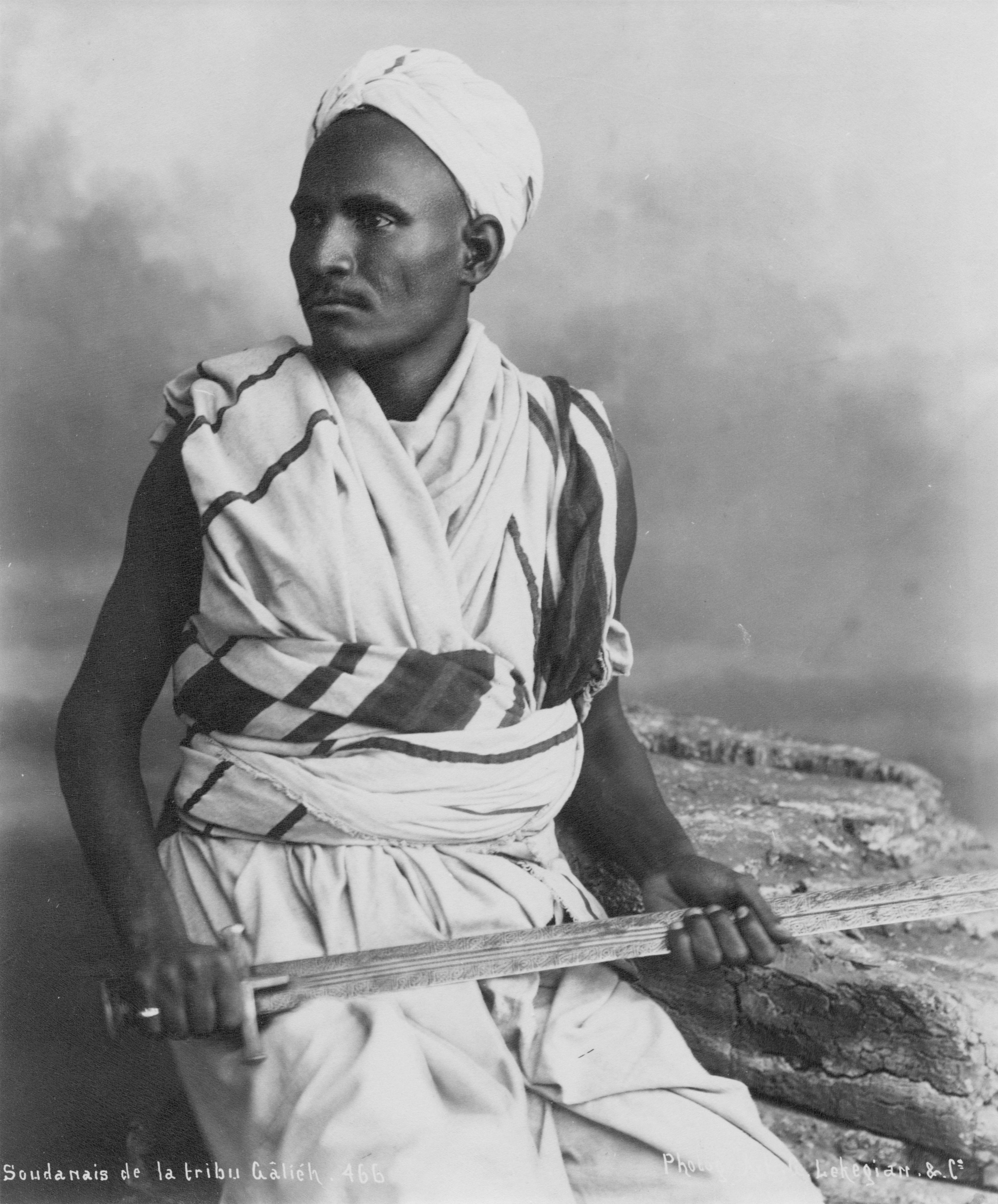
Sudanese man of the Shaigiya tribe

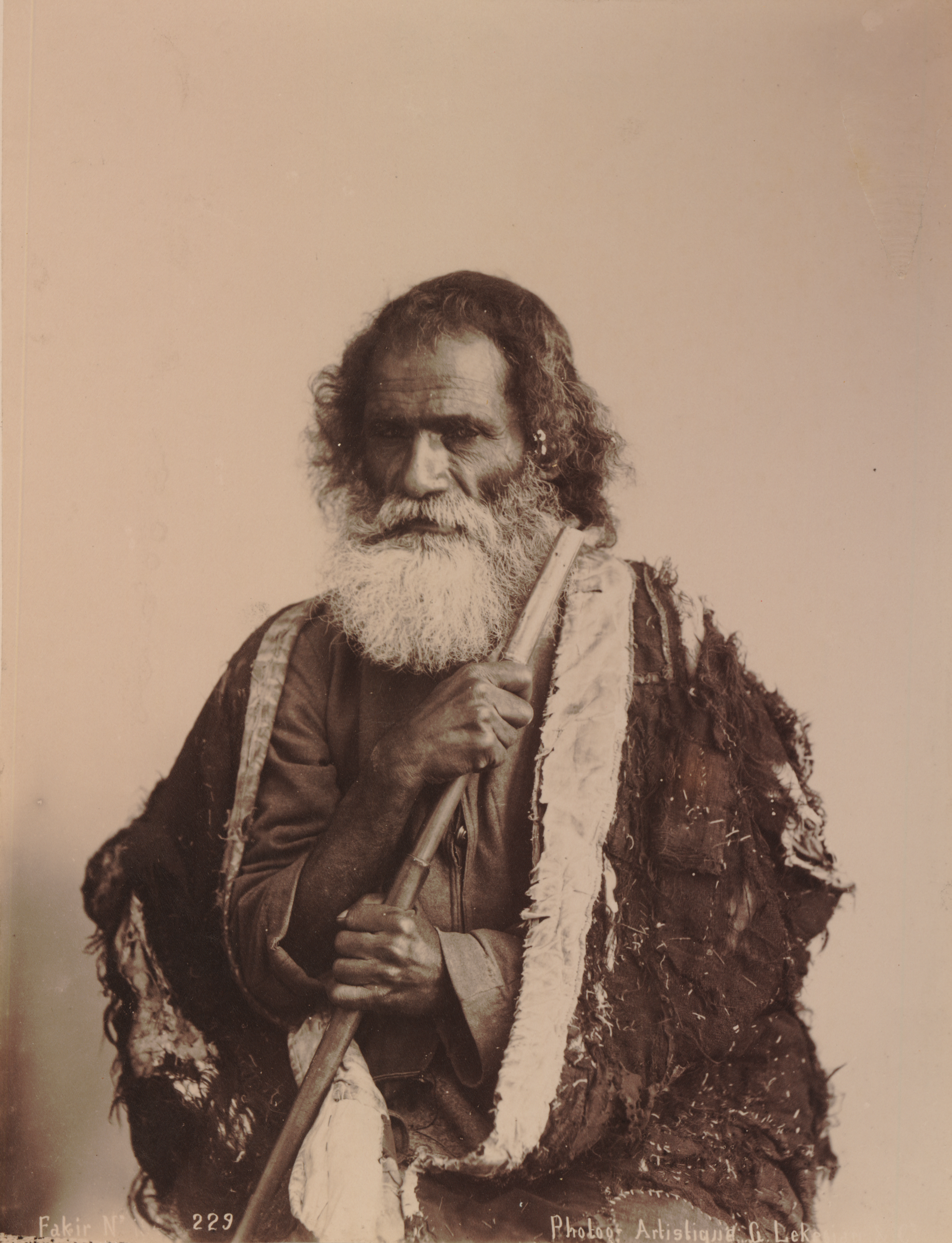
Beggar

Woman from Upper Egypt

== See also ==
Other 19th-century photographers in Ottoman Egypt:

- Francis Frith
- Pascal Sébagh
- Jean Pascal Sébah
- Zangaki Brothers
- Hippolyte Arnoux

== Bibliography ==
- Vaczek, Louis (1981). Travelers in ancient lands: a portrait of the Middle East, 1839–1919. Boston: New York Graphic Society. ISBN 0-8212-1130-7. OCLC 7577393.
- Perez, Nissan N. (1988) Focus East: Early Photography in the Near East 1839-1885. New York: Harry N. Abrams, Inc., p.190
- Peeters, Agnes (1994). Palmen en tempels : fotografie in Egypte in de XIXe eeuw = la photographie en Egypte au XIXe siècle = 19th-century photography in Egypt (in Dutch, English, and French). Leuven Paris: Peeters Peeters-France. ISBN 2-87723-147-X. OCLC 906661405.
- Jacobson, Ken (2007). Odalisques & Arabesques: Orientalist Photography 1839–1925. London: Quaritch. ISBN 9780955085253, OCLC 883254420. p. 249–250
- Hannavy, John (2008). Encyclopedia of nineteenth-century photography. New York, NY: Routledge. ISBN 978-0-415-97235-2. OCLC 123968757. p. 840
- Golia, Maria (2010). Photography and Egypt. London: Reaktion. ISBN 978-1-86189-543-1. OCLC 318873198.
- Ferri, Antonio (2010). Memoires d'Egypte: da un album fotografico del 1895 : fotografie di Beato, Bonfils, Lekegian, Reiser (in Italian). Bologna: Bononia University Press. ISBN 978-88-7395-552-8. OCLC 710817016.
- Petit, A. (2011). Ägypten. Eine Reise durch drei Zeiten; Bildband der frühen Orientfotografie (in German). BoD – Books on Demand. pp. 22–36. ISBN 978-3-8423-6091-4.
- Gordon, Robert; Kurzwelly, Jonatan (2018). "Photographs as Sources in African History". Oxford Research Encyclopedia of African History. London: Oxford University Press. doi:10.1093/acrefore/9780190277734.013.250. ISBN 978-0-19-027773-4.
