= Totzke =

Totzke is a German cognominal surname. It derives from a heavily altered Slavic-influenced pet form of the personal name Dietrich. Notable people with the surname include:

- Albert Frederick Totzke (1882–1951), Canadian politician and pharmacist
- Ilse Totzke (1913–1987), German musician
