= Dittrich =

Dittrich is a variant of the German name Dietrich. It occurs as a surname of ethnic Germans in Silesia. Notable people with the surname include:

- Barbara Dittrich (born 1964), American politician
- Boris Dittrich (born 1955), Dutch politician and human rights activist
- Denise Dittrich (born 1957), American Democratic politician
- Franz Dittrich, Austrian pathologist
- Klaus Dittrich, German computer scientist
- Olli Dittrich, German actor and comedian
- P. Dittrich (fl. 1880–1918), German photographer in Egypt
- Paul-Heinz Dittrich (1930–2020), German composer and academic teacher
- Rudolph Dittrich, German entomologist
- Raik Dittrich, East German biathlete
- Stefan Dittrich (1912–1988), German politician
- Thomas Dittrich (born 1954), German hurdler
- Werner Dittrich (born 1937), German weightlifter
- Wolfgang Dittrich, triathlete
