= Detrick =

Detrick may refer to:

== People ==
- Bill Detrick (1927–2014), American college basketball and golf coach
- Detrick DeBurr (born 1969), entrepreneur, author, and computer/website specialist
- Detrick Hughes (born 1966), American poet and spoken-word artist
- Frederick Detrick (1889–1931), physician, flight surgeon and pilot

== Places ==
- Detrick, Virginia
- Detrick Peak, Antarctica
- Fort Detrick, Maryland

== See also ==
- Deatrick, surname
- Dietrich (disambiguation)
