= William Dietrich =

William Dietrich may refer to:

- William E. Dietrich (born 1950), American geologist
- William S. Dietrich II (1938–2011), American steel industry executive and philanthropist
- William Dietrich (novelist) (born 1951), American novelist
- Bill Dietrich (1910–1978), American Major League Baseball pitcher

== See also ==
- Dietrich (disambiguation)
