= Rudolf Carl von Slatin =

Anglo-Austrian officer, administrator and politician (1857–1932)

Major-General Rudolf Carl Freiherr von Slatin GCVO KCMG CB
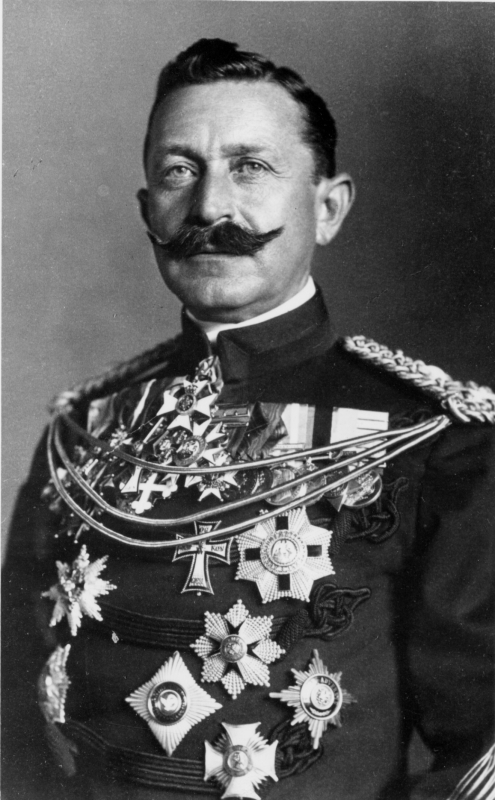
- Slatin in 1910

Governor-General of Darfur
- In office 1881 – 26 January 1885

Personal details
- Born: 7 June 1857 Ober Sankt Veit, Vienna, Austrian Empire
- Died: 4 October 1932 (aged 75) Vienna, Austria

Military service
- Allegiance: Austria-Hungary
- Branch/service: Austro-Hungarian Army

Major-General Rudolf Anton Carl Freiherr von Slatin, (7 June 1857, in Ober Sankt Veit, Hietzing, Vienna – 4 October 1932, in Vienna) was an Anglo-Austrian soldier and administrator in Sudan.

== Early life ==
Rudolf Carl Slatin was born in Ober Sankt Veit near Vienna, the fourth child of the merchant Michael Slatin, who had converted from Judaism to Roman Catholicism, and his second wife, Maria Anna Feuerstein. Their other children were the twins Maria and Anna (born in 1852), Heinrich (1855), Adolf (1861), and Leopoldine (1864). Their father died on 13 March 1873, while Rudolf was at the Vienna Handelsakademie (commercial academy). While there, he heard that a German bookseller in Cairo was looking for an assistant. Rudolf travelled to Trieste and five days after that to Alexandria. He worked in the bookstore until he travelled with the German businessman and consul Rosset to Khartoum.

From Khartoum, Slatin went through Kordofan to Dar Nuba, exploring the mountains of that region with the German explorer and ornithologist Theodor von Heuglin. He was forced to return to Khartoum, when the local population rebelled against the Egyptian government. There, Slatin met Isaak Schnitzer, later famous as "Emin Pasha", and with him intended to visit General Charles George Gordon at Lado, Gordon at that time being Governor of the Equatorial Provinces. Slatin, however, was obliged to return to Austria without accomplishing his desire, though Emin did go to Lado and at Slatin's request recommended the young traveller to Gordon for employment in Sudan.
Slatin left Africa in order to serve his conscription order in the Austrian army. On 25 September 1876 he joined his unit the 12. Feldjägerbatallon as recruit, and one year later, he was promoted to lieutenant in the reserves of the 19th Infantry Regiment of the Austro-Hungarian Army.

In 1878, while Slatin was serving as a lieutenant in crown prince Rudolf's regiment in the Bosnian campaign. he received a letter from Gordon inviting him to Sudan, where Gordon had become the Governor-General. At the close of the campaign, Slatin received permission to go to Africa. He started his travel via train and ship on 1 December 1878 and arrived in Khartoum in January 1879. After a brief period as financial inspector, Slatin was appointed Mudir (governor) of Dara, the south-western part of Darfur, a post he held until early in 1881, when he was promoted Governor-General of Darfur by Muhammad Rauf Pasha and given the rank of bey.

== Surrender of Dara ==
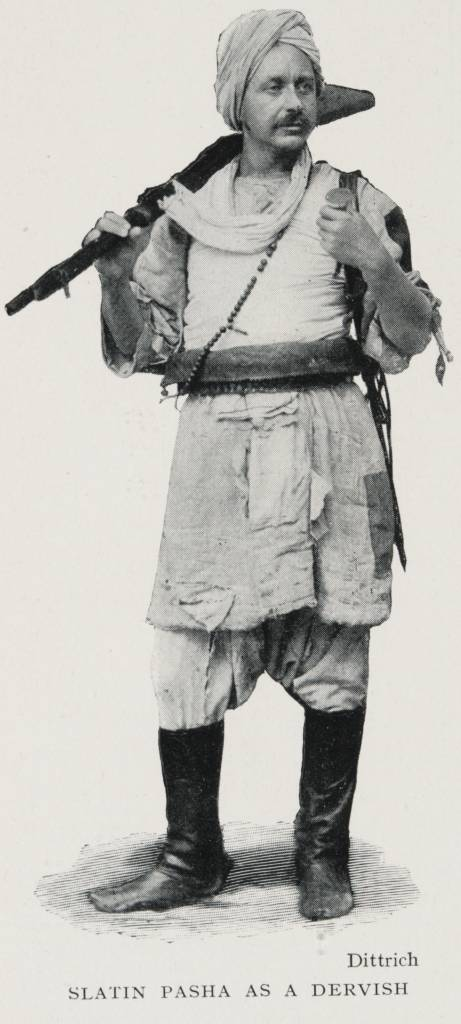
Slatin photographed in Mahdist clothing in 1906, by Paul Dittrich.

While administering Dara, Slatin conducted a successful campaign against one of the Darfur princes in revolt and later, as governor of Darfur. Early in 1882 the Rizeigat tribesmen of Southern Darfur rebelled, led by Sheikh Madibbo ibn Ali, a convert to the cause of the religious leader known as the Mahdi Muhammad Ahmad. Slatin gallantly defended his province and though he fought many successful battles, he gradually lost ground. At the Battle of Om Waragat he lost 800 of his men in the first 20 minutes of the battle and was himself wounded three times but managed to fight his way back to Dara. Believing his troops attributed their failure in battle to the fact that he was a Christian, Slatin publicly adopted Islam in 1883 and took the Islamic name Abd al Qadir.

The Mahdists then captured el Obeid, the capital of Kordofan, severing all Slatin's links with Khartoum. When Hicks Pasha's expedition was annihilated at the Battle of Shaykan in 1883, Slatin finally surrendered to his old enemy the Mahdist Emir Madibbo, refusing to make any further sacrifice of life in a hopeless cause. When the Mahdists reached Khartoum, an attempt was made to use him to induce the commander Charles George Gordon, now Governor-General of Sudan, to surrender. This failing, Slatin was placed in chains and on the morning of 26 January 1885, an hour or two after the fall of Khartoum, Gordon's head was brought to the camp and shown to the captive. After the sudden death of the Mahdi the same year, Slatin was kept at Omdurman by his successor, the Khalifa Abdullahi, being treated alternately with savage cruelty and comparative indulgence. During his captivity, he worked as adviser and interpreter for the Khalifa and was made to serve in his personal retinue of bodyguards.

== Escape from captivity ==
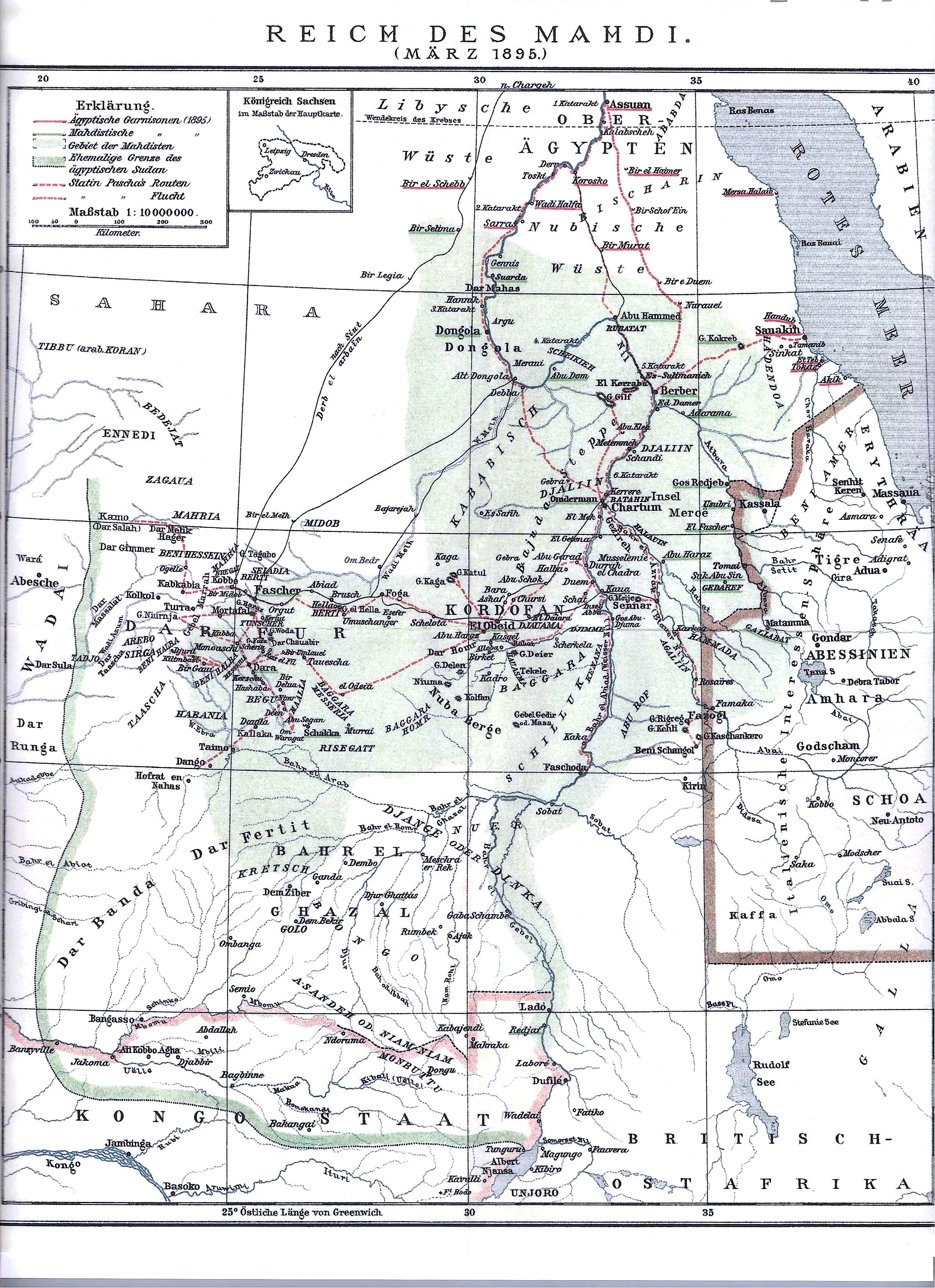
Slatin's travels in 19th cent. Sudan

At length, after over eleven years captivity, he was able to escape, with the help of Sir Reginald (then Major) Wingate of the Egyptian Intelligence Department and a local Sheikh of the Ababda tribe, in a perilous 1,000 km (620 mi) and three-week journey across the desert, reaching Aswan, Egypt in March 1895. In a remarkable book, Fire and Sword in the Sudan, written in the same year and issued in English and German in 1896, Slatin gave not only a personal narrative of fighting and serving the Mahdists but a comprehensive account of the Sudan under the rule of the Khalifa. The book, edited by F. R. Wingate, became a bestseller. The German version was published by the Brockhaus Verlag in Leipzig entitled "Feuer und Schwert im Sudan. Meine Kämpfe mit den Derwischen, meine Gefangenschaft und Flucht.1879–1895." His book became an important inspiration for the German author Karl May and his trilogy "Im Lande des Mahdi". He also published another book entitled "Elf Jahre in der Gefangenschaft des Mahdi".

Raised to the rank of Pasha by the Khedive, Slatin was appointed an honorary Companion of the Order of the Bath by Queen Victoria. In autumn 1895, he was granted an audience with Emperor Franz Joseph I of Austria. Queen Victoria made him an honorary Member (fourth class) of the Royal Victorian Order in 1896.

On the eve of his surrender to the Mahdi at Christmas 1883, he had resolved, if he regained his liberty, to use the knowledge he would acquire while in captivity for the eventual benefit of the country, and after a year's rest he took part, as an officer on the staff of the Egyptian army, in the campaigns of 1897–98 which ended in the capture of Omdurman.

== Further service ==
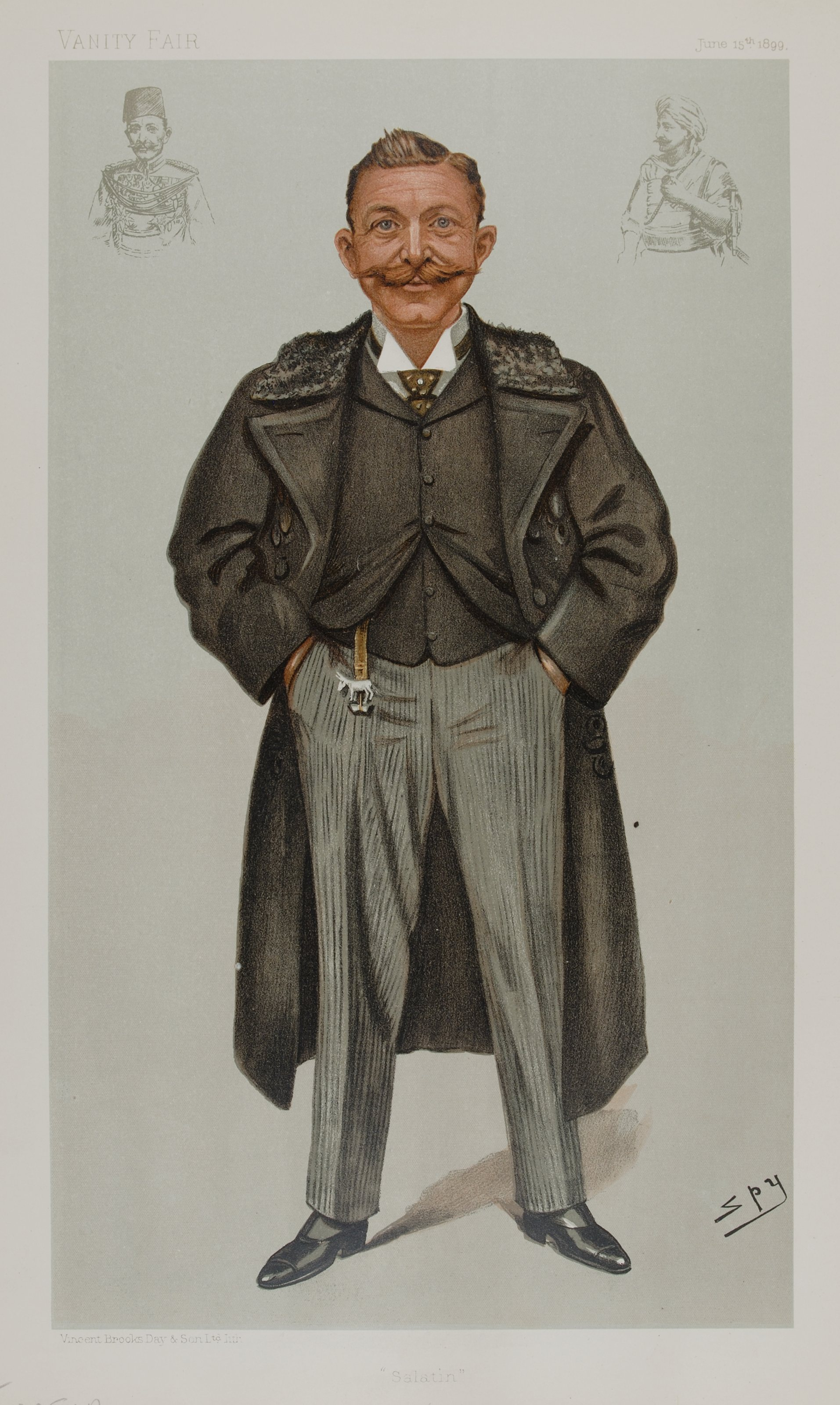
"Salatin" Slatin as caricatured by Spy (Leslie Ward) in Vanity Fair, June 1899

For his services in these campaigns, he was created an honorary Knight Commander of the Order of St Michael and St George by Queen Victoria in 1898 and in 1899 was knighted by Franz Joseph I of Austria. Also in 1899, he was made a brigadier-general in the British Army. In 1900 he was appointed inspector-general of the Sudan, in which capacity his mastery of Arabic and his profound knowledge of the land and peoples proved invaluable in the work of reconstruction undertaken by the Anglo-Egyptian government in that country. He was a close friend of the governor-general, F. R. Wingate, and was free to define his role as inspector-general without much interference from his colleagues and superiors. Never before or since did any official hold the title of inspector-general. He was a frequent guest of Queen Victoria.

In 1906, he was ennobled by Franz Joseph I of Austria. He was since styled "Freiherr von Slatin". In 1907, he was made an honorary major-general in the British army and in 1909 he was created an honorary Knight Commander of the Royal Victorian Order by King Edward VII of the United Kingdom. His rank in the Austro-Hungarian Army always remained Leutnant d.R.

His position as inspector-general of the Sudan terminated in 1914 due to the commencement of hostilities in World War I between Great Britain and Austria-Hungary.

He then headed the prisoners-of-war section of the Austrian Red Cross. He was awarded with the title Geheimrat by Franz Joseph I of Austria in December 1914.

He was involved in the plans of Charles I of Austria to get a separate peace with Great Britain and France.

=== Later life ===
He received absolution from the Pope for his conversion to Islam, which he had reversed.

During the years he served the British Empire, he became acquainted with Robert Baden-Powell and became his friend. So it was not surprising that he was asked to serve within the new founded Austrian Scout organisation. From 1914 to 1918, he was the Honorary Chief Scout of the Österreichischer Pfadfinderbund. In January 1929, a letter of Rudolf Carl von Slatin is published under the title Ehrenbundesfeldmeister (National Chief Scout) in the Austrian Scout Magazine "Unser Weg".

He was also an honorary member of the Royal Geographical Society.

In 1918, on behalf of the Austrian government led by Renner, he was instrumental, through his British contacts, in ensuring the supply of food and coal from Czechoslovakia for the beleaguered and starving inhabitants of Vienna. For this he was made an honorary citizen of Vienna in June 1932.

In 1919, he was a member of the Austrian delegation in St. Germain. and was responsible for the repatriation of Prisoners of War.

In 1919, a Scout group of the Österreichischer Pfadfinderbund in Klosterneuburg was named Slatin Pascha.

In November 1918, after the war, Slatin moved to Switzerland. In 1922 after the early death of his wife he moved to the South Tyrol and lived in a villa in Obermais a quarter of Meran. Every summer, with his daughter, he would visit his old Sudan comrades in England.

In November and December 1926, he visited the Sudan once again.

In June 1932, he and his daughter Anne Marie were guests of George V.

== Personal life ==
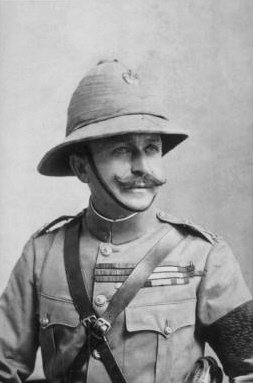
Rudolf Carl von Slatin in the early 1900s

On 21 June 1914, Rudolf Carl von Slatin married Baroness Alice von Ramberg. The wedding took place in the Votivkirche in Vienna. Together, they were the parents of:

- Baroness Anne Marie von Slatin (1916–2007), who married Prince George Vladimirovitch Galitzine (1916–1992), son of Prince Vladimir Galitzine, in London in 1943.

He died on 4 October 1932, during an operation for cancer in Vienna and was buried on 6 October in the cemetery of Ober St. Veit, a suburb of Vienna. The Austrian government lauded him as a historical statesman and ordered a state funeral. His headstone lists his name as "Rudolf Statin Pascha".

== Memory and legacy ==
In 1936, a drinking fountain was erected in Khartoum in his memory, but the bronze portrait plaque and dedication were removed in 1956 by the Sudanese government, after Sudan became independent. A Commemorative plaque is placed on his former house in Khartoum.

The Spitzvilla in Upper Austria near Traunkirchen is a memorial site for Rudolf Carl von Slatin. He bought it in 1897 and there entertained many grand persons of his epoch.

In 1967 the public-service German television channel ZDF produced a movie in two parts about Rudolf Carl von Slatin. It was titled Slatin Pascha. A documentary film about Slatin Pascha, Sudanese history and Sudan today was produced by Thomas Macho for the Austrian company Fischer Film in 2011. The film, entitled Slatin Pasha: On Her Majesty's Service (German: Slatin Pascha – Im Namen Ihrer Majestät) started in the Austrian Cinemas on 1 June 2012.

At the Austrian National Jamboree in 1961 a Subcamp was named Slatin Pascha.

An Old Scouts Guild, affiliated with the Pfadfinder-Gilde Österreichs is named Slatin Pascha. An Old Scout Group, belonging to the Österreichischer Pfadfinderbund in Vienna is named Slatin Pascha. A Scout Group in Vienna, belonging the National Scout Organisation Pfadfinder Österreichs, was also named Slatin Pascha.

In October 2011 a stamp was issued commemorating Slatin Pascha, Emmerich Teuber and the Viennese Scoutleader Kara Barteis.

His captivity and escape inspired the comics creators Mino Milani and Sergio Toppi for a comic story with the title "L'Uomo del Nilo" (The man of the Nile) in a series with the title "Un uomo un'avventura" (A man, an adventure) by Sergio Bonelli Editore
