= Dieleman =

Dieleman or Dielemans is a patronymic surname of Dutch and Flemish origin, derived from a pet form of Diedrick. Notable people with the surname include:

- Bill Dieleman (born 1931), American politician
- Frans Dieleman (1942–2005), Dutch geographer and professor
- Martijn Dieleman (born 1979), Dutch volleyball player
- Mitch Dielemans (born 1993), Dutch archer
- Paul Dielemans (born 1957), Dutch sailor
