= The Illustrated American =

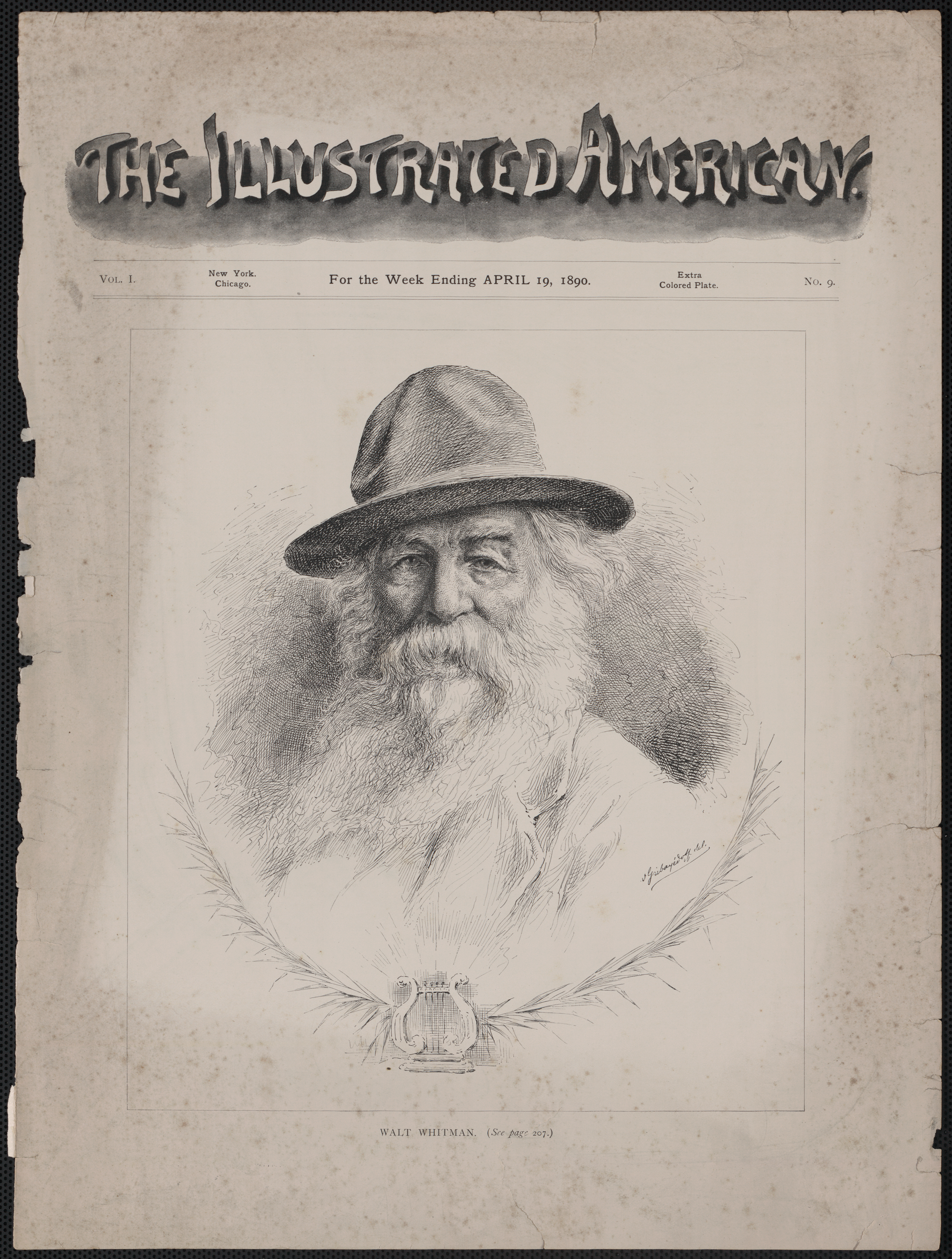
- Walt Whitman on cover of the April 19, 1890 issue
- Editor: Maurice M. Minton (1890–94); C.F. Nirdlinger (1894–96); Francis Bellamy (1897–98); Roland Burke Hennessey (1898–1900)
- Frequency: Weekly
- Publisher: Lorillard Spencer (1890–97)
- Total circulation: 40,000 (1892)
- Founded: February 22, 1890
- Final issue: 1900?
- Country: United States
- Based in: New York City
- Language: English

The Illustrated American was a weekly American periodical published from 1890 until 1900. It primarily covered current events (with illustrations), but also contained other miscellaneous content and some fiction.

The publication has been described as the first photographic weekly news magazine in the United States. It was first published on February 22, 1890, out of offices located in New York City, selling for 25 cents an issue, or 10 dollars per year. The price dropped to a more competitive 10 cents per issue after 1892.

Publisher Lorillard Spencer fronted the money for the new publication, and was its owner until 1897, when it was sold to a group led by Amédée Baillot de Guerville, who in turn sold the publication to Patterson and Roland Burke Hennessey. The publication's circulation reached 40,000 by 1892, but declined after Spencer sold it, and it last appeared in 1900.

Francis Bellamy, author of the American Pledge of Allegiance, was among its editors.
