= Dietrick =

Dietrick (pronounced "dee-trik") is both a given name and a surname. Notable people with the name include:

== Given name ==
- Dietrick Lamade (1859–1938), American publisher and founder of the newspaper Grit

== Surname ==
- Blake Dietrick (born 1993), American basketball player
- Coby Dietrick (born 1948), American basketball player
- Ellen Battelle Dietrick (1847–1895), American author and suffragist

== See also ==
- Dietrick Hall (building)
- Dietrich
