= Dieterich =

Dieterich (German pronunciation: [ˈdiːtəʁɪç]) is both a surname and a masculine German given name, a variant of Dietrich, itself the High German form of Theodoric. Notable people with the name include:

Surname:

- Albrecht Dieterich (1866–1908), German classical philologist and religious scholar
- Chris Dieterich (born 1958), American football player
- Heinz Dieterich (born 1943), German sociologist
- Helwig Dieterich (1601–1655), German physician
- Johann Christian Dieterich (1722–1800), German publisher
- Neil Dieterich (born 1943), American lawyer and politician
- William H. Dieterich (1876–1940), American politician from Illinois
- William H. Dieterich (judge) (1897–1964), American lawyer and judge from Wisconsin

Given name:

- Dieterich Buxtehude, (1637/39–1707), German-Danish organist and composer
- Dieterich Spahn, German-born American artist

== See also ==
- Dieterich, Illinois, village in Effingham County, Illinois, United States
- Dietrich
- Dittrich
