= Diederichs =

Diederichs is a German surname. Notable people with the surname include:

- Eugen Diederichs (1867–1930), German publisher
- Georg Diederichs (1900–1983), German politician
- Klaus Diederichs, English banker
- Nico Diederichs (1903–1978), South African politician
- Otto von Diederichs (1843–1918), Imperial German Navy admiral

== See also ==
- Helene Voigt-Diederichs (1875–1961), German writer
- Diederich
