= Diedrick =

Diedrick is a given name and a surname. Notable people with the name include:

- Diedrick Brackens (born 1989), American artist and weaver
- Dahrran Diedrick (1979–2023), Canadian football player

== See also ==
- Wilf Diedricks (1945–2009), South African cricket umpire
- Diederik, given name
- Diedrich, given name and surname
- Dieleman, a derivative
