= Paul Dittrich =

Austrian photographer (1868-1939)

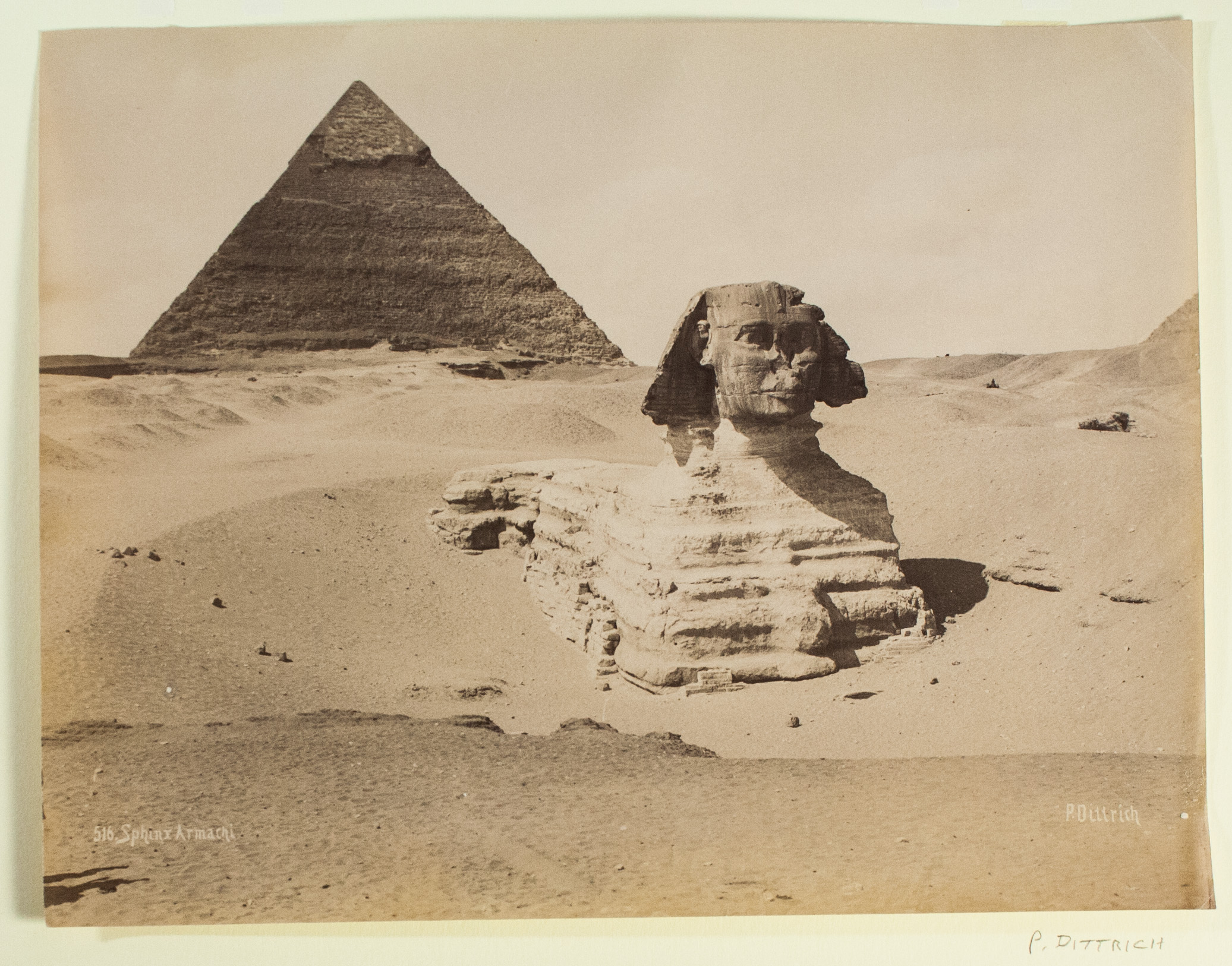
"Sphinx Armachi" albumen print from the portfolio of the studio P. Dittrich successor to I. Heyman, taken prior to 1886

Paul Dittrich (11 November 1868, Vienna, Austro-Hungarian Empire – 30 December 1939, Salzburg, Nazi Germany) was an Austrian photographer who established himself in Ottoman Egypt in 1894. He succeeded Ignaz Heyman at Heyman's studio in Cairo. Dittrich was one of the photographers to the Court of Egypt.

American journalist Amédée Baillot de Guerville refers to him in his book New Egypt (1905) by stating:

"To those in Cairo I can thoroughly recommend either M. Lekégian or M. Dittrich, photographer to the Court. The latter has a wonderful collection of portraits, admirably done, of all the more important persons. His rooms are a real museum of all the celebrities, masculine and feminine, whom Cairo has known in the last five-and-twenty years."

== Gallery ==
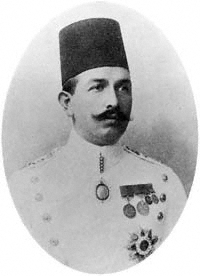
Khedive Abbas II of Egypt, c. 1900

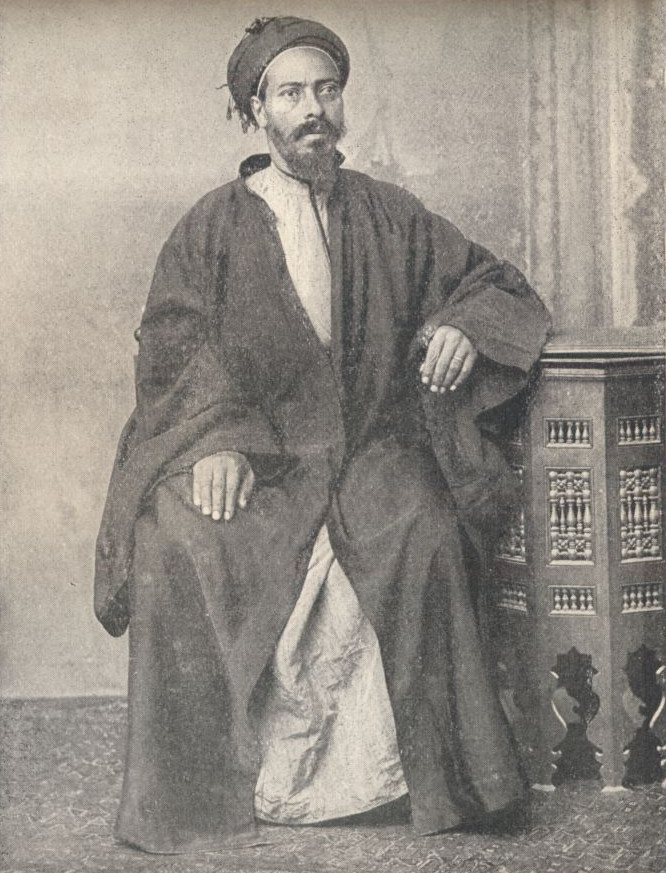
A Coptic Priest, 1918

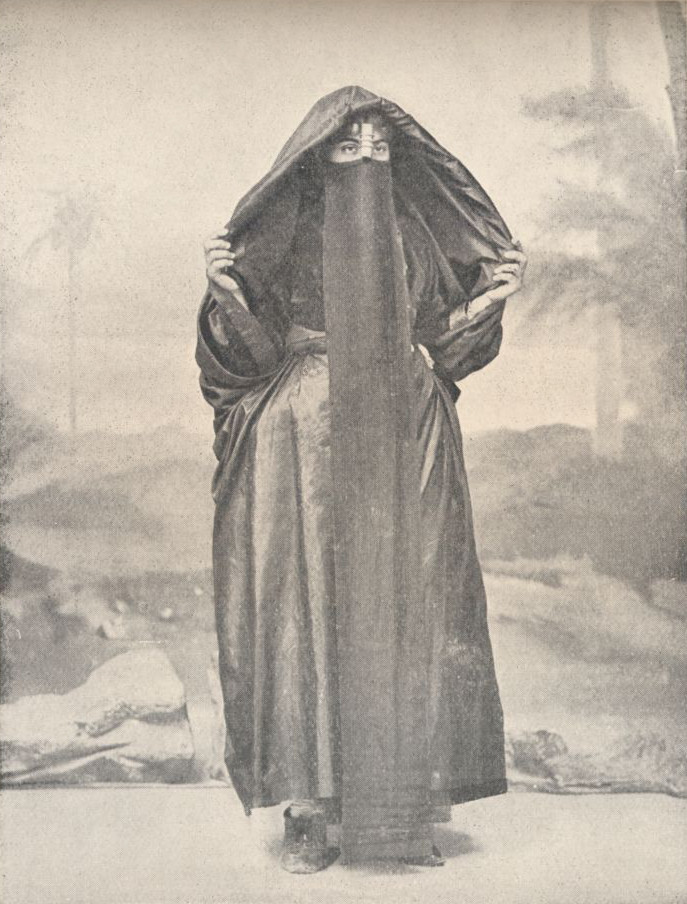
A Coptic woman of the Poorer Class, 1918

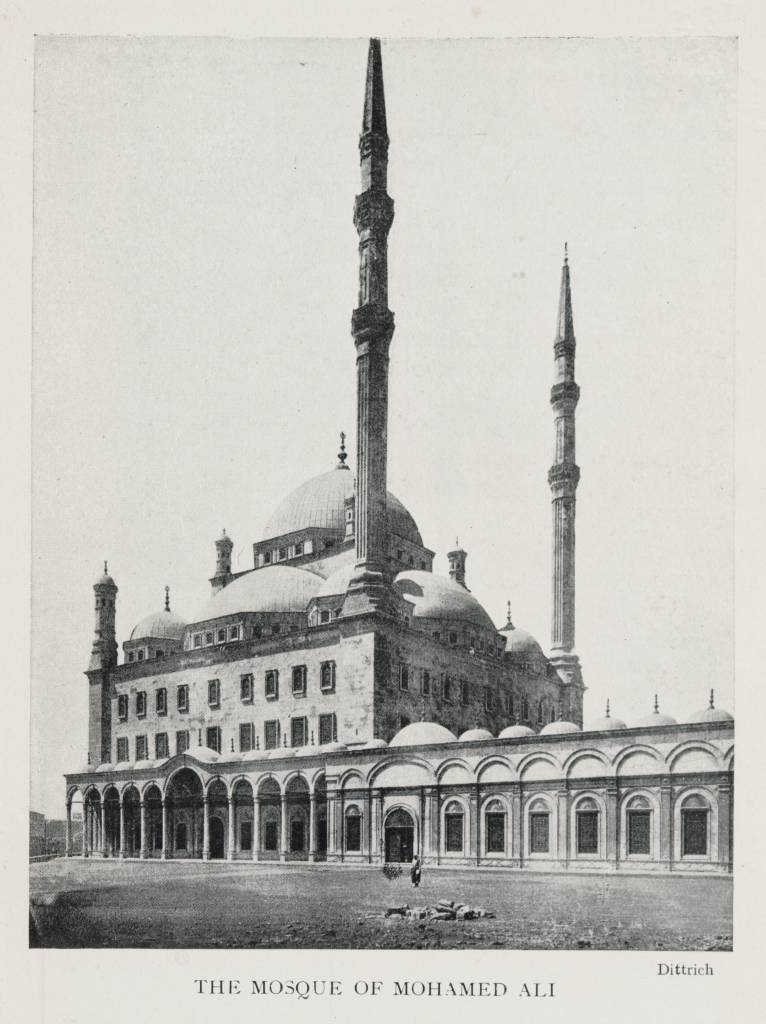
The Mosque of Mohamed Ali, 1906

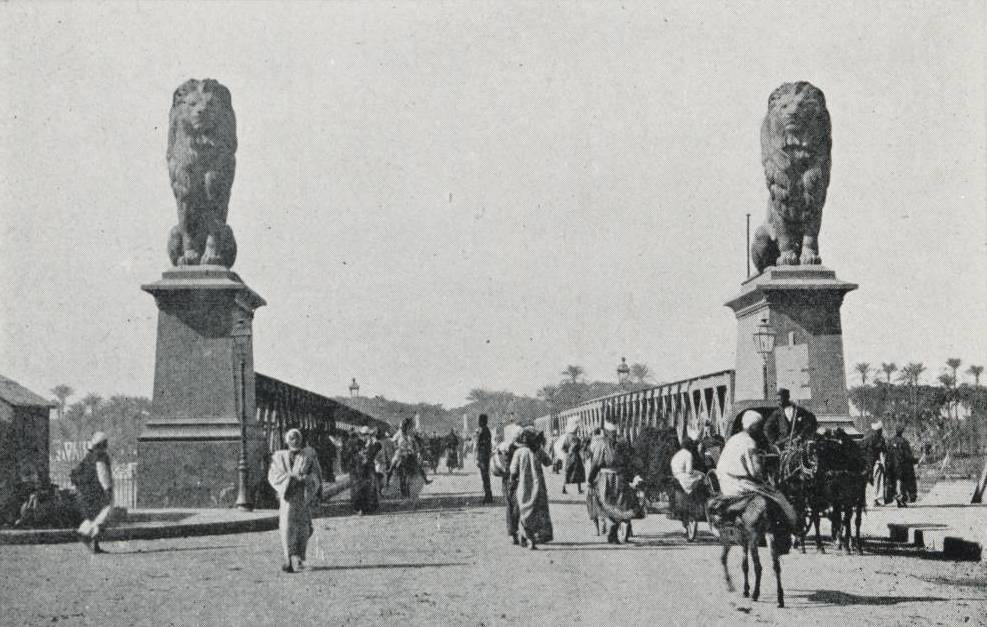
Ghezireh Bridge (1906)

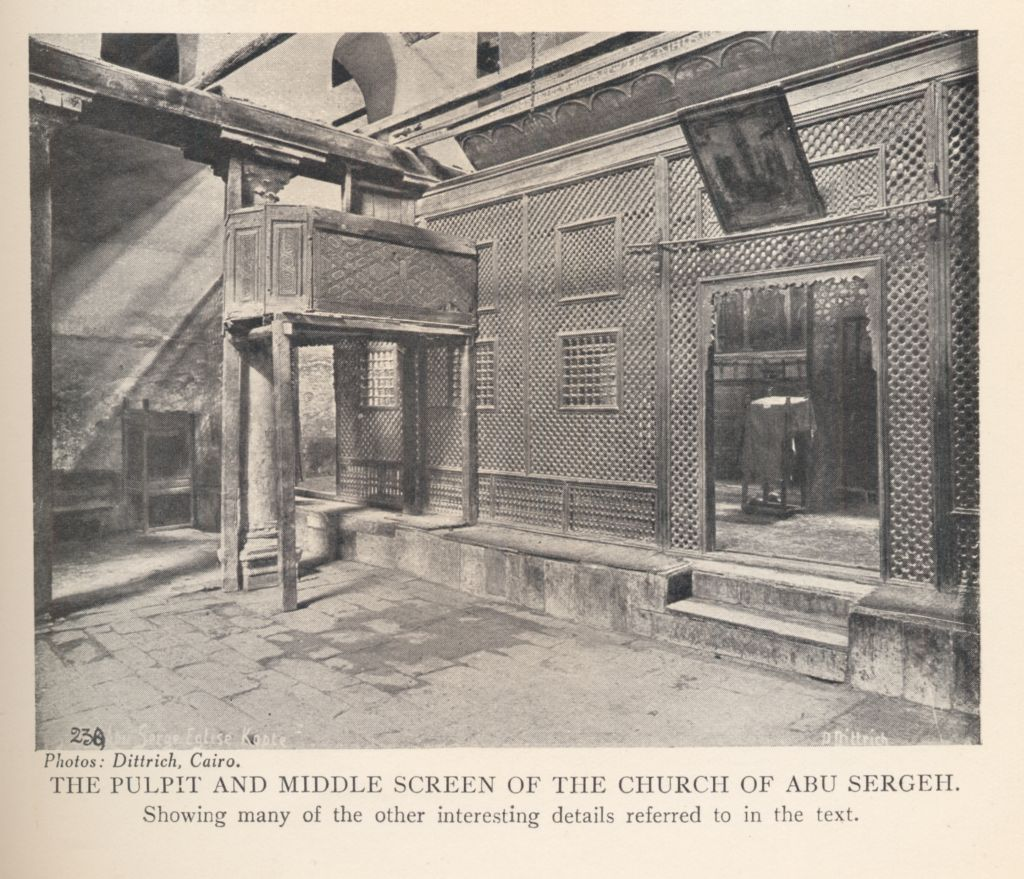
The Pulpit and Middle-Screen of the Church of Abu Sergeh. (1918)

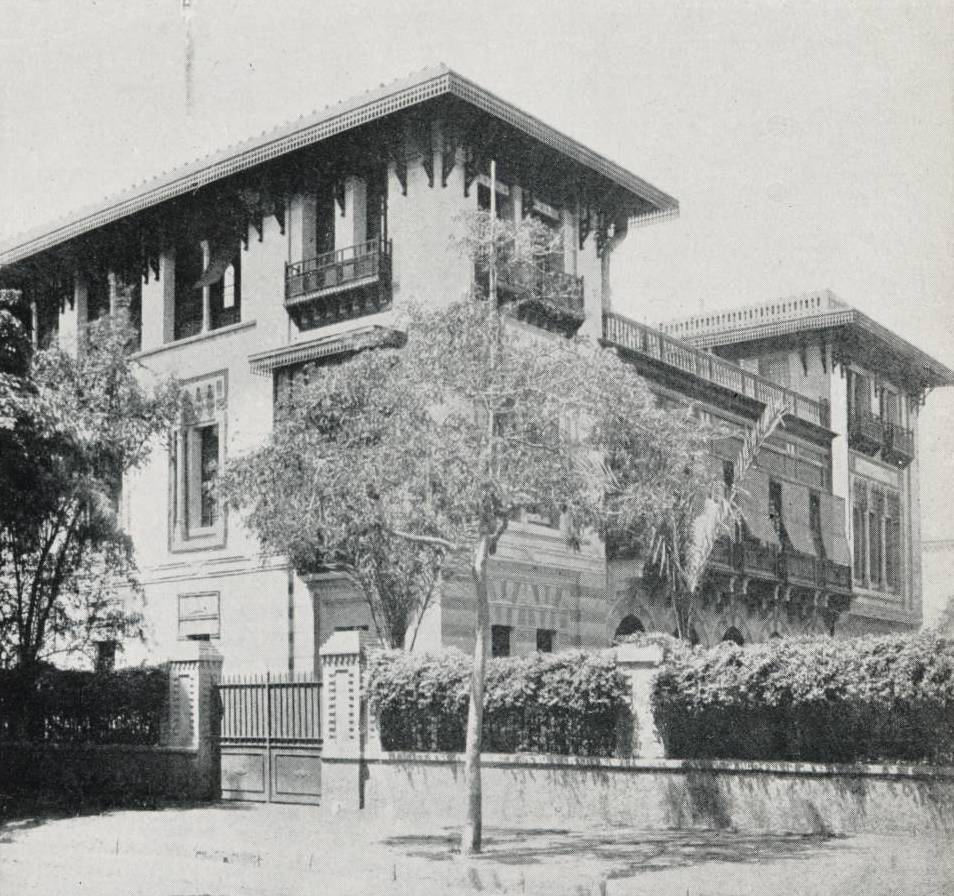
French Diplomatic Agency (1906)

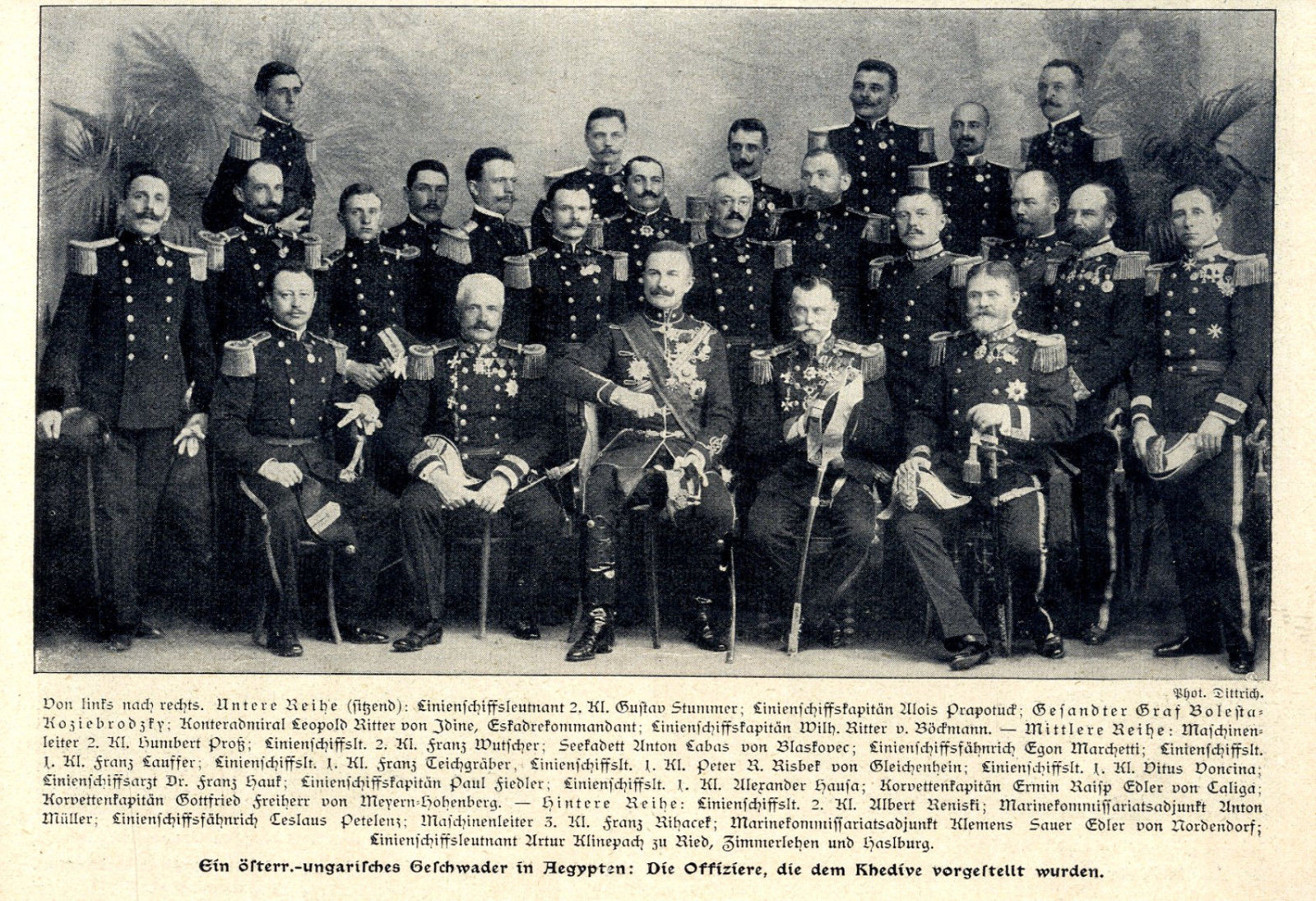
Officers of the Austro-Hungarian Navy on a visit to Egypt, 1906
