= Janet A. Deatrick =

American nursing professor

- Born: Ohio, USA
- Spouse: John P. Ash

Academic background
- Education: BSN, 1970, MSN, 1972, University of Cincinnati; PhD, 1982, University of Illinois Hospital & Health Sciences System
- Thesis: Meaning of hospitalization and surgery to chronically disabled adolescents and their parents (1982)

Academic work
- Institutions: University of Pennsylvania; Northwestern University

Janet Alma Deatrick is a Professor Emerita at the University of Pennsylvania's School of Nursing.

== Early life and education ==
Deatrick was born to parents Alma Gertrude (Tanis) Deatrick and John Deatrick in Ohio. She attended the University of Cincinnati College of Nursing for her undergraduate degree while serving as president of the Kappa Kappa Gamma sorority. As a PhD student, Deatrick led a series of studies which examined the experiences of families whose children were being cared at the hospital.

== Career ==
Upon receiving her PhD, Deatrick became an assistant professor and director of the graduate program at Northwestern University's Center for Nursing. She eventually left that position in 1989 to accept a temporary lecturer role at the University of Pennsylvania (UPenn). After one year in this position, Deatrick was promoted to assistant professor and later associate professor. In 1990, Deatrick and Kathleen Knafl co-published Family management style: Concept analysis and development, which revealed how families confronted challenges while staying in the hospital and the ways health care professional sometimes support or hinder their efforts. In recognition of her contributions, she received the Christian and Mary Lindback Award for Distinguished Teaching at the University of Pennsylvania in 1995 and the Excellence in Nursing Research Award for the Society of Pediatric Nurses in 1997.

By 1999, Deatrick was an associate professor, chair of the Division of Nursing of Children, graduate program director in the Pediatric Acute/Chronic Care Nurse Practitioner Program, and co-director of the International Center for Research on Women, Children and Families. As a result, she earned the University of Illinois Alumni Association's 1999 Achievement Award and chaired Penn's Disability Board. Deatrick took a sabbatical in 2001 to lead a study with the psychosocial oncology team at the Children's Hospital of Philadelphia (CHOP). Her research focused on cognitive-behavioral and family systems interventions for families with long-term survivors of childhood cancer. She continued to collaborate with CHOP even after returning to UPenn and in 2005 lead an interdisciplinary investigation to identify the characteristics of caregivers who feel most overwhelmed by the challenges facing them. With CHOP's assistance, she established the Family Management Styles Framework, which is aimed at guiding family research and has been translated into 10 languages. Two years later, she co-published The analysis and interpretation of cognitive interviews for instrument development with Knafl through the journal Research in Nursing & Health.

By 2013, Deatrick's work was recognized by various international organizations leading to the election as a Fellow of the American Academy of Nursing and serving as a member for its Child and Adolescent Expert Panel. On December 13, she was appointed the Shearer Endowed Term Chair in Healthy Community Practices. Upon her retirement in 2016, she was earned the title of emerita and received UPenn's Claire M. Fagin Distinguished Researcher Award. Following her retirement, Deatrick continued to work with CHOP to advance cancer care and earned the 2017 Excellence in Family Nursing Award from the International Family Nursing Association.
