= Detrick, Virginia =

- Unincorporated community
- Location within the Commonwealth of Virginia Detrick (the United States)
- Coordinates: 38°51′17″N 78°24′26″W
- Country: United States
- State: Virginia
- County: Shenandoah
- Time zone: UTC−5 (Eastern (EST))
  - Summer (DST): UTC−4 (EDT)

Detrick is an unincorporated community in Shenandoah County, Virginia, United States. Detrick lies within Fort Valley at the crossroads of Virginia Secondary Route 678 (Fort Valley Road) and Seven Fountains Road.
