= William E. Dietrich =

American geologist

For other people with the same or similar name, see William Dietrich (disambiguation).

William Eric Dietrich (born 1950) is a professor of geology in the Department of Earth and Planetary Science at the University of California, Berkeley. His specialty is geomorphology, with a particular interest in the biological forces shaping landscapes. He obtained his Ph.D. in geology from the University of Washington. Dietrich was elected as a member of the United States National Academy of Sciences in 2003. In 2009, he was awarded the Robert E. Horton Medal by the American Geophysical Union.
