= Louise Dietrich =

American nurse, activist and suffragist

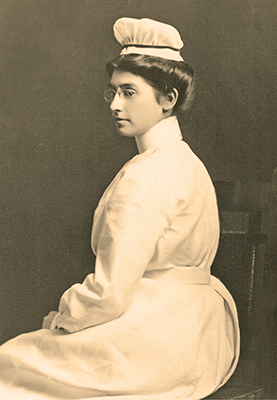
A. Louise Dietrich

A. Louise Dietrich (November 17, 1878 - January 22, 1962) was an American nurse, activist and suffragist who was based in El Paso, Texas. Dietrich came to El Paso in 1902 and stayed to help with the typhoid fever epidemic. In El Paso, she started the first nurses' registry in Texas and also created the El Paso Graduate Nurses Association. She worked at several hospitals both in El Paso and in other cities. Dietrich was one of the organizers and founders of St. Mark's Hospital in El Paso. Dietrich was active with the El Paso Equal Franchise League and later became a president of the Texas League of Women Voters (LWV). Dietrich served as secretary in both the Texas Graduate Nurses Association and the Texas Board of Nursing (BON). After Dietrich's death, she was honored by the Texas House of Representatives for her lifetime of work in nursing and other activism.

== Biography ==
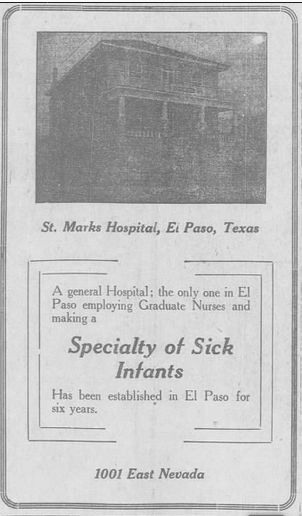
St. Marks Hospital, El Paso, Texas ad in 1914

Dietrich was born in Ossining, New York, and was one of eleven children. She graduated from St. John's Riverside Hospital in 1899 and went on to work as a private nurse in the state of New York. Dietrich came to El Paso, Texas "on the same train with Buffalo Bill" in 1902. Because of an epidemic of typhoid fever, Dietrich stayed on in El Paso, even though it wasn't her intended destination. She worked at Providence Hospital where she was a director and superintendent. At Providence, she started the first nurses' registry in Texas. Dietrich established the El Paso Graduate Nurses Association in 1903 and served as the first president of the organization. She resigned from Providence early in 1906.

Dietrich went to work at the St. Louis Skin and Cancer Hospital in 1907. She soon came back to El Paso to work at St. Marks Maternity Hospital as the superintendent. She was an attendee of the second Texas Graduate Nurses Association meeting, held in San Antonio in 1908. Dietrich helped to write a bill that required that nurses be registered with the state. The bill was passed in 1909. Also in 1909, Dietrich, nurse Emily Greene, and others organized and began to build a "woman's hospital" called St. Mark's Hospital in El Paso on the corner of Ange and Nevada streets. In the summers, Dietrich and Greene helped work at the Cloudcroft, New Mexico Baby Sanitorium. Dietrich went on to work as the St. Mark's Hospital superintendent until 1916.

Dietrich became involved in the Red Cross in 1912, serving on the Nursing Service Committee. She also provided classes on Red Cross work. During World War I, she stayed active with the Red Cross and also was involved in women's suffrage in El Paso. Dietrich was a member of the El Paso Equal Franchise League. She went on to help women register to vote, helping African American and Mexican women in El Paso register. Later, Dietrich became involved in the Texas League of Women Voters (LWV) and served as president from 1938 to 1940.

In 1923, Dietrich became the first educational secretary of the Texas Board of Nursing (BON). She became a general secretary of the BON and worked full-time for the group. In this capacity, she provided additional training for members of the Texas BON. She also was heavily involved in organizing many projects for the BON.

Dietrich also became a general secretary of the Texas Graduate Nurses Association. In 1954, she retired from the Texas Graduate Nurses Association. The next year she was honored by the El Paso Graduate Nurses Association for her lifetime of work. A fellowship grant was established in her name for graduate nurses to continue their professional education and for inactive nurses to return to the field.

Dietrich died on January 22, 1962, in El Paso. She was buried in Rest Lawn Cemetery in El Paso. In February 1962, the Texas House of Representatives honored her nursing work in Texas. They passed a resolution which said in part that Dietrich did "almost as much to improve and advance the profession of nursing as her revered predecessor, Florence Nightingale."
