= Diedrich =

Diedrich is both a masculine German given name and a German surname. Notable people with the name include:

== Given name ==
- Diedrich Bader (born 1966), American actor, voice actor and comedian
- Diedrich A. Bohlen (1827–1890), German-born American architect
- Diedrich Diederichsen (born 1957), German writer, music journalist and cultural critic
- Diedrich Henne (1834–1913), German-born Australian botanist
- Diedrich Hermann Westermann (1875–1956), German missionary, Africanist and linguist
- Diedrich Téllez (born 1984), Nicaraguan footballer
- Diedrich Uhlhorn (1764–1837), German engineer
- Diedrich Wattenberg (1909–1996), German astronomer
- Diedrich Willers Jr. (1833–1908), American politician

== Surname ==
- Friedrich Diedrich (1935–2015), German Roman Catholic theologian
- John Diedrich (born 1953), Australian actor, director and producer
- Michael Diedrich (1954–2025), American politician and attorney
- Szaundra Diedrich (born 1993), German judoka

== See also ==
- Diedrich Coffee, an American coffee company
- Diedrick, given name and surname
