= Amédée Baillot de Guerville =

French-American journalist (1869–913)

Sketch of de Guerville as a war correspondent in China, 1894. He carries a puppy he had found wandering on a battlefield near Port Arthur.

Amédée Baillot de Guerville (né Constantin Amédée Luce; 5 May 1869 – 21 May 1913), was a French-American freelance war correspondent, editor, and commercial agent, most frequently cited for his travel writing. He was best known in his day for his staunch defense of Japan in the aftermath of the Port Arthur Massacre of November 1894.

Born Constantin Amédée Luce in Paris, he was the illegitimate son of Anna Antoinette Aglaé Luce (died 1894) and Paul-Louis-Amédée Baillot, a clerk, merchant, and teacher of the French language. His parents married in England shortly after his birth, his father's third marriage.

His father, born Baillot, added his own mother's aristocratic surname de Guerville at some point. In 1847, in London had married Eliza Shamford Walter, with whom he had five children. The family moved to New York in the late 1850s, and Eliza died in Brooklyn in 1861. In 1866, his father married a second time in London to Charlotte Prenders, with whom he had another son, Louis Amédée Raymond Baillot, born in Paris in 1866.

Amédée took his father's name and immigrated to the United States in 1887 and became an American citizen in 1893.

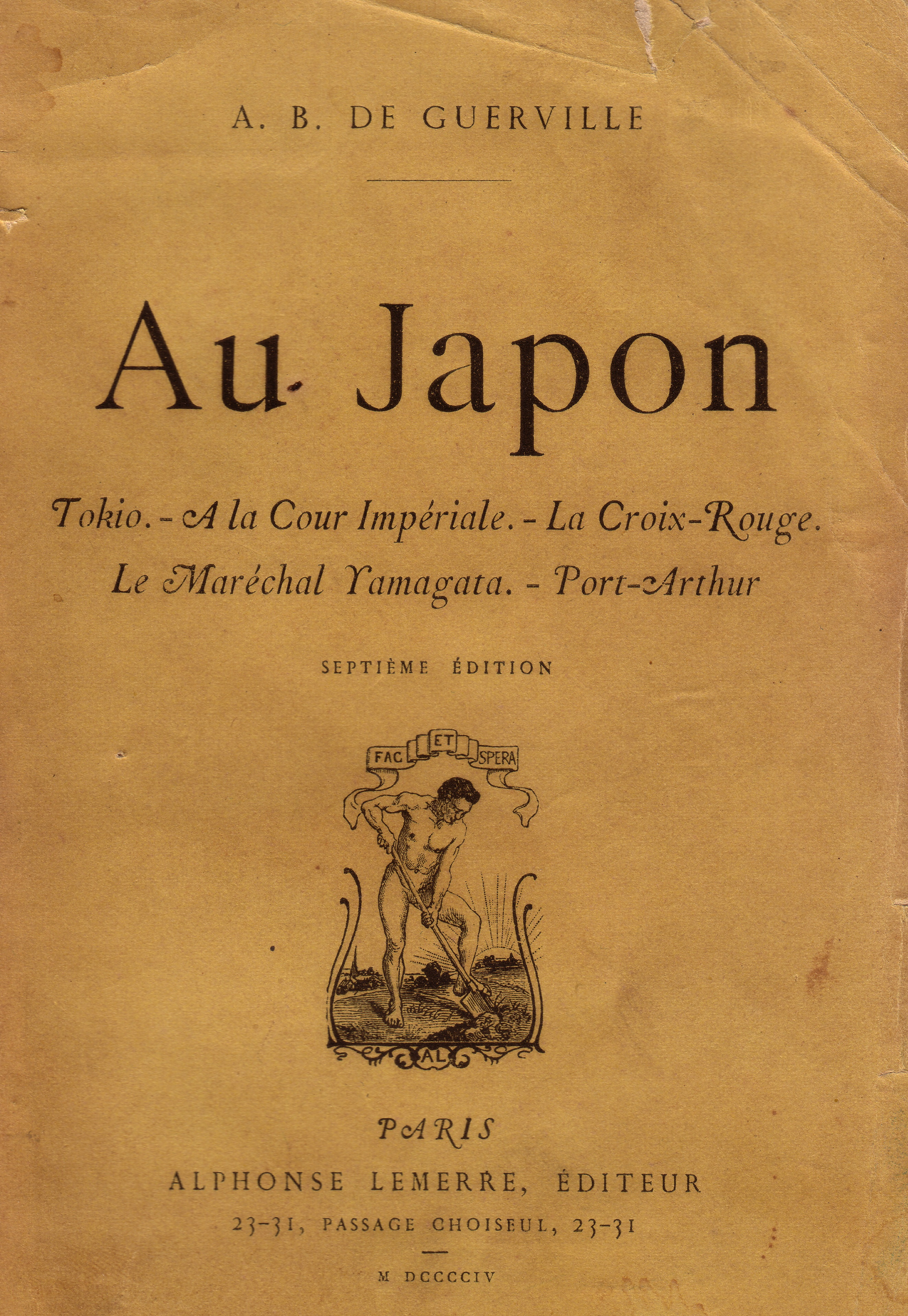
Cover of Au Japon (1904) by A.B. de Guerville, recounting his experiences in the Far East.

De Guerville began teaching French at Milwaukee Women's College in 1889. In 1890 he established the Le Courrier Francais newspaper for the Milwaukee and Chicago francophone community. Baillot began his career as commercial agent in 1891 with a stereopticon presentation of the 1889 Exposition Universelle de Paris (Paris World's Fair) to an audience in St. Paul, Minnesota. In 1892 de Guerville traveled to Japan, Korea, China, Ceylon, and Europe as a Special Commissioner for the World Columbian Exposition (the Chicago World's Fair) of 1893, where he promoted the event to kings, emperors, and heads of state.

In 1894, de Guerville returned to Asia, banking on contacts he had made during the brief time he spent there in 1892 to secure an assignment as special correspondent covering the Sino-Japanese War, then known simply as the China-Japan War, for the New York Herald under the direction of James Gordon Bennett, Jr. His primary competition was James Creelman, writing for The New York World. Creelman and Baillot came to journalistic blows regarding the massacre of Chinese civilians by Japanese troops at the Chinese city of Port Arthur on November 20–21, 1894. While Creelman, and other correspondents present, described a widescale and cold-blooded massacre, de Guerville alleged in the pages of the New York Herald that no such massacre had occurred.

In 1898, de Guerville became part-owner and manager of The Illustrated American, a New York monthly periodical. The offices of the journal were gutted by fire in 1899 and shortly thereafter, but not necessarily as a result of the fire, de Guerville left the United States for his native France never to return. In his version of events, the onset of a heretofore latent tuberculosis was the cause of his departure. By his own account, de Guerville experienced a near miraculous recovery from his tuberculosis while a patient at the pioneering Nordach Clinic for consumptives in Germany's Black Forest region. Thereafter he continued to travel and write for a short while, producing his memoirs of his experiences in the Far East entitled Au Japon (1904), in which he admitted that the massacre had occurred while insisting it was Japanese coolies who had done the butchering. He also wrote a well-received travelogue of British Egypt entitled New Egypt (1906). While in Egypt in 1906, A.B. de Guerville claimed to be the first man to race up the Nile in his motor-boat.

In the last years of his life de Guerville was reported to have lived in Lausanne, Switzerland. During these latter years he also purchased land from in Valecluse in the south of France, where he is credited with developing the land and expanding their golf course. He died in 1913, likely of the tuberculosis from which he claimed to have been cured. He is buried in the Alphonse Karr Cemetery in Saint-Raphaël, France.

== Personal life ==
De Guerville married Laura Belle Spraker, scion of a well-established New York family, in 1896 in New York City. In 1900, Mrs. A.B. de Guerville filed for bankruptcy and divorce. He married again in London in 1909 to Rosie Grimley.
