= Diderik =

- Gender: Male
- Language: Norwegian

Origin
- Origin: From Theodoric

Other names
- Alternative spelling: Didrik
- Related names: Diederik

Diderik or Didrik is a Norwegian male given name. In North Germanic languages, the native form would be Tjodrik, but Diderik and Didrik have been loaned from Low German and are now a common name in Norway. It may also be a variant of the related Dutch name Diederik. People with the name include:

- Diderik Batens (born 1944), Belgian logician and epistemologist at the University of Ghent
- Diderik Bøgvad (1792–1857), Norwegian politician
- Diderik von Cappelen (1761–1828), Norwegian merchant and politician
- Diderik Hegermann Rye (1832–1914), Norwegian civil servant
- Diderik Hegermann (1763–1835), Norwegian councillor of state and Minister of the Army
- Diderik Schnitler (born 1946), Norwegian businessperson
- Diderik Iversen Tønseth (1818–1893), Norwegian politician for the Liberal Party
- Diderik Wagenaar (born 1946), Dutch composer and musical theorist
- Didrik Pining (c. 1430–1491), German privateer, nobleman and governor of Iceland
