= Diederik =

- Gender: Male
- Language: Dutch

Origin
- Origin: From Theodoric
- Region of origin: Netherlands, Flanders

Other names
- Alternative spelling: Dirk, Diderik, Diederick
- Derived: Dirk, Derick, Derek,
- Related names: Diderik

Diederik is a Dutch male given name. People with the name include:

- Diederik Aerts (born 1953), Belgian theoretical physicist
- Diederik Bangma (born 1990), Dutch football goalkeeper
- Diederik Boer (born 1980), Dutch footballer
- Diederik Boomsma (born 1978), Dutch politician
- Diederik van Dijk (born 1971), Dutch politician
- Diederik van Domburg (1685–1736), Dutch governor of Ceylon
- Diederik Durven (1676–1740), Dutch Governor-General of the Dutch East Indies
- Diederik Foubert (born 1961), Belgian cyclist
- Diederik Jansz. Graeff (1532–1589), Dutch merchant, ship-owner and politician
- Diederik Grit (1949–2012), Dutch translator and translation scholar
- Diederik Hol (born 1972), Dutch design engineer
- Diederik Korteweg (1848–1941), Dutch mathematician
- Diederik Jekel (born 1984), Dutch science journalist and television presenter
- Diederik Johannes Opperman (1914–1985), Afrikaans poet
- Diederik van Rooijen (born 1975), Dutch film director
- Diederik Samsom (born 1971), Dutch politician
- Diederik van Silfhout (born 1988), Dutch Olympic dressage rider
- Diederik Simon (born 1970), Dutch rower
- Diederik Sonoy (1529–1597), Dutch rebel leader during the Eighty Years' War
- Diederik Stapel (born 1966), Dutch social psychologist
- Diederik Tulp (1624–1682), Dutch merchant
- Diederik Jacob van Tuyll van Serooskerken (1772–1826), Dutch nobleman, later Russian major general and ambassador
- Diederik van Weel (born 1973), Dutch field hockey player
- Diederik Wissels (born 1960), Dutch jazz pianist

== See also ==
- Diederik cuckoo, in which Diederik is an onomatopoeic rendition of the bird's call
- Diedrick, given name and surname
- Theodoric
