= Dietrich (disambiguation) =

Dietrich is a given name.

Dietrich may also refer to:

- Dietrich, Idaho, United States
- Dietrich, Pennsylvania
- Dietrich Industries
- Dietrich College of Humanities and Social Sciences, at Carnegie Mellon University
- Dietrich School of Arts and Sciences, at the University of Pittsburgh
- Dietrich Inc.
