= WWE Music Group =

American record label

- Parent company: WWE (TKO Group Holdings)
- Founded: 2006 (as WWE Music Group)
- Founder: Vince McMahon
- Distributor: Virgin Music Group
- Genre: Various
- Country of origin: United States
- Location: 780 Third Avenue, New York City, U.S.
- Official website: wwe.com/inside/wwemusic

WWE Music Publishing, Inc., trade name WWE Music Group, is an American record label funded and operated by WWE, a division of TKO Group Holdings, a majority-owned subsidiary of Endeavor Group Holdings. It was manufactured and co-marketed by Columbia Records and was distributed by Sony Music. The label specializes in the production of theme songs serving as the WWE wrestlers' entrance music, sometimes by contributing performing artists, but also releases titles that have been actually performed by the wrestlers themselves, including the various-artists album WWE Originals and John Cena's You Can't See Me, peaking at number 12 and 15 on the US Billboard 200, respectively.

Historically, most WWE entrance themes have been created by Jim Johnston since the 1980s, while in recent times, themes have been written or performed by John Alicastro and Mike Lauri, known collectively as CFO$ from 2012 to 2020. Since 2020, DJDTP, a music production company based in New York, is responsible for all themes used by WWE using the pseudonym "def rebel", and made their first theme in 2019.

== History ==
=== Beginnings ===
The series of WWE (WWF) produced albums began in 1985 with The Wrestling Album. The album contained the song "Land of a Thousand Dances", recorded by a majority of the WWF roster at the time (including Roddy Piper, Jesse Ventura, and Randy Savage). The locker room would later reconvene for the song's music video.

Later in 1993, WrestleMania: The Album was released, but it failed to chart on the Billboard 200. By 2002, however, it had sold a total of 91,000 copies.

=== Format change and success ===
The format of the wrestling albums changed in 1996, as the focus went from the wrestlers themselves singing to a compilation of various wrestlers' entrance themes. WWF Full Metal: The Album was the first album released with the new focus, and included the Monday Night Raw theme "Thorn in Your Eye" by Slam Jam, a supergroup composed of members of metal bands Anthrax, Savatage, Pro-Pain, and Overkill. In October, the album reached No. 184 on the Billboard 200 and by 2002, had sold 173,000 copies. This new format proved to be a success. The follow-up album, WWF The Music, Vol. 2, which was released two years later, spent sixteen weeks on the chart and sold over 480,000 copies.

WWF The Music, Vol. 3 and WWF The Music, Vol. 4, released in December 1998 and November 1999 respectively, each sold over one million copies. In particular, Vol. 3 reached No. 10 on the Billboard 200, spent thirty weeks on the chart, and sold over 1.21 million copies. The album reached position No. 4 in its début week, stayed on the charts for twenty weeks, and sold over 1.13 million copies.

On March 21, 2000, the company worked with Priority Records to release a hip hop music album titled WWF Aggression, which involved rappers such as Snoop Dogg, Ol' Dirty Bastard, Method Man, and Kool Keith, all of whom recorded versions of various wrestlers' entrance themes. This album differed from previous albums, which were more along the lines of rock music. Despite the change, the album still sold approximately 640,000 copies.

In October 2000, WWE announced the launch of the record label under the name SmackDown! Records, with Ron McCarrell as the president.

In February 2001, WWF The Music, Vol. 5 débuted on the Billboard 200 at position No. 2, spending two weeks in the top twenty and selling 176,000 copies. as well as reaching No. 2 in the UK Albums Chart and No. 5 in the Canadian Albums Chart. The album included an original song by Dwayne Johnson. By 2002, Vol. 5 had sold 640,000 copies. In September 2001, the WWF Tough Enough album sold 138,000 copies.

In May 2001, WWE signed their first act, the heavy metal band Neurotica, and released their third album in June 2002, the only non-wrestling related album released on the label so far, before they disbanded.

In 2002, WWF Forceable Entry sold 145,000 copies in its first week to enter the Billboard 200 at position No. 3. It was the fourth consecutive WWE album to début in the top ten of the Billboard 200. Forceable Entry also débuted on the Billboard Hard Rock Albums Chart. The album included music from Creed, Our Lady Peace, Limp Bizkit, Marilyn Manson, Kid Rock, Drowning Pool, Rob Zombie, Sevendust, and Saliva. Later in the year, WWE Anthology was certified platinum after just 10 days of release.

As of March 2006, WWE officially announced the launching of the "WWE Music Group" under the management of Neil Lawi, who not only maintains the label but selects songs to be used on television and pay-per-view events, and regularly scouts new talent to showcase via WWE. Within two months of operation, the newly restructured label had an album reach the top 10 of the Billboard 200 when WWE Wreckless Intent, with songs by artists such as Motörhead, Three 6 Mafia, P.O.D., and Killswitch Engage, reached No. 8. In 2007, the label released ¡Quiero Vivir!, the début album of WWE ring announcer Lilian Garcia, in conjunction with Universal Music Latin Entertainment.

In 2007, WWE released WWE The Music, Volume 7, the company's first digital-only album, on iTunes, and starting in 2012, WWE began making old albums available through online stores, starting with the first five "Volume" albums released from 1995 to 2001.

On April 20, 2013, the entrance theme of wrestler Fandango reached No. 44 in the UK Singles Chart, after briefly being close to the Top 10 in the mid-week charts. Following the NXT Arrival show on February 27, 2014, WWE released singles of eight NXT wrestlers created by CFO$, and it was followed in May by the music video and single of Tyler Breeze.

On November 30, 2017, it was reported that Jim Johnston's contract with the WWE had expired and that the company had released him after more than thirty-two years of employment.

=== Disputed issues ===
Composer James D. Papa filed a lawsuit against the WWE Music Group, Michael Hayes, and Jim Johnston in July 2012 over the use of the music from World Championship Wrestling, citing redirected royalty payments to several wrestling related songs he either wrote or co-wrote by securing the rights to music unlawfully. Along with the defendants of the case were long with VE Newco LLC, the parent company of Gaiam Vivendi Entertainment (distribution of WWE DVD and Blu-rays), Yuke's (WWE video games), and Take-Two Interactive (who owns the WWE video game license after THQ filed for bankruptcy in January 2013) were added in September 2013.

The filing noted that the two sides resolved their issues following an alternative dispute resolution conference because there are a number of WWE Network versions of list of NWA/WCW closed-circuit events and pay-per-view events using all 11 songs from the Slam Jam CD that were placed on the Network, replacing versions of the PPV that had edited out the original music. A similar lawsuit brought against the company by Harry Slash & The Slashtones and Roderick Kohn over the rights to original music used by Extreme Championship Wrestling that WWE had been using during the Invasion was resolved with a settlement that saw WWE purchase the catalogue outright in January 2005 along with the assets in 2003 in bankruptcy court.

The case was then settled in court on May 5, 2014, before the March 23, 2015, trial date. However, WWE has again denied any wrongdoing and claimed that since Papa "consented to use" of his music in WCW and World Class Championship Wrestling broadcasts, and subsequently, WWE would have the rights to his material since they acquired the copyrights lawfully. WWE also said that the music in the World Class documentary would be "fair use" and that Papa did not have any copyright for the "clone song" that Johnston created, so any claim against that song should be thrown out.

== In other media ==
- In September 2017, a commercial for Toyota Camry used John Cena's entrance theme "The Time is Now".
- In NHL 17, Adam Rose's entrance theme song, "Break Away" by CFO$ is used as the goal song for the Ottawa Senators.
- In the 2017–18 NHL season, the Washington Capitals used Oney Lorcan's theme song "Combative" by CFO$ as their official goal song.
- Since 2019, UFC fighter Colby Covington uses Kurt Angle's theme song "Medal" by Jim Johnston as his walkout song.
- During UFC 276, UFC fighter Israel Adesanya made a special entrance using The Undertaker's theme song "Rest In Peace" by Jim Johnston as his walkout song.

== Discography ==
=== Compilation albums ===
Album	Release date	Tracks	Notes
The Wrestling Album	1985	10	
Piledriver: The Wrestling Album II	1987	10	
WrestleMania: The Album	July 1993	10	
WWF Full Metal: The Album	1996	14	Reissued outside North America as WWF Champions: The Album – Full Metal Edition in 1996
WWF The Music, Volume 2	November 18, 1997	15	
Hits of the World Wrestling Federation: We Gotta Wrestle	1997	15	Alternate version of Volume 2 released outside the United States
WWF The Music, Volume 3	December 29, 1998	14	
WWF The Music, Volume 4	November 2, 1999	14	
WWF Aggression	March 21, 2000	13	Featured songs by commercial artists performing themes
WWF The Music, Vol. 5	February 20, 2001	14	
WWF Tough Enough	September 18, 2001	13	
WWF Forceable Entry	March 26, 2002	18	Last album sold under the WWF banner
WWF Tough Enough 2	May 14, 2002	14	
WWE Anthology	November 12, 2002	86	Three-disc compilation
WWE Originals	January 13, 2004	17	Original songs recorded by wrestlers
ThemeAddict: WWE The Music, Vol. 6	November 15, 2004	16	Released with a bonus DVD featuring entrance videos
WWE Wreckless Intent	May 23, 2006	15	
WWE The Music, Vol. 7	March 16, 2007	21	Download only
RAW Greatest Hits: The Music	December 18, 2007	19	
WWE The Music, Vol. 8	March 25, 2008 (US); March 24, 2008 (UK)	14	
Voices: WWE The Music, Vol. 9	January 24, 2009 (Australia); January 27, 2009 (US); April 13, 2009 (UK)	13	
WWE The Music: A New Day, Vol. 10	January 28, 2010	14	.
Stone Cold Steve Austin: The Entrance Music EP	June 13, 2011	4	
Hall of Fame 2012 – The Music	March 25, 2012	16	
WWE The Music: The Beginning	July 16, 2012	80	
WrestleMania – The Music 2013	April 1, 2013	23	
SummerSlam – The Music 2013	August 16, 2013	20	
The Federation Era	April 1, 2014	23	
The Music of WCW	April 1, 2014	60	
WrestleMania – The Music 2014	April 7, 2014	62	
The Music of the WWE Network	April 14, 2014	8	
Total Divas: The Music	March 6, 2015	12	
WWE Tough Enough: The Music	June 22, 2015	3	
WWE: Undertaker – From the Vault	March 20, 2016	21	
WWE: Uncaged	December 16, 2016	16	
WWE: Uncaged II	March 17, 2017	16	
WWE: Uncaged III	August 21, 2017	16	
WWE: Uncaged IV	November 20, 2017	12	
WWE: Uncaged V	August 20, 2018	14	
WWE: Uncaged VI	October 26, 2018	14	
WWE: Uncaged VII	January 25, 2019	13	
WWE: Uncaged VIII	May 17, 2019	13	
WWE: Uncaged IX	August 9, 2019	21	
WWE: Uncaged X	October 4, 2019	25	
WWE: Uncaged XI	January 31, 2020	12	
WWE: Uncaged XII	April 3, 2020	14	
WWE: Uncaged XIII	August 21, 2020	15	
WWE: Uncaged XIV	November 20, 2020	53	
WWE: Uncaged XV	February 7, 2021	25	

=== Single-artist albums ===
Album	Tracks	Release date	Notes
Neurotica (Neurotica)	11	June 25, 2002	
You Can't See Me (John Cena & Tha Trademarc)	17	May 10, 2005 (US); May 30, 2005 (UK)	
¡Quiero Vivir! (Lilian Garcia)	12	October 9, 2007	Joint release with Universal Music Latino
A Jingle with Jillian (Jillian Hall)	7	December 11, 2007	
Walk with Elias (Elias)	4	July 22, 2018	
Universal Truth (Elias)	4	October 26, 2020	

=== Soundtrack albums ===
Album	Tracks	Release date	Notes
Legendary (Music From the Motion Picture) (James Alan Johnston & Various Artists)	26	September 28, 2010	
Knucklehead (Music From the Motion Picture) (James Alan Johnston and various artists)	26	November 2, 2010	
The Chaperone (Music From the Motion Picture) (James Alan Johnston and various artists)	21	February 18, 2011	
Inside Out (Music From the Motion Picture) (James Alan Johnston and various artists)	22	September 8, 2011	
The Reunion (Music From the Motion Picture) (Jim Johnston and various artists)	31	October 20, 2011	
WWE 2K15: The Soundtrack (Various Artists)	10	October 21, 2014	Released through Atlantic Records.

== See also ==
- Music in professional wrestling
- TNA Knockout Music
- Lists of record labels
