= WWE The Music =

Music albums in the WWE The Music series, formerly the WWF The Music series, include:

- WWF Full Metal: The Album, 1995, considered to be Volume 1
- WWF The Music, Volume 2 in 1997
- WWF The Music, Volume 3 in 1998
- WWF The Music, Volume 4 in 1999
- WWF The Music, Vol. 5 in 2001
- ThemeAddict: WWE The Music, Vol. 6 in 2004
- WWE The Music, Volume 7 in 2007
- WWE The Music, Volume 8 in 2008
- Voices: WWE The Music, Vol. 9 in 2009
- WWE The Music: A New Day, Vol. 10 in 2010
- WWE The Music: The Beginning, 2012

== See also ==
- WWE Music Group
