= Raw Greatest Hits: The Music =

Compilation album by World Wrestling Entertainment
- Released: December 18, 2007
- Recorded: 1993–2007
- Genre: Rock; Hard Rock; Hip Hop
- Length: 52:34
- Label: Columbia, WWE Music Group
- Producer: D. Pitman, Edward Murry, J. Grinnage, John Cena, M. Predka, Russell, Robert L.

World Wrestling Entertainment chronology
WWE The Music, Volume 7 (2007)	Raw Greatest Hits: The Music (2007)	WWE The Music, Vol. 8 (2008)

Raw Greatest Hits: The Music is a compilation album released by World Wrestling Entertainment (WWE) on December 18, 2007, to coincide with the 15th anniversary of the TV program, Monday Night RAW. It features theme-music of Raw roster-members of the time - as well as that of former members.

The album, the first WWE album-release to feature the themes "Turn Up the Trouble" for Mr. Kennedy and "Paparazzi" for Melina/MNM, also marks the first time a bonus track from a previous WWE album, Kane's theme "Slow Chemical" by Finger Eleven (previously a bonus track on Canadian and FYE store releases of 2002's WWF Forceable Entry), appears as one of the main tracks. It also features main tracks from a previous album: Randy Orton's theme "Burn in My Light" by Mercy Drive, and Shane McMahon's WWE-produced theme "Here Comes the Money", as exclusive (in this case, to releases sold at Wal-Mart and the United Kingdom) bonus tracks. It was Re-Released by WWE as WWE: Raw Greatest Hits - The Music exclusively on iTunes with 3 bonus tracks.

== Track listing ==
Track	Artist	Song	Subject	Length
1	John Cena and Tha Trademarc	"The Time is Now"	John Cena	2:58
2	Jim Johnston	"I Won't Do What You Tell Me"	Stone Cold Steve Austin	3:03
3	Jim Johnston	"If You Smell..."	The Rock	2:56
4	Motörhead	"The Game"	Triple H	3:29
5	Shawn Michaels	"Sexy Boy"	Shawn Michaels	3:22
6	Jim Johnston	"Rest in Peace"	The Undertaker	3:16
7	Jim Johnston with Peter Bursuker	"No Chance In Hell"	Mr. McMahon	1:59
8	Saliva	"I Walk Alone"	Batista	4:08
9	Motörhead	"Line In the Sand"	Evolution	3:40
10	Jim Johnston with Adam Morenoff	"Break the Walls Down"	Chris Jericho	2:03
11	Jim Johnston	"Wreck"	Mick Foley	3:02
12	Jim Johnston with Lil' Kim	"Time to Rock & Roll"	Trish Stratus	3:13
13	Jim Johnston with Chris Classic	"(619)"	Rey Mysterio	2:50
14	Finger Eleven	"Slow Chemical"	Kane	3:42
15	Jim Johnston with Chris Warren	"Are You Ready?"	D-Generation X	2:14
16	Jim Johnston	"Paparazzi"	Melina	3:06
17	Jim Johnston with Ted Nigro	"Turn Up the Trouble"	Mr. Kennedy	3:33

UK & Wal-Mart Edition Bonus Tracks

Track	Artist	Song	Subject	Length
18	Jim Johnston and Naughty by Nature	"Here Comes the Money"	Shane McMahon	2:47
19	Mercy Drive	"Burn In My Light"	Randy Orton	3:58

Re-Released Edition Bonus Tracks

Track	Artist	Song	Subject	Length
18	Jim Johnston	"Enchanted Isle"	Primo & Epico	3:50
19	Jim Johnston	"Meat on the Table (Shell Shocked Mix)"	Ryback	2:46
20	Sugar Tongue Slim	"Making Moves"	The Prime Time Players	3:13

== See also ==
- Music in professional wrestling
