= Line in the Sand (Motörhead song) =

Song by Motörhead

from the album WWE ThemeAddict: The Music, Vol. 6
- Released: 2004
- Recorded: May 2003
- Genre: Heavy metal
- Length: 3:43
- Label: WWE Records
- Songwriter(s): Jim Johnston

Line in the Sand is a 2004 rock song from WWE's soundtrack album, WWE ThemeAddict: The Music, Vol. 6. The song used to be the entrance theme of the professional wrestling alliance, Evolution. The song is performed by Motörhead.

== History ==
"Line in the Sand" was recorded in May 2003 for the newly formed alliance Evolution, consisting of Triple H, Ric Flair, Batista and Randy Orton. The song was recorded by Motörhead, the band, who has also sung two of Triple H's entrance themes, "The Game" and "King of Kings". The song became the entrance theme for the stable. It used to be the entrance when 2-4 members came to the ring together. During a one-on-one match, Triple H, Flair and Batista would each use their own entrances, while Orton would also use "Line in the Sand" as his entrance, until he was kicked out of the group in August 2004. The song was included in WWE's 2004 soundtrack album, ThemeAddict: The Music, Vol. 6. The group continued the use of the song, until its end in 2005.

The song was used by Evolution again, when Triple H, Flair and Batista reunited the stable for one-night only in December 2007. As a result, the song was included in WWE's 2007 compilation album, Raw Greatest Hits: The Music. It is also featured in the video games WWE 13 and WWE 2K15.

The song was used once more on the April 14, 2014 episode of Raw, when Orton, Triple H, and Batista reunited the stable once more in a post-match confrontation with the Shield.
