= WWE Wreckless Intent =

Compilation album by World Wrestling Entertainment
- Released: May 23, 2006
- Genre: Rock, pop, dance, hip hop, rapcore, heavy metal, alternative rock, nu metal, pop punk, metalcore
- Length: 53:52
- Label: Columbia
- Producer: Kevin Dunn; Jim Johnston

World Wrestling Entertainment chronology
WWE ThemeAddict: The Music, Vol. 6 (2004)	WWE Wreckless Intent (2006)	WWE The Music, Volume 7 (2007)

WWE Wreckless Intent is a compilation album released by WWE on May 23, 2006. The album is the sequel to the previously released WWF Forceable Entry, and like its predecessor it featured rock and metal artists performing versions of the wrestlers' entrance themes. A noted change with this album compared to the Forceable Entry album is the incorporation of rap and hip-hop artists (similar to the format used on the WWF Aggression album) doing versions of entrance themes as well as providing additional original tracks. This also marks as one of the last WWE albums being released by Columbia Records.

== Track listing ==
Track	Artist	Song	Subject^{†}	Writer(s)	Producer(s)	Length
1	Saliva	"I Walk Alone"	Batista	James A. Johnston, Saliva	Paul Ebersold	4:12
2	Mercy Drive	"Burn in My Light"	Randy Orton	Johnston, Jimmy McGlothlin, Jake Beard, Corey Lane	Mercy Drive	4:25
3	Homebwoi	"Hard Hittin'"	Coach	Michal Crooms, Eric Jackson, Deongelo Holmes, James Maddox Jr.	Mr. Collipark	4:06
4	Brand New Sin	"Crank It Up"	Big Show	Johnston	Johnston	4:28
5	Desiree Jackson	"Holla"	Candice Michelle	Johnston	Kirv, Johnston	3:28
6	Eleventh Hour	"A Girl Like That"	Torrie Wilson	Johnston	Johnston	3:07
7	Kaballon	"Quien Soy Yo (Who I Am)"	Carlito	Johnston	DJ Chucky	3:26
8	Theory of a Deadman	"Deadly Game"	No Way Out (2006)	Johnston	Gavin Brown	3:09
9	Silkk the Shocker	"I'm Comin'"	MVP	Johnston	Johnston	3:32
10	Shadows Fall	"Fury of the Storm"	Rob Van Dam	Johnston, Brian Fair	Johnston	3:37
11	Three 6 Mafia	"Some Bodies Gonna Get It"	Mark Henry	Johnston, Jordan Houston, Paul Beauregard, Darnell Carlton	Three 6 Mafia	3:35
12	Zebrahead	"With Legs Like That"	Maria	Johnston	Cameron Webb / Zebrahead	3:07
13	Killswitch Engage	"This Fire Burns"	Judgment Day (2006)	Johnston, Howard Jones, Adam Dutkiewicz, Joel Stroetzel, Michael D'Antonio, Justin Foley		3:05
14	P.O.D.	"Booyaka 619"	Rey Mysterio	Thomas Lopez, P.O.D.		3:12
15	Motörhead	"King of Kings"	Triple H	Johnston	Webb	3:58

^{†} The subject as seen in the official track listing. Some tracks were not assigned a subject. The subject of the song may differ from what is/was being used in WWE. For more details, see Notes.

=== Wal-Mart and Japan bonus tracks ===
Track	Artist	Song	Subject	Length
16	Drowning Pool	"Rise Up"	WWE SmackDown	2:54
17	Eric & the Hostiles	"Pay the Price"	The Great American Bash (2005)/Charlie Haas	3:40

== Production ==
Two working titles for the album were Forceable Entry 2 and Wreckless.

Tego Calderón, Avenged Sevenfold, John Cena, and Chunk were at one point mentioned to be artists featured on the album. Due to creative differences, Chunk did not make it onto the final track listing. Disturbed was originally approached for making a new theme for Triple H, but Motörhead made the final cut.

Avenged Sevenfold recorded a cover of Pantera's "Walk" for the album, but it was cut and later released on the Kerrang! compilation.

The song "Rise Up 2006!" performed by former Drowning Pool lead singer Ryan McCombs is a remake of "Rise Up!", performed by Jason "Gong" Jones and featured on the WWE ThemeAddict: The Music, Vol. 6 album.

== Release ==
Professional ratings
Review scores
Source	Rating
Allmusic	3/5 stars
IGN	7/10 stars
411Mania	6.5/10 stars

The album was originally slated for a January release, but due to heavy time constraints, the release date was pushed back to May. The first few hundred people who pre-ordered the album on sonymusicstore.com got a free booklet autographed, as well as a WWE ball keychain. At WWEShop.com, a free signed John Cena trading card was given for each copy of the album.

=== Reception ===
The album debuted in the Billboard 200 at #8.

== See also ==
- Music in professional wrestling
- WWF Aggression
- WWF Forceable Entry

== Notes ==
- Although "I'm Comin'" by Silkk the Shocker and "This Fire Burns" by Killswitch Engage are not attributed to a superstar on the album, they have since been used by MVP and CM Punk, respectively. Randy Orton also briefly used a modified version of "This Fire" as his theme, along with it being the theme for Pay-Per-View event Judgment Day in 2006.
- "Holla" by Desiree Jackson was originally attributed to Candice Michelle, and then later used by Kelly Kelly, and was featured on Voices: WWE The Music, Vol. 9 as her theme. "With Legs Like That" by Zebrahead was originally intended for Stacy Keibler, however the track was never given to her due to her departure from the WWE. It was then relocated to Maria. Since Torrie Wilson's retirement, Tiffany used "A Girl Like That" as her theme song.
- "Deadly Game" by Theory of a Deadman was a cover version of the original song for the event Survivor Series in 1998. The original version can be found on WWE Anthology on its "Attitude Era" disc.
- "Quien Soy Yo (Who I Am)" was never used on a WWE broadcast.
- "Booyaka 619" samples Bad Boys by Inner Circle.
- "Fury of the Storm" was used in WWE SmackDown vs. Raw 2007 as Rob Van Dam's in-game entrance theme.
