= Chris Warren (musician) =

American musician (1967–2016)

- Born: May 27, 1967; Huntington, New York, United States
- Origin: New York City
- Died: June 12, 2016 (aged 49)
- Genres: Rap metal, rap rock
- Occupation: Singer
- Instrument: Vocals
- Years active: 1997–2009
- Formerly of: The DX Band

Christopher P. Warren (May 27, 1967 – June 12, 2016) was an American musician who performed in numerous bands, the last being New York band Bro-Kin. He is best known for being the lead singer in The DX Band (sometimes referred to as The Chris Warren Band), a group who performed entrance themes for many stars and shows of professional wrestling over the years. They are mainly known for the songs "My Time" for Triple H and "Break It Down" for stable D-Generation X.

== Career ==
=== World Wrestling Federation (1997–2000) ===
Warren is known to professional wrestling fans as the voice behind the DX entrance music, and after Jim Johnston (head of WWE music) became so impressed with Warren, that he offered him further vocal work. Over the course of the next four years, Warren recorded several songs for the WWF (now known as WWE). In 1998, Warren made his television debut at WrestleMania XIV, performing a screeching version of "America The Beautiful" and "The Star-Spangled Banner", for which he was booed, as the fans and national media in attendance considered the performance disrespectful and of poor quality. The performance was never released on home video and was edited out of the recent WWE Network version of the show. Warren and the band also performed the DX ring entrance music later the same night as DX came to the ring, and again five months later at the 1998 SummerSlam, which received a much more positive ovation from the fans and media. Later that year Warren recorded the vocals for Triple H's theme "My Time". This song was featured on the platinum album WWF The Music, Vol. 4. He also recorded the Superstars theme from 1997. His last appearance was a cameo on the Run-D.M.C. "The Kings" music video, directed by David Sahadi. Warren, along with Bro-Kin, recorded an unreleased song for WWE's Tough Enough II which never made it onto the show.

=== Total Nonstop Action Wrestling (2007–2008) ===
In July 2007, Warren and Bro-Kin signed an agreement with Total Nonstop Action Wrestling (TNA), which involved use of the band's music on TNA's TV shows (such as TNA Impact!), PPVs and DVDs worldwide. Their song "Low" was used as the theme for No Surrender 2007, "Separate" for Genesis 2007 and "For the Vein" for Final Resolution January 2008. Further cuts of other songs appeared (and continue to do so) on various TNA video packages.

=== Bro-Kin (2009) ===
On March 5, 2009, Warren announced via Bro-Kin's website that the band had released their album La Violencia on iTunes, Amazon and Napster.

=== Return to WWE (2009) ===
Warren returned to WWE headquarters in Stamford, Connecticut, in August 2009 to record vocals to a new DX theme, coinciding with the return of the D-Generation X stable consisting of Triple H and Shawn Michaels, to active WWE competition. The recording session saw Warren re-united in the studio with WWE music composer Jim Johnston for the first time in over seven years.

== Personal life and death ==
Warren was born in Huntington, Long Island, NY on May 27, 1967, to Christopher J. and Barbara Warren and lived in Rockland County, New York. Warren was employed by Local 638 NYC as a steamfitter for many years. He died unexpectedly on June 12, 2016, at the age of 49.

== Discography ==
- WWF The Music, Vol. 3 (December 29, 1998)
- WWF The Music, Vol. 4 (November 2, 1999)
- WWF Aggression (March 21, 2000)
- WWE Anthology (November 12, 2002)
- RAW Greatest Hits: The Music (December 18, 2007)
- Bro-Kin – La Violencia (March 6, 2009)

== Interviews ==
- Chris Warren Radio Interview (Part 1 of 4) courtesy of The Squared Circle radio show
- Chris Warren Radio Interview (Part 2 of 4) courtesy of The Squared Circle radio show
- Chris Warren Radio Interview (Part 3 of 4) courtesy of The Squared Circle radio show
- Chris Warren Radio Interview (Part 4 of 4) courtesy of The Squared Circle radio show
