= Voices: WWE The Music, Vol. 9 =

- Cover of the album. From left to right: Eve Torres, R-Truth, Vladimir Kozlov, Randy Orton, The Great Khali, Kelly Kelly, and Umaga.

Compilation album by World Wrestling Entertainment
- Released: January 24, 2009
- Length: 40:49 / 65:49
- Label: Columbia, WWE Music Group
- Producer: Jim Johnston

World Wrestling Entertainment chronology
WWE The Music, Vol. 8 (2008)	Voices: WWE The Music, Vol. 9 (2009)	WWE The Music: A New Day, Vol. 10 (2010)

Voices: WWE The Music, Vol. 9 is a compilation album released by World Wrestling Entertainment (WWE) in the United States and Canada on January 27, 2009, Australia on January 24 and in the United Kingdom on April 13, 2009. The album was originally announced to be a three-CD set featuring new music by Jim Johnston and alternate mixes of older material from the past 25 years to commemorate the WrestleMania 25th anniversary. However, the album is now a single disc of original theme music, with a bonus disc containing a selection of past theme music.

The working title for the album was WWE Anthology II and was originally set to be the sequel to WWE's 2002 album WWE Anthology. The album reached a peak at number 11 on the Billboard 200 chart.

It was re-released on iTunes on January 26, 2014, with the original track list and a remixed version of Jake "The Snake" Roberts entrance theme.

== Track listing ==
All songs are composed, written and produced by Jim Johnston except "What's Up?", written and composed by Ron Killings (R-Truth).

Track	Song	Subject^{†}	Length
1	"Voices" (Vocals by Rich Luzzi of Rev Theory)	Randy Orton	3:24
2	"Pourquoi?"	Maryse	3:37
3	"Man on Fire"	Kane	2:57
4	"Kung Fu San" (performed by Karl "Dice Raw" Jenkins)	Kung Fu Naki	3:04
5	"Holla" (performed by Desiree Jackson)	Kelly Kelly	3:19
6	"What's Up?" (performed by Ron Killings)	R-Truth	3:15
7	"Pain"	Vladimir Kozlov	2:54
8	"Land of Five Rivers" (Vocals by Kulvinder Singh Johal) & (Dhol by Panjabi MC)	The Great Khali	2:58
9	"She Looks Good"	Eve	2:17
10	"Get on Your Knees" (performed by Age Against the Machine – Rage tribute)	Jack Swagger	3:10
11	"If You Rock Like Me"	SmackDown Theme	3:03
12	"Tribal Trouble"	Umaga	3:08
13	"Priceless"	Ted DiBiase/Cody Rhodes/Manu	3:44

^{†} The subject as seen in the official track listing. The subject of the song may differ from what is currently used in WWE.

A two-disc, deluxe edition of Vol. 9 is available exclusively at Best Buy stores which includes the Legends of WWE CD, featuring:

Track	Song	Subject	Length
1^{*}	"I Won't Do What You Tell Me"	Stone Cold Steve Austin	3:02
2	"Unstable"	Ultimate Warrior	1:45
3	"Hot Rod"	Roddy Piper	2:58
4	"Hard Corps."	Sgt. Slaughter	2:35
5	"Blue Blood"	Hunter Hearst Helmsley	3:29
6	"Perfection"	Mr. Perfect	2:49
7^{*}	"Rest in Peace"	The Undertaker	3:18
8	"Snake Bit"	Jake Roberts	2:08
9^{*}	"If You Smell...?"	The Rock	2:56

^{*} These tracks are also included as bonus tracks on the regular CD release in the UK. Numbered 14, 15 and 16 respectively.

== iTunes re-release track listing ==
All songs are composed, written and produced by Jim Johnston except "What's Up?", written and composed by Ron Killings (R-Truth).

Track	Song	Subject^{†}	Length
1	"Voices" (Vocals by Rich Luzzi of Rev Theory)	Randy Orton	3:24
2	"Pourquoi?"	Maryse	3:37
3	"Man on Fire"	Kane	2:57
4	"Kung Fu San" (performed by Karl "Dice Raw" Jenkins)	Kung Fu Naki	3:04
5	"Holla" (performed by Desiree Jackson)	Kelly Kelly	3:19
6	"What's Up?" (performed by Ron Killings)	R-Truth	3:15
7	"Pain"	Vladimir Kozlov	2:54
8	"Land of Five Rivers" (Vocals by Kulvinder Singh Johal) & (Dhol by Panjabi MC)	The Great Khali	2:58
9	"She Looks Good"	Eve	2:17
10	"Get on Your Knees" (performed by Rage Against the Machine – Rage tribute)	Jack Swagger	3:10
11	"If You Rock Like Me"	SmackDown Theme	3:03
12	"Tribal Trouble"	Umaga	3:08
13	"Priceless"	Ted DiBiase/Cody Rhodes/Manu	3:44
14	"I Won't Do What You Tell Me"	Steve Austin	3:02
15	"Unstable"	Ultimate Warrior	1:45
16	"Hot Rod"	Roddy Piper	2:58
17	"Hard Corps."	Sgt. Slaughter	2:35
18	"Blue Blood"	Hunter Hearst Helmsley	3:29
19	"Perfection"	Mr. Perfect	2:49
20	"Rest in Peace"	The Undertaker	3:18
21	"Snake Bit 2014"	Jake Roberts	3:19
22	"If You Smell...?"	The Rock	2:56

== Release history ==
Country	Date
Australia	January 24, 2009
United States	January 27, 2009
United Kingdom	April 13, 2009

== See also ==
- Music in professional wrestling
