= A Jingle with Jillian =

EP by Jillian
- Released: December 11, 2007
- Recorded: 2007
- Genre: Pop
- Length: 14:22
- Label: WWE Records
- Producer: Jim Johnston

A Jingle with Jillian is an Extended play (EP) by WWE female wrestler Jillian. The EP was released by WWE Records on December 11, 2007. Hall performed all the songs in her character of a poor singer. The album reached number 20 on the UK Holidays Top 100 shortly after its release before climbing onto the Top 50 albums on iTunes.

In late 2010, two bonus tracks were added.

== Reception ==
RD Reynolds of WrestleCrap called the album “without hyperbole, the greatest Christmas album in the history of...well...history.”

== Track listing ==
1. “Have Yourself a Merry Little Christmas”- 3:15
2. “Jingle Bell Rock”- 2:29
3. “I'll Be Home for Christmas”- 2:54
4. "Rockin' Around the Christmas Tree”- 2:17
5. “The Christmas Song”- 3:27
6. “Santa Baby” (2010 bonus track)- 2:50
7. “It's Christmas (All Over the World)” (2010 bonus track)- 3:27

== See also ==
- Music in professional wrestling
