= WWE The Music, Volume 8 =

Compilation album by World Wrestling Entertainment
- Released: March 25, 2008
- Genre: Rock
- Length: 49:09 (US version) / 58:35 (UK version)
- Label: Columbia, WWE Music Group
- Producer: Jim Johnston

World Wrestling Entertainment chronology
Raw Greatest Hits: The Music (2007)	WWE The Music, Volume 8 (2008)	Voices: WWE The Music, Vol. 9 (2009)

WWE The Music, Volume 8 is a compilation album released by WWE on March 25, 2008. Unlike Volume 7, which was released exclusively on iTunes, Volume 8 was sold as a CD (much like other WWE music albums) in addition to being offered on iTunes.

== Track listing ==
All tracks were written by Jim Johnston.

Track	Song	Performer	Subject	Length
1	"No More Words"	EndeverafteR	Jeff Hardy	4:23
2	"S.O.S."	Collie Buddz	Kofi Kingston	3:31
3	"Glamazon"		Beth Phoenix	2:49
4	"The Wall"	Heet Mob	Mark Henry	3:09
5	"In the Middle of It Now"	Disciple	Curt Hawkins and Zack Ryder	4:10
6	"Sliced Bread"	Jillian Hall	Jillian Hall	3:10
7	"No Chance in Hell"	Theory of a Deadman	Mr. McMahon	2:55
8	"Don't Question My Heart"	Saliva, featuring Brent Smith	ECW	3:39
9	"Biscuits & Gravy"	Nick Sproviero	Jesse and Festus	3:34
10	"What Love Is"	Scooter & Lavelle	Candice Michelle	3:36
11	"Ain't No Make Believe"	Stonefree Experience	John Morrison	4:19
12	"Ain't No Stoppin' Me (Remix)"	Axel	Shelton Benjamin	3:07
13	"Turn Up the Trouble"	Airbourne	Mr. Kennedy	3:13
14	"Break the Walls Down"	Golden State	Chris Jericho	3:33

Three bonus tracks sold exclusively through Wal-Mart include:

Track	Song	Performer	Subject	Length
15	"Let's Light A Fire Tonight"	Aiden	Ashley Massaro	3:04
16	"Hes Ma Da"		Hornswoggle	2:33
17	"La Vittoria è Mia" ("Victory Is Mine")	Victor Khodadad	Santino Marella	3:48

== Release history ==
Country	Date
United Kingdom	March 24, 2008
United States	March 25, 2008

== See also ==
- Music in professional wrestling
