= WWE: Uncaged VI =

Compilation album by World Wrestling Entertainment
- Released: October 26, 2018
- Length: 41:12
- Label: WWE Music Group
- Producer: Jim Johnston

World Wrestling Entertainment chronology
WWE: Uncaged V (2018)	WWE: Uncaged VI (2018)	WWE: Uncaged VII (2019)

WWE: Uncaged VI is a compilation album of unreleased professional wrestling entrance theme songs which was released by WWE on October 26, 2018 on online music stores. The album features multiple tracks that were not available to the general public before the release of the album.

== Track listing ==
All songs are composed, written and produced by Jim Johnston.

Track	Song	Subject	Length
1	"Pourquoi? (Bourgeoisie Remix)"	Maryse	3:26
2	"Hurt You"	Katie Lea	3:26
3	"Strong and Sexy (Stronger)"	Gail Kim	3:11
4	"Party On"	DJ Gabriel & Alicia Fox	3:19
5	"Tropical Storm (Pacific Islands Remix)"	Tamina	2:21
6	"The Girl Next Door"	Stacy Keibler	2:42
7	"Yeah Baby"	Natalya	2:47
8	"Glamazon (Championship Remix)"	Beth Phoenix	3:18
9	"What Love Is (RnB Remix)"	Candice Michelle	2:11
10	"Don't Mess With (2005)"	Victoria	3:19
11	"Molly Holly"	Molly Holly	3:08
12	"Made of Ivory"	Ivory	2:52
13	"Who's That Girl"	Emma	3:20
14	"All Grown Up (General Manager Remix)"	Stephanie McMahon	1:52

== See also ==
- Music in professional wrestling
