= WWE The Music: A New Day, Vol. 10 =

Compilation album by World Wrestling Entertainment
- Released: January 28, 2010 (Amazon only)
- Genres: Rap, rock, pop, dance, metal
- Length: 54:45
- Label: WWE Music Group
- Producer: Jim Johnston

World Wrestling Entertainment chronology
| Voices: WWE The Music, Vol. 9 (2009) | WWE The Music: A New Day, Vol. 10 (2010) | Stone Cold Steve Austin: The Entrance Music EP (2011) |

WWE The Music: A New Day, Vol. 10 is a compilation album released by World Wrestling Entertainment (WWE) on January 28, 2010. Unlike previous albums in the series, the album was released both in CD-R and digital download forms, exclusively on Amazon.com in the United States, the United Kingdom, Germany and France.

== Track listing ==
All tracks were written by Jim Johnston.

| Track | Song | Artist | Superstar(s) | Length |
|---|---|---|---|---|
| 1 | "It's a New Day" | Adelitas Way | The Legacy | 3:04 |
| 2 | "I Am Perfection" | Cage9 | Dolph Ziggler | 3:19 |
| 3 | "I Came to Play" | Downstait | The Miz | 4:57 |
| 4 | "Just Close Your Eyes" | Story of the Year | Christian | 4:31 |
| 5 | "Return the Hitman" | Jim Johnston | Bret Hart | 5:37 |
| 6 | "Written in My Face" | Sean Jenness | Sheamus | 3:33 |
| 7 | "Insatiable" | Patsy Grime | Tiffany | 3:10 |
| 8 | "Domination" | Evan Jones | Ezekiel Jackson | 4:17 |
| 9 | "Born to Win" | Mutiny Within | Evan Bourne | 4:17 |
| 10 | "Oh Puerto Rico" | Vinny & Ray and Marlyn Jimenez | Primo | 3:32 |
| 11 | "Radio" | Watt White | Zack Ryder | 4:02 |
| 12 | "New Foundation" | Jim Johnston | The Hart Dynasty | 3:32 |
| 13 | "You Can Look (But You Can't Touch)" | Kim Sozzi | The Bella Twins | 3:47 |
| 14 | "Crank the Walls Down" | Maylene and the Sons of Disaster | Jeri-Show (Chris Jericho and Big Show) | 3:07 |

== See also ==
- Music in professional wrestling
