= Sexual Chocolate (disambiguation) =

Sexual Chocolate is a ring name of American professional wrestler Mark Henry.

Sexual Chocolate may also refer to:

- Sexual Chocolate, a nickname of cricketer Ryan Sidebottom
- "Sexual Chocolate", Mark Henry's theme song, found on WWF The Music, Vol. 4
- "Sexual Chocolate", a song by CeeLo Green from Violator: The Album, V2.0
- Sexual Chocolate, a fictional musical group in the 1988 film Coming to America
