= WrestleMania (disambiguation) =

WrestleMania is the annual flagship professional wrestling premium live event of WWE, the world's largest professional wrestling promotion.

WrestleMania may also refer to:

- WrestleMania I (1985), the original WrestleMania

== Television ==
- "WrestleMania", an episode of Hogan Knows Best
- WrestleMania Backlash, the alternative name of WWE's Backlash event in 2021 and 2022
- "WrestleMania Raw", a special episode of WWE Raw held the Monday before WrestleMania
- "WrestleMania SmackDown", a special episode of WWE SmackDown held the night before WrestleMania

== Video games ==
- WWF WrestleMania (1989 video game)
- WWF WrestleMania (1991 video game)
- WWF WrestleMania: The Arcade Game, 1995

== Other uses ==
- WrestleMania: The Album, a 1993 album by WWE, at the time known as the World Wrestling Federation
