= H-Blockx =

German rock band

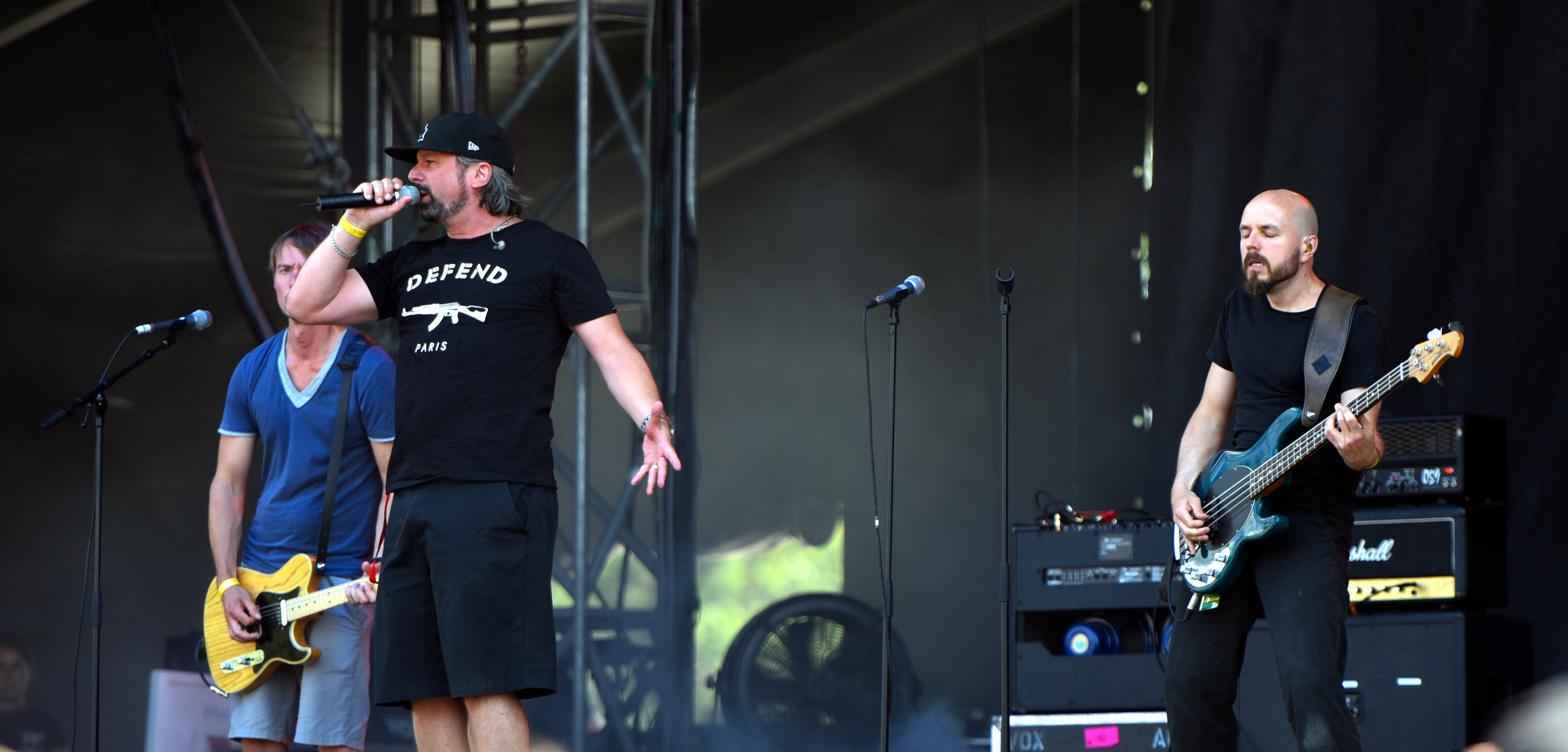
- H-Blockx performing in 2015

Background information
- Origin: Münster, Germany
- Genres: Alternative rock; alternative metal; nu metal; rap metal
- Years active: 1991–present
- Labels: BMG; Sing Sing; BMG Berlin Musik GmbH; Supersonic; X-Cell
- Members: Henning Wehland; Stephan "Gudze" Hinz; Tim Tenambergen; Steffen Wilmking
- Past members: Dave Gappa; Fabio Trentini; Johann-Christop "Mason" Maass; Marco Minnemann; Martin "Dog" Kessler
- Website: h-blockx.net

H-Blockx is a German rock band founded in Münster in 1991. After the success of their debut album in 1994, Time to Move, the band received a nomination for Best Breakthrough Artist at the 1995 MTV Europe Music Awards. In 1999, the World Wrestling Federation contacted them to record a song, "Oh Hell Yeah", for wrestler Stone Cold Steve Austin, and their song "Countdown to Insanity" appears in the European version of the 2007 music video game Rock Band. Between 1994 and 2012, H-Blockx released seven studio albums.

== History ==
The band's name is a tribute to the 1981 Irish hunger strikers of HM Prison Maze, colloquially called the 'H-Blocks', though Henning Wehland has stated the band is not political. The band rose to fame with their successful debut album, Time to Move, released in 1994 on Sing Sing Records, and produced by Ralph Quick and Chris Wagner. The music videos for "Risin' High" and "Move" received considerable airplay on MTV. The band earned a nomination for "Best Breakthrough Artist" at the following MTV Europe Music Awards, however, the award went to Dog Eat Dog. With the help of the singles "Risin' High", "Move", and "Little Girl", their debut spent 62 weeks in the German album chart, selling over 750,000 copies worldwide, and earning the band their first gold album. Their first major tour followed. In 1999, World Wrestling Federation contacted the band to record a song, "Oh Hell Yeah", for wrestler Stone Cold Steve Austin. Although it was never used as his theme song, it became synonymous with Austin and was released on WWF The Music, Vol. 4. A reworked version of "Oh Hell Yeah" was featured on the 2002 WWE Anthology album The Attitude Era.

None of their following albums have been as successful as Time to Move was. However, with the release of Get in the Ring in 2002 on Supersonic Records in association with BMG they did have a minor hit with their cover of "The Power" featuring rapper Turbo B; Turbo B also performs the original version with Snap!

In 2004, the band's album No Excuses reached No. 14 on the German album charts. It was then supported by an extensive European tour. In early 2005 and 2006 in Malmö, Sweden, their 2007 album Open Letter To A Friend was recorded. They were accompanied by H-Blockx producer Andreas "Boogieman" Herbig who was with them in 1994 when Time To Move was completed. Their single "Countdown to Insanity" from the album is one of the playable tracks included on the European version of the game Rock Band, and is available to download with the US version. Ending a five-year absence from the recording studio, the band released their album HBLX in May 2012.

In 2013, the band's song "Gazoline" was used for the trailer and soundtrack for the video game Sunset Overdrive, along with several other rock and metal songs.

After appearing only sporadically in preceding years, the band played at some festivals between 2022 and 2024. In October 2024, they embarked on a headliner tour to celebrate the 30-year anniversary of their debut album Time to Move, for which also former singer Dave Gappa joined to perform on a couple of songs. They played a new song called Fallout and hinted at more new music and a tour in 2025.

A new single Straight_Outta_Nowhere including a music video was released in August 2025, followed by Lights_Out at the end of September. In October 2025, they embarked on the Fillin_the_Blank tour, while announcing a new album of the same name for release in March 2026.

== Band members ==
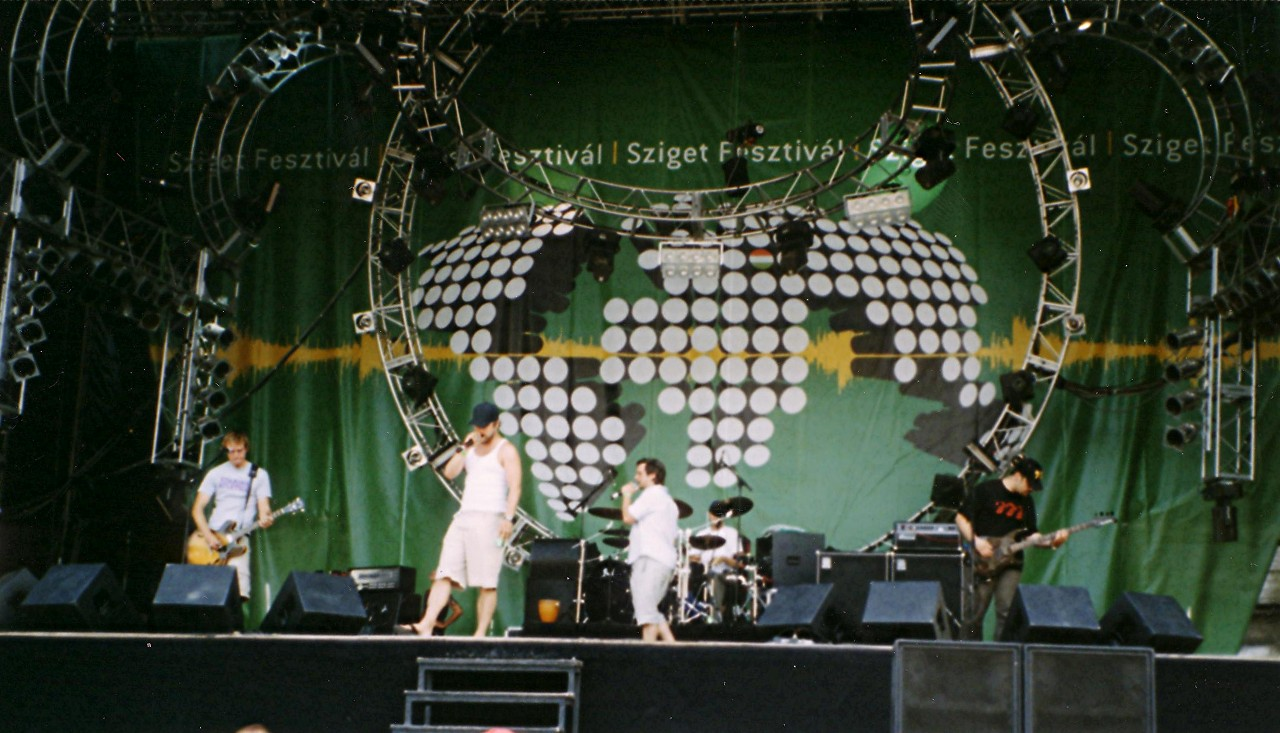
H-Blockx in a 2003 performance

=== Current members ===
- Henning Wehland – vocals (1990–present)
- Tim "Humpe" Tenambergen – guitar (1990–present)
- Stephan "Gudze" Hinz – bass (1990–2003, 2007–present)
- Steffen Wilmking – drums (1999–2001, 2003–present)

=== Past members ===
- Johann Christoph "Mason" Maass – drums (1990–1998)
- Dave Gappa – vocals (1992–2001, 2003–2005)
- Marco Minnemann – drums (1998–1999)
- Martin "Dog" Kessler – drums (2001–2003)
- Fabio Trentini – bass (2003–2007)

== Discography ==
=== Studio albums ===
Year	Title	GER	AUT	SWI
1994	Time to Move	14	11	8
1996	Discover My Soul	7	5	15
1998	Fly Eyes	19	20	44
2002	Get in the Ring	14	21	45
2004	No Excuses	14	23	53
2007	Open Letter to a Friend	14	43	51
2012	HBLX	31	66	85
2026	Fillin_The_Blank	3	59	53

=== Compilation albums ===
Year	Title	GER
1999	Bang Boom Bang	30
2004	More Than a Decade	66

=== Guest appearances ===
- 2001 – Brennstoff by Das Department (V2 Records, "Tinitus")

=== Compilation appearances ===
- 1994 – White Magic – Soundtrack (BMG Ariola München GmbH, "Move")
- 1995 – Always Music '95 (BMG Ariola Special Projects, "Move (The Radio)")
- 1995 – De Afrekening Volume 9 (Columbia Records, "Move")
- 1995 – Internationale Hits 95 (Ariola Records, "Risin' High")
- 1995 – Just the Best Vol. 4 (Polystar Records, "Risin' High (Video Cut)")
- 1995 – Just the Best Vol. 6 cassette (Polystar Records, "Little Girl (Video Version)")
- 1995 – Just the Best Vol. 6 CD (Polystar Records, "Little Girl (Video Version)")
- 1995 – Popcorn – Hyper Dance Power (Ariola, BMG Ariola Media GmbH, "Risin' High")
- 1995 – Rockgarden Vol. 3 (EVA Belgium, "Risin' High")
- 1995 – Rockgarden Volume 3 (EVA Records, "Risin' High")
- 1995 – Stop Chirac (RCA Records, "Revolution")
- 1995 – Top of the Pops 1 (Columbia Records, "Move")
- 1995 – Wild CD 02 (Wild Magazine, "Move")
- 1995 – Crossing All Over! - Vol. 3 (GUN Records, BMG, "Revolution")
- 1996 – Fresh (Sonet, PolyGram Finland Oy, "Little Girl")
- 1996 – Jam – Vol. 3 (BMG Ariola Hamburg GmbH, "How Do You Feel?")
- 1996 – Quote 97 – Niemals Einer Meinung (Eastwest Records, "Little Girl")
- 1996 – Zoo Magazine CD Sampler 04 (Zoo Magazine (DK), "How Do You Feel?")
- 1997 – Bravo Super Show 1997 – Volume 4 (BMG Ariola Media GmbH, "Step Back")
- 1997 – Radio FM4 Soundselection (BMG Ariola Austria GmbH, "Step Back (Loop Version)")
- 1997 – Vivamania Volume 1 (Sony Music Entertainment (Germany), "Move")
- 1999 – Crossing All Over! - The Classix (Supersonic Records, BMG, "Risin' High")
- 1999 – Pop 2000–50 Jahre Popmusik Und Jugendkultur In Deutschland (Grönland Records,"Risin' High)
- 1999 – WWF the Music Vol.4 – Oh Hell Yeah (Stone Cold Steve Austin)
- 2000 – Bravo Hits 29 (Warner Special Marketing GmbH, Bertelsmann Club, "Ring of Fire")
- 2000 – Lords of the Boards 2000 (Modul Records, "Time of My Life")
- 2000 – The Dome Vol. 14 (BMG Ariola, "Ring of Fire")
- 2000 – Viva Hits 9 (Polystar Records, "Ring of Fire (Video Version)")
- 2001 – Monsterhits (EMM (EMI Music Media), "Ring of Fire (Video Version)")
- 2002 – Chart Boxx – Second Highlights (Top 13 Music-Club, "The Power (Single Version)")
- 2002 – Fetenhits – New Rock Party (Polystar Records, "The Power")
- 2002 – Pepsi Chart Album (Oy EMI Finland Ab, BMG Finland, Universal Music (Finland), "The Power")
- 2002 – Rock Zone Special (BMG Russia, "How Do You Feel?")
- 2004 – Off Road Tracks Vol. 80 (Metal Hammer (Germany), "Where's The Message?")
- 2006 – American Chopper (EMI Electrola, "Leave Me Alone")
- 2007 – Dynamit Vol. 57 (RockHard Records, "I Don't Want You To Like Me")

=== Singles ===
Year	Single	Peak chart positions				Album
Year	Single	GER	AUS	AUT	SWI	Album
1993	"Risin' High"	34	—	—	—	Time to Move
1994	"Move"	34	—	—	—	Time to Move
1994	"Little Girl"	—	—	—	—	Time to Move
1996	"How Do You Feel"	—	—	—	28	Discover My Soul
1996	"Step Back"	—	—	—	—	Discover My Soul
1998	"Fly"	—	—	—	—	Fly Eyes
1998	"Take Me Home"	—	—	—	—	Fly Eyes
2000	"Ring of Fire" (featuring Dr. Ring-Ding)	13	—	10	42	Get in the Ring
2001	"C'mon" (featuring B & K)	83	—	—	—	Get in the Ring
2002	"The Power" (featuring Turbo B)	48	34	51	—	Get in the Ring
2004	"Leave Me Alone"	55	—	59	—	No Excuses
2004	"Celebrate Youth"	42	—	—	—	No Excuses
2007	"Countdown to Insanity"	35	—	51	—	Open Letter to a Friend
"—" denotes the single did not chart or was not released in that country

== See also ==
- List of Sony BMG artists
