= Debbie Taylor =

American soul and jazz singer (born 1947)

- Also known as: Maydie Myles
- Born: Maddie Bell Galvin; June 23, 1947 (age 79); Norfolk, Virginia, United States
- Genres: Soul, R&B, jazz
- Instrument: Vocals
- Years active: 1964–1975, 1990s–present
- Labels: Decca, GWP records, Arista

Maydie Myles (born Maddie Bell Galvin, June 23, 1947) is an American soul and jazz singer who is highly acclaimed for her recordings in the 1960s and 1970s when she was known professionally as Debbie Taylor. Her most successful record, "Never Gonna Let Him Know", reached the Billboard pop chart in 1969.

== Early life ==
She was born Maddie Bell Galvin in Norfolk, Virginia. Her first name was pronounced "Maydie", a spelling she later adopted. As a young child she sang gospel in her father's church, and while a teenager toured nationally as a gospel singer. She began performing with a jazz trio led by her high school music teacher, Reginald Walker, and also toured with a gospel group who performed at the 1965 World Fair. Because of her family's religious views, she adopted the stage name Debbie Taylor when singing in clubs in Norfolk with R&B musicians, and in 1967 she was seen there by Joe Medlin, a regional talent scout for Decca Records.

== Recording career ==
After her mother signed a contract with Decca allowing her to record as Debbie Taylor, she began recording at the Royal Studio owned by Willie Mitchell in Memphis, Tennessee. Her first session in 1968 produced the tracks “I Get the Blues" and "The Last Laugh Is on The Blues” (Decca 32090), followed by "Check Yourself" / "Wait Until I'm Gone" (Decca 32259). Written by Isaac Hayes and David Porter, who produced an unreleased version of the song by Ruby Johnson, Taylor's version of "Check Yourself" reached #37 on the R&B chart in 1968. The song, "a haunting blues-flavoured ballad", featured an "emotive performance" by Taylor.

In March 1969, she started recording for the New York-based GWP label started by Gerard Purcell, which ran its affairs from 150 East 52nd Street. Her first record, "Never Gonna Let Him Know" (GWP 501), launched the label and reached #18 on the national R&B chart and #86 on the pop chart. However, later releases on GWP were less commercially successful. In 1972, she left the label. Purcell teamed her with Terry Phillips and Boo Frazier at Perception Records, and they recorded her first album, Comin' Down On You, produced by David Jordan, arranged by Patrick Adams, and issued by the Today label. Jordan also produced sessions with her backed by MFSB in Philadelphia, which included the single "I Have Learned To Do Without You", co-written by Jordan with J. J. Barnes and Don Davis, which was issued by Polydor Records in late 1973. However, commercial success still eluded her.

In 1975 she recorded "I Don’t Wanna Leave You" with Jordan in New York, with a full band and orchestra featuring Earl Van Dyke on keyboards. The recording was leased to Arista Records, and the single rose to #32 on the R&B chart and #100 on the pop chart at the end of 1975. The single was also released in the UK and Europe but in an inferior edited version. In later years, the song and its B-side, "Just Don't Pay", both written by Jordan, became popular on the Northern Soul scene in the UK. However, the relative failure of her career in the US, and her unwillingness to sign an exclusive deal with Arista, led Taylor to retire from the music business for several years.

== Later life and re-emergence ==
After a short-lived marriage in the 1970s, she was known privately as Maydie Miles. In the early 1980s, she relocated to Stamford, Connecticut, and later to nearby Norwalk, where she was the featured vocalist on several dance tracks issued by K4B Records between 1994 and 1998. As Maydie Myles, she also performed with her band in local clubs, and recorded radio sessions, advertisements and jingles, as well as being a vocalist on several entrance themes for WWE, a few of which were featured on the company's Anthology compilation. At that time, it was not known publicly that she had previously recorded as Debbie Taylor; the whereabouts of Debbie Taylor were unknown.

In early 2011, Maydie Myles self-released a jazz CD, The Ones I Love, and revealed her earlier career as Debbie Taylor. This resulted in substantial new interest in her career, and a remixed version of "Just Don't Pay" was issued in the UK in late 2011. In November 2013, she performed a sell-out one-off show in the UK.

== Discography ==
=== Decca Records 7" discography ===
1. "I Get the Blues" (Don Bryant) / "The Last Laugh is on the Blues" (Buddy Scott, Jimmy Radcliffe) Produced by Joe Medlin - Cat No: 32090 released 1968.
2. "Check Yourself" (David Porter, Isaac Hayes) / "Wait Until I'm Gone" (Willa Dean Parker, Henderson Thigpen). Produced by Joe Medlin - Cat No: 32259 released 1968.

=== GWP Records 7" discography ===
1. "Never Gonna Let Him Know" (R Dahrouge, B Terrell) / "Let's Prove Them Wrong" (E Jones, G Kerr). Produced by George Kerr and Paul Robinson - Cat No: GWP-501 released 1969.
2. "Don't Let it End" (T McQueen) / "How Long Can This Last" (E Jones, A Mitchell). Produced by Paul Robinson and George Kerr. Cat No: GWP-510 released 1969.
3. "Momma, Look Sharp" (Sherman Edwards) flipside to The Hesitations / "No Brag Just Fact" (L Banks, H Rooney). Produced by Paul Robinson. Cat No: GWP-512 released 1969.

=== GWP Grapevine 7" discography ===
1. "Don't Nobody Mess with my Baby" (R Dahrouge, B Terrell) / "Stop". Produced by R Dahrouge, B Terrell, ED Bland. Cat No: GRA-202 DJ Copy released 1970.

=== Today Records album ===
Comin' Down on You - Cat No: TLP 1007 - Released 1972

1. "No If's, And's or But's"
2. "(I Can't Believe I'm) Touchin' You"
3. "Too Sad to Tell"
4. "Second to None"
5. "Romance Without Finance"
6. "Leaving Him Tomorrow"
7. "No Deposit, No Return"
8. "Eye Doctor"
9. "Jeremiah"

=== Today Records 7" discography ===
1. "No Deposit, No Return" (David Jordan, Patrick P Adams) / "Too Sad to Tell" (Maurice Irby jnr, T Philips). Produced by Patrick P Adams & David Jordan. Cat No: T-1510-A/B released 1972.

=== Polydor Records 7" discography ===
1. "I Have Learned to Do Without You" (David Jordan, D Davis, J Barnes) / Same. Produced by David Jordan, Arranged by Richard Rome, Cat No: PD 14219 - Promo/Demo copy 1973 - No commercial release.
2. "I Have Learned to Do Without You" (David Jordan, D Davis, J Barnes) / "Cheaper in the Long Run" (David Jordan). Produced by David Jordan, Arranged by Richard Rome, Cat No: PD 14219 - released 1973.
3. "Superstar" / "A Good Woman Don't Grow on Trees" Cat No: Polydor 14252 - scheduled 1973/1974 but never released.

=== Arista Records 7" discography ===
1. "I Don't Wanna Leave You" runtime 3:58 (D Jordan, A Smith) / "I Don't Wanna Leave You" runtime 5:30. Produced by David Jordan, Tom Moulton mix, mastered by Jose Rodriguez. Cat No: AS-0144 - Promo/Demo copy 1975 - not commercially released (label mispress on 5:30 version).
2. "I Don't Wanna Leave You" runtime 3:15 (D Jordan, A Smith) / "I Don't Wanna Leave You" runtime 5:30. Produced by David Jordan, Tom Moulton mix, mastered by Jose Rodriguez. Cat No: ASDJ-0144 - Promo/Demo/DJ copy 1975 - not commercially released.
3. "Just Don't Pay" (D Jordan, A Smith) / "I Don't Wanna Leave You" runtime 5:30. Produced by David Jordan, Tom Moulton mix, Cat No: AS-0144 - released 1975.
4. "I Don't Wanna Leave You" runtime 3:58 (D Jordan, A Smith) / "Just Don't Pay" (D Jordan, A Smith). Produced by David Jordan, Tom Moulton mix, Cat No: Arista 50 - UK Demo. Commercially released in 1976.

=== Reissues ===
1. Still Comin' Down on Ya!. Track listing as with Comin' Down on You. CD format reissued by Sequel Records. Cat (UPC) No: 502322409412, release date September 9, 1997.
2. Soul Twins, Volume I - A twin set release of JJ Barnes's Born Again album and Comin Down on You. CD format reissued by Today / Sanctuary (UK). Cat (UPC) no: 5050749415011. Release date May 28, 2007.
3. "Just Don't Pay (Long version)" / "Just Don't Pay" was reissued on the Shotgun records label (Cat no: 110) on November 7, 2011.

=== Compilations ===
1. "I Have Learned to do Without You" appears on the compilation album Urban Classics III released by Urban Records / Polydor (UK). Vinyl format only. Released 1989.
2. "Too Sad to Tell" appears on the Doors of Perception compilation album. CD format released by Castle. Release date September 24, 2001.
3. "Too Sad to Tell" also appears on the compilation album Sisters of Soul. CD format released by Castle. Release date 2004 Cat No: CMQCD903.
4. The tracks "Let's Prove Them Wrong", "Don't Let it End", "Don't Nobody Mess With my Baby" and "All That I Have" (with the Hesitations) appear on the GWP NYC TCB compilation CD issued by Kent in the UK. Release date 2006. Cat No: Kent (CDKEND 249).
