= WWF The Music, Volume 2 =

1997 soundtrack album by World Wrestling Federation

Compilation album by World Wrestling Federation
- Released: November 18, 1997
- Genre: Soundtrack
- Label: Koch
- Producer: Jim Johnston

World Wrestling Federation chronology
WWF Full Metal: The Album (1995)	WWF The Music, Volume 2 (1997)	WWF The Music, Volume 3 (1998)

WWF The Music, Volume 2 is the second compilation album by the World Wrestling Federation (now known as the World Wrestling Entertainment, or WWE) on November 18, 1997. It primarily features contemporary theme songs of wrestlers on the roster at the time.

== Track listing ==
All tracks are written by Jim Johnston, except "Sexy Boy" by J. Hart, J.J. Maguire and Jim Johnston.

No.	Title	Subject	Length
1.	"Dark Side"	The Undertaker	3:53
2.	"Hell Frozen Over"	Stone Cold Steve Austin	2:57
3.	"Pearl River Rip"	Ahmed Johnson	3:15
4.	"Wild Cat"	Marc Mero & Sable	2:52
5.	"You Start the Fire"	Bret Hart	3:10
6.	"Mastodon"	Vader	3:09
7.	"Ode to Freud"	Mankind	3:02
8.	"Dude Love"	Dude Love	3:08
9.	"Nation of Domination"	Faarooq	3:03
10.	"Destiny"	Rocky Maivia	3:06
11.	"Snap"	Sycho Sid	3:19
12.	"Dangerous"	Ken Shamrock	3:17
13.	"Can't Get Enough"	Flash Funk	3:25
14.	"I Know You Want Me"	Sunny	3:28
15.	"Sexy Boy"	Shawn Michaels	3:00

iTunes bonus tracks
No.	Title	Length
16.	"I Am Perfection (Dolph Ziggler)" (performed by Beta Wolf)	3:33
17.	"King of Kings (Triple H)" (Original Jim Johnston Demo)	4:22

== Hits of the World Wrestling Federation: We Gotta Wrestle ==
Hits of the World Wrestling Federation: We Gotta Wrestle

Compilation album by World Wrestling Federation
- Released: February 18, 1997
- Recorded: 1996/1997
- Genre: Soundtrack
- Label: Koch Records
- Producer: Jim Johnston

World Wrestling Federation chronology
WWF The Music, Volume 2 (1997)	Hits of the World Wrestling Federation: We Gotta Wrestle (1997)	WWF The Music, Volume 3 (1998)

Earlier in 1997, a similar album was released outside the United States titled Hits of the World Wrestling Federation: We Gotta Wrestle. The album, which included a Sunny poster and a sticker sheet, was missing two tracks from Volume 2, Ken Shamrock and Dude Love's themes, but added Jake "The Snake" Roberts' and Faarooq's themes which were not included on Volume 2. It also differed in six tracks:

- track 2 (Marc Mero & Sable - "Wild Cat") this is the first theme and is on "Volume 2", the "We Gotta Wrestle" version is shorter at 2:51, "We Gotta Wrestle" version was re-released on Volume 2
- track 3 (Ahmed Johnson - "Pearl River Rip") length is shorter at 2:45 vs. Volume 2 at 3:15; the theme debuted on "Volume 2"
- track 9 (Faarooq - " We Are The Nation") includes rapping by PG-13; this is the first version the second version is on "We Gotta Wrestle" version and included an early instrumental of the theme in early 1997
- track 11 (Rocky Maivia - "Destiny") was The Rock's first theme, his second theme is "Blue Chipper" from WWE: Uncaged VIII and is on We Gotta Wrestle as a bonus track, while his third is on Volume 2;
- track 12 (Flash Funk - Can't Get Enough) does not have the Volume 2 version's starting quote; On "We Gotta Wrestle" Version it is a dance track
- track 13 (Sunny - "I Know You Want Me") does not feature the extra quotes of the Volume 2 version, the actual theme debuted at Survivor Series 1996 and was used on March 16. 1997
- track 14 (Shawn Michaels - "Bad Attitude") is a new song, used for advertising in 1997, the song debuted in October 1997 on WWF The Music, Volume 2

Tracks 1, 2, 4, 6, 7, 8 and 10 are the same as on WWF The Music, Volume 2.

=== Track listing ===
1. The Undertaker - "Darkside" (3:52)
2. Stone Cold Steve Austin - "Hell Frozen Over" (2:57)
3. Ahmed Johnson - "Pearl River Rip" (2:45)
4. Marc Mero & Sable - "Wild Cat" (2:51)
5. Jake "The Snake" Roberts - "Snake" (2:44)
6. Bret Hart - "You Start the Fire" (3:10)
7. Vader - "Mastodon" (3:09)
8. Mankind - "Ode to Freud" (3:02)
9. Faarooq - "Nation of Domination" (3:01)
10. Sycho Sid - "Snap" (3:18)
11. Rocky Maivia - "Destiny" (2:36)
12. Flash Funk - "Can't Get Enough" (3:20)
13. Sunny - "I Know You Want Me" (2:46)
14. Shawn Michaels - "Bad Attitude" (2:44)

== See also ==
- Music in professional wrestling
