= Piledriver: The Wrestling Album II =

Soundtrack album by World Wrestling Federation
- Released: September 21, 1987
- Recorded: 1987
- Studio: Platinum Island Recording Studio; The Hit Factory
- Genre: Pop rock; heavy metal; funk; country
- Label: Epic
- Producer: Jim Johnston; Rick Derringer; David Wolff

World Wrestling Federation chronology
The Wrestling Album (1985)	Piledriver: The Wrestling Album II (1987)	WrestleMania: The Album (1993)

Piledriver: The Wrestling Album II is the second soundtrack album released by the World Wrestling Federation (WWF). It was released on September 21, 1987, by Epic Records. It featured actual vocal performances from several of the wrestlers themselves.

The original vinyl LP release of Piledriver featured a head shot of Hulk Hogan wearing a construction hard hat on the front cover. It is the only WWF/WWE album to have not been released on CD. In addition to the album, a VHS videotape version was also issued in 1987 by Coliseum Video. This tape featured music videos for 8 of the songs from the album (the songs "Crank It Up" and "Waking Up Alone" did not have music videos made for them).

Several of the songs on the album would be used as entrance themes for the wrestlers. Strike Force used an instrumental version of "Girls in Cars" until their split in 1989, Koko B. Ware used "Piledriver" into 1990, Honky Tonk Man used his self-titled track for the majority of his career, "Demolition" was used for the team until late 1990, "Jive Soul Bro" was used as the theme of Slick and several of his wrestlers until 1990, and "Crank It Up" was used for the tag team of The Young Stallions (a storyline was created in which Jimmy Hart wanted to use the song for The Hart Foundation, but the Stallions "stole" it).

== Track listing ==
Side A
No.	Title	Writer(s)	Artist(s)	Length
1.	"Girls in Cars"	Jim Johnston	Robbie Dupree & Strike Force	3:34
2.	"Piledriver"	M. McDonnell; Johnston	Koko B. Ware	2:55
3.	"Honky Tonk Man"	J. J. MaGuire; Jimmy Hart	The Honky Tonk Man	2:09
4.	"Demolition"	Rick Derringer	Derringer	3:14
5.	"Jive Soul Bro"	J. Batter; V. Taylor; David Wolff	Slick	3:35

Side B
No.	Title	Writer(s)	Artist(s)	Length
1.	"Crank It Up"	MaGuire; Hart	Jimmy Hart	2:42
2.	"Waking Up Alone"	McDonnell; Johnston	Hillbilly Jim & Gertrude	2:59
3.	"Stand Back"	Johnston	Vince McMahon	3:02
4.	"Rock and Roll, Hoochie Koo"	Derringer	"Mean" Gene Okerlund & Derringer	3:40
5.	"If You Only Knew"	Johnston	The WWF Superstars	3:18

== Personnel ==
=== Production ===
- Executive Producer: David Wolff
- Producer: Rick Derringer
- Co-Producer: David Wolff
- Recorded and Mixed by: Tom Edmonds
- WWF Music Director: Jim Johnston
- Project Administrator: Laura Adler
- Art Director/Cover Design: Brian Penry
- Photographer: Stephen H. Taylor
- Illustration: Brian Penry, Tom Brenner
- Photo Studio: Chris Meech, Images IV
- Make-up: Amanda Wallingford
- Legal Affairs: Ed Kelman
- A&R Consultant: Michael Caplan
- Product Manager: John Doelp
- Assistant Engineers: Oz Fritz and Anita Sobelson
- Recorded at: Platinum Island Recording Studio (NYC), The Hit Factory (NYC)
- Mixed at: Platinum Island Recording Studio
- Special Thanks: Top Kat Studios (NYC), Dallas Sound Lab, Nicollet Sound (Minneapolis), The Metalworks Studios (Toronto), Vernie "Butch" Taylor (Guitar on "Jive Soul Bro"), Rosemary Mulligan

=== Musicians ===
- Drums: Bernard Kenny, Kevin Hupp, Chuck Bürgi, Robert Ford, Bobby Leonard
- Guitars: Rick Derringer, Vernie "Butch" Taylor
- Bass: Charlie Torres-Mass, Rick Derringer, Howard Cloud
- Keyboards: Vinnie Martucci, Rick Derringer, Paul Griffin, George Pavlis
- Horns: Joshua Schneider, Don Hahn, Richie Cannata, Marion Meadows, Steve Sechi
- Background Vocals: Elaine Goff, Amy Goff, Bernard Kenny, Rick Derringer, D.L. Byron, Randi Michaels, Cookie Watkins, Dennis Feldman, Robbie Dupree, Randy Rolin, Steve Johnstad, Vernie "Butch" Taylor, Jimmy Hart

== See also ==
- Music in professional wrestling
