= WWE Originals =

Soundtrack album by World Wrestling Entertainment
- Released: January 13, 2004
- Recorded: 2003
- Genre: Pop rock; rap rock
- Length: 50:55
- Label: Columbia
- Producer: Jim Johnston; Mike Post; John Cena; DJ Chaos

World Wrestling Entertainment chronology
WWE Anthology (2002)	WWE Originals (2004)	ThemeAddict: WWE The Music, Vol. 6 (2004)

WWE Originals is a soundtrack album by WWE. Released on January 13, 2004 by Columbia Records, it features original songs recorded by various WWE wrestlers. The album was a commercial success, reaching number 12 on the US Billboard 200.

== Composition ==
Music website AllMusic categorised WWE Originals as "contemporary pop/rock" and rap rock, with writer Johnny Loftus identifying styles such as "soft-focus piano pop", dance-pop and hip hop on the album. Slam! Wrestling's John Powell also identified the genres of electronic and power ballad on the collection, while Billboard magazine noted a dominance of "in-your-face rap".

== Release ==
WWE Originals was released by Columbia Records on January 13, 2004. Initial pressings of the album also featured a bonus DVD, which featured behind-the-scenes footage of the making of the album and more.

== Reception ==
=== Commercial ===
In the United States, WWE Originals reached number 12 on the Billboard 200.

=== Critical ===
Music website AllMusic awarded WWE Originals three out of five stars. Reviewer Johnny Loftus criticised tracks such as Stacy Keibler's "Why Can't We Just Dance?" and Kurt Angle's "I Don't Suck (Really)", identifying them as proof of some performers' musical inability. However, Loftus praised the "amusing" skits performed by Stone Cold Steve Austin, as well as a number of tracks including "I Just Want You" by Trish Stratus and "Put a Little A** on It" by Rikishi.

John Powell of Slam! Wrestling was more critical, describing the compositions on the album as "generic, cookie-cutter productions without any soul, character or style" and criticising the performances in general. In particular, Powell criticised songs such as The Dudley Boyz' "We've Had Enough", Trish Stratus' "I Just Want You", Lita's "When I Get You Alone" and Stacy Keibler's "Why Can't We Just Dance?"; however, he did praise the performances of John Cena and Lilian Garcia.

Michael Paoletta of Billboard magazine described WWE Originals as "mixed, very mixed". Paoletta noted a dominance of hip hop music on the album, claiming that the pop and rock songs were of higher quality, particularly those performed by divas Keibler, Stratus and Lita.

== Track listing ==
All tracks are written by James A. Johnston, except where noted.
All tracks are produced by Johnston, except "You Just Don't Know Me at All", produced by Mike Post, and "Basic Thuganomics", produced by John Cena and DJ Chaos.

No.	Title	Writer(s)	Artist	Length
1.	"Where's the Beer?" (segment 1)		Stone Cold Steve Austin	2:36
2.	"We've Had Enough"	Johnston (music/lyrics); Aaron Gaffney (lyrics)	The Dudley Boyz	3:06
3.	"I Just Want You"		Trish Stratus	3:35
4.	"Crossing Borders"	Johnston (music/lyrics); Aloe Blacc (lyrics)	Rey Mysterio	2:51
5.	"Did You Feel It?" (segment 2)		Stone Cold Steve Austin	2:00
6.	"Can You Dig It?"	Johnston (music/lyrics); Gaffney (lyrics)	Booker T	3:33
7.	"I Don't Suck (Really)"		Kurt Angle	3:05
8.	"When I Get You Alone"		Lita	3:27
9.	"You Changed the Lyrics" (segment 3)		Stone Cold Steve Austin	1:30
10.	"You Just Don't Know Me at All"	Lilian Garcia; Doug Kistner; Anthony Krizan	Lilian Garcia	4:08
11.	"We Lie, We Cheat, We Steal"	Johnston (music/lyrics); Blacc (lyrics)	Eddie and Chavo Guerrero	3:43
12.	"Don't You Wish You Were Me?"	Johnston; Chris Jericho; Rich Ward	Chris Jericho	3:31
13.	"Drink Your Beer" (segment 4)		Stone Cold Steve Austin	1:50
14.	"Put a Little A** on It"		Rikishi	4:44
15.	"Why Can't We Just Dance?"		Stacy Keibler	3:17
16.	"Basic Thuganomics"	John Cena; DJ Chaos	John Cena	3:14
17.	"Don't That Taste Good?" (segment 5)		Stone Cold Steve Austin	0:45
Total length:				50:55

Samples

- "Basic Thuganomics" contains a sample of "Two, Three, Break" by The B-Boys.

Bonus DVD contents
No.	Title	Length
1.	"Coach's Mission"
2.	"Trish's Studio Session"
3.	"Kurt Angle Mouths Off"
4.	"Rey Mysterio – Escuche!"
5.	"Stacy Keibler's Got the Moves"
6.	"The Dudley Boyz Have Had It"
7.	"Booker T's Studio Session"
8.	"Coach Shows Off His Musical Skills"
9.	"Lita Rocks"
10.	"Rikishi Lays Down a Track"
11.	"Stone Cold Sings?"
12.	"Eddie & Chavo Guerrero – They Lie, Cheat, Steal & Sing!"
13.	"Chris Jericho Gets Vocal"
14.	"Coach Meets Jim Johnston"

== See also ==
- Music in professional wrestling
