= WWF Aggression =

Soundtrack album by World Wrestling Federation
- Released: March 21, 2000
- Genre: Hip hop, Hardcore hip hop, Rap rock
- Length: 47:19
- Label: Priority
- Producer: Jim Johnston (exec.); Vince McMahon (exec.); Howard Sadowsky (exec.); Mark Copeland (exec.); Binky; Greg Danylyshyn; Rashad Coes; Jam Master Jay; Kool Keith; Rockwilder; R.A. the Rugged Man; Mark "Boogie" Brown; Dame Grease

World Wrestling Federation chronology
WWF The Music, Volume 4 (1999)	WWF Aggression (2000)	WWF The Music, Vol. 5 (2001)

WWF Aggression is a soundtrack album by WWE (then known as the World Wrestling Federation, or WWF). Released on March 21, 2000, by Priority Records, it features entrance music of WWE wrestlers re-recorded by various hip hop artists and groups. The album was a commercial success, charting at number eight on the US Billboard 200.

== Composition ==
Stephen Thomas Erlewine of music website AllMusic categorised WWF Aggression in hip hop genres such as hardcore hip hop and gangsta rap, describing it as "straight-ahead hardcore rap, targeted at WWF's audience." Six of the album's 13 tracks were produced by Binky of West Coast hip hop duo Allfrumtha I, with other producers including Jam Master Jay and Rockwilder.

== Reception ==
=== Commercial ===
WWF Aggression was a commercial success. In the US, the album reached number eight on the US Billboard 200 and number ten on the Top R&B/Hip-Hop Albums chart; in Canada, it reached number six on the Canadian Albums Chart. It was certified gold by the Recording Industry Association of America, indicating sales of over 500,000 units, and was also certified gold by Music Canada and silver by the British Phonographic Industry.

=== Critical ===
Music website AllMusic awarded the album three out of five stars. Writer Stephen Thomas Erlewine proposed that "since [the album] is targeted at [WWF's] male adolescent audience, it's just thuggish without being particularly inventive." He highlighted the track "Wreck" by Kool Keith and Ol' Dirty Bastard, but also claimed that it "doesn't really live up to expectations." Describing the material as "blunt hip-hop that isn't as brutal as it appears," Erlewine concluded that the album "will only be of interest to wrestling fans, not to hip-hop fanatics."

== Track listing ==
No.	Title	Subject(s)	Length
1.	"The Kings" (performed by Run–D.M.C.)	D-Generation X, McMahon-Helmsley Faction	3:50
2.	"Wreck" (performed by Kool Keith and Ol' Dirty Bastard)	Mankind	3:11
3.	"Know Your Role" (performed by Method Man)	The Rock	3:15
4.	"Hell Yeah" (performed by Snoop Dogg and WC)	Stone Cold Steve Austin	3:37
5.	"No Chance" (performed by Redman and Rock featuring Peanut Butter Wolf)	Vince McMahon	4:16
6.	"I Won't Stop" (performed by C-Murder featuring Magic)	Gangrel	3:15
7.	"Big Red Machine" (performed by Tha Eastsidaz)	Kane	3:59
8.	"Break Down the Walls" (performed by R.A. the Rugged Man)	Chris Jericho	3:44
9.	"You Ain't Hard" (performed by Bad Azz and Techniec)	The New Age Outlaws	3:41
10.	"Pimpin' Ain't Easy" (performed by Ice-T)	The Godfather	3:11
11.	"Game" (performed by Mystikal and Ras Kass)	Triple H	3:58
12.	"Big" (performed by Mack 10, K Mac and Boo Kapone featuring MC Eiht)	Big Show	3:54
13.	"Ministry" (performed by Dame Grease presents Meeno)	The Undertaker	3:28

== Personnel ==
- Binky – production (tracks 4–6, 8, 9, 11 and 12)
- Greg Danylyshyn – production (tracks 1, 2 and 7)
- Rashad Coes – co-production (tracks 1, 7)
- Jam Master Jay – production (track 1)
- Kool Keith – production (track 2)
- Rockwilder – production (track 3)
- R.A. the Rugged Man – co-production (track 8)
- Mark "Boogie" Brown – production (track 10)
- Dame Grease – production (track 13)

== Charts ==
=== Weekly charts ===
Chart (2000)	Peak position
Canadian Albums (Billboard)	6
US Billboard 200	8
US Top R&B/Hip-Hop Albums (Billboard)	10

=== Year-end charts ===
Year-end chart performance for WWF Aggression
Chart (2000)	Position
Canadian Albums (Nielsen SoundScan)	184
US Billboard 200	163

== Certifications ==
Region	Certification	Sales/shipments
Canada (MC)	Gold	50,000^{^}
United Kingdom (BPI)	Silver	60,000^{^}
United States (RIAA)	Gold	500,000^{^}
^{^}shipments figures based on certification alone

== See also ==
- Music in professional wrestling
