= Mercy Drive =

American rock band

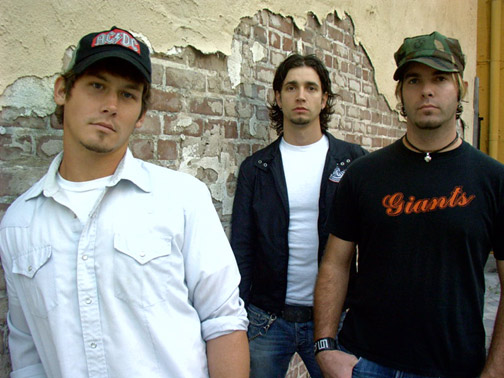
- Jimmy McGlothlin, Corey Lane, and Jake Beard of Mercy Drive

Background information
- Also known as: Big Mother Thruster (2000-present)
- Origin: Orlando, Florida, US
- Genres: Hard rock, post-grunge, alternative metal, nu metal
- Years active: 2000–2008, 2014–present
- Labels: Unsigned
- Members: Jimmy McGlothlin; Jake Beard; Corey Lane

Mercy Drive is an American hard rock band originally based out of Central Florida, best known for writing and performing entrance themes for WWE, most notably Maven Huffman (Tattoo) and Randy Orton (Burn In My Light).

== History ==
Mercy Drive originates from the band Big Mother Thruster, founded by Corey Lane and Josh Lyons. Jimmy McGlothin joined the band after meeting Corey in a mosh pit during a Hard Rock Live show in the summer of 2000. Big Mother Thruster was a moderate success. Their momentum increased when they played the Florida circuit. They also gained recognition through supporting other acts including Drowning Pool, Adema and Staind.

In 2001, Big Mother Thruster gained bigger exposure through working with WWE (then World Wrestling Federation) and MTV. Four of their songs were used on Tough Enough, a reality show produced by WWE which aired on MTV. The soundtrack to the series went on to sell over 150,000 copies nationwide. WWE would also enlist the help of Big Mother Thruster to produce a song for the series' eventual winner, Maven Huffman. Maven went on to use "Tattoo" as his entrance theme for the entirety of his time in WWE (2001–2005).

After parting ways with Josh Lyons and Mark James, the band reorganized and changed its name to 'Mercy Drive'. Jimmy McGlothlin (vocals), Jake Beard (guitar), and Corey Lane (drums) recorded at Tree Studios in Atlanta with producer Rick Beato. Stan Martell (bass guitar) was later added to the lineup. When Mercy Drive returned under their new name, they rerecorded Tattoo with new lyrics. The song was renamed "Memory". However, the new version of the song was never used as an entrance theme for Maven, as he was released from WWE just days before the song could make its way to television.

When Randy Orton won the World Heavyweight Championship in 2004, Mercy Drive's song "Away" was used in a promotional video showcasing Orton's accomplishments from his debut to his World Championship victory. Following Orton's departure from Evolution, he began to use Mercy Drive's "Burn in My Light" as his entrance theme. The song made its debut on WWE RAW a week after Orton spit in Triple H's face after refusing to hand over his newly won World Heavyweight Championship. The track was included on WWE's Wreckless Intent in 2006.

Mercy Drive teamed up with producer Rick Beato (Shinedown, Vince Neil, Flickerstick, Working Title) to put together an "in-your-face" blend of Modern Rock that complemented the band's dynamic live performances. Maverick Records dropped them prior to the album's release. As a result, their self-titled debut record was available exclusively through the band's official website.

== Band members ==
Current

- Corey Lane – drums (2000–present)
- Jake Beard – guitar (2000–present)
- Jimmy McGlothlin – guitar, vocals (2000–present)
- Gordon Madison – guitar (2021–present)

Past

- Josh Lyons – vocals (2000–2004)
- Mark James – bass (2000–2004)
- Stan Martell – bass (2004–2008)

== Discography ==
Mercy Drive

Studio album by Mercy Drive
- Released: 2005
- Genre: Hard rock Alternative Metal; Rock; Nu Metal
- Label: Independent, Self-released

Mercy Drive's self-titled album, produced by Rick Beato, was never released by Maverick Records.

=== Track listing ===
All tracks are written by Mercy Drive.

No.	Title	Length
1.	"Away"	4:17
2.	"Dead Horse"	3:06
3.	"See You Crawl"	3:15
4.	"Promise"	4:08
5.	"Deja Vu"	3:17
6.	"Mindset"	2:54
7.	"Lost Inside"	3:51
8.	"Pressed"	5:05
9.	"Over"	2:58
10.	"Memory"	4:15
11.	"Follow"	2:54
12.	"I'll Be Late"	3:53
