= WrestleMania: The Album =

Soundtrack album by World Wrestling Federation
- Released: 1993
- Recorded: 1992
- Studio: PWL Studios, London, England
- Genre: Pop; rock; new jack swing; spoken word
- Label: Arista; RCA
- Producer: Simon Cowell; Mike Stock; Pete Waterman; Dave Ford; Gary Miller

World Wrestling Federation chronology
Piledriver: The Wrestling Album II (1987)	WrestleMania: The Album (1993)	WWF Full Metal: The Album (1995)

Professional ratings
Review scores
Source	Rating
AllMusic	2.5/5 stars

WrestleMania: The Album is the third studio album by the World Wrestling Federation (WWF). It was released in 1993 by Arista Records and RCA Records.

Mike Stock and Pete Waterman (of Britain's famed Stock Aitken Waterman songwriting team) oversaw the project as producers and co-composers for RCA Records, with British A&R executive Simon Cowell serving as the executive producer.

Cowell conceived the project after learning that the WWF wrestlers had sold out Wembley Stadium in 27 minutes for SummerSlam 1992. Senior executives and A&R staff at Arista begged Cowell not to proceed with the project, fearing it would bring the label into disrepute.

The album failed to chart on the US Billboard 200 but reached #10 in the UK. The single "Slam Jam" was certified silver by the British Phonographic Industry in the United Kingdom and reached number four in the UK charts in December 1992.

== Track listing ==
All tracks are written by Mike Stock and Pete Waterman, except where noted.

UK release
No.	Title	Writer(s)	Artist(s)	Length
1.	"WrestleMania ^{1}"		World Wrestling Federation Superstars
2.	"Slam Jam"		World Wrestling Federation Superstars
3.	"USA"	Dave Ford; Stock; Waterman	"Hacksaw" Jim Duggan
4.	"Nasty Boy Stomp ^{2}"		The Nasty Boys
5.	"Never Been a Right Time to Say Goodbye"		Bret "Hitman" Hart
6.	"The Man In Black"	Gary Miller; Stock; Waterman	The Undertaker
7.	"Speaking from the Heart ^{3}"	Asha Elfenbein; Tony King; Stock; Waterman	"Macho Man" Randy Savage
8.	"Tatanka Native American"	Ford; Stock; Waterman	Tatanka
9.	"I'm Perfect"	Ford	Mr. Perfect
10.	"Cold Crush"	Waterman	Crush
11.	"Hard Times"		The Big Boss Man
12.	"Slam Jam" (12" Full Nelson Mix)		World Wrestling Federation Superstars

U.S. release
No.	Title	Writer(s)	Artist(s)	Length
1.	"WrestleMania ^{1}"		World Wrestling Federation Superstars
2.	"Slam Jam"		World Wrestling Federation Superstars
3.	"USA"	Ford; Stock; Waterman	"Hacksaw" Jim Duggan
4.	"Nasty Boy Stomp ^{2}"		The Nasty Boys
5.	"Never Been a Right Time to Say Goodbye"		Bret "Hitman" Hart
6.	"The Man In Black"	Miller; Stock; Waterman	The Undertaker
7.	"Speaking from the Heart ^{3}"	Elfenbein; King; Stock; Waterman	"Macho Man" Randy Savage
8.	"Tatanka Native American"	Ford; Stock; Waterman	Tatanka
9.	"I'm Perfect"	Ford	Mr. Perfect
10.	"Hard Times"		The Big Boss Man

=== Notes ===
1. An instrumental version of "WrestleMania" was used as the theme song for WrestleManias X (1994) through XIV (1998). It was also later used as Linda McMahon's entrance music.
2. Samples the percussion and a very similar bass beat from "Visions of China" by Japan, as well as "Nasty" by Janet Jackson.
3. Incorporates elements from the wrestler's entrance music.

=== Singles ===
- "Slam Jam" (credited to WWF Superstars)
  - Released: 1992
  - UK singles chart: #4
  - Certified silver by the British Phonographic Industry in the UK.
- "WrestleMania" (credited to World Wrestling Federation Superstars)
  - Released: 1993
  - UK singles chart: #14
- "USA" (credited to World Wrestling Federation Superstars featuring "Hacksaw" Jim Duggan)
  - Released: 1993
  - UK singles chart: #71

== See also ==
- Music in professional wrestling
