= WWE The Music, Volume 7 =

WWE The Music, Vol. 7

Compilation album by World Wrestling Entertainment
- Released: March 16, 2007 [iTunes Only]
- Genre: Rock/hip hop
- Length: 70:38
- Label: World Wrestling Entertainment
- Producer: Jim Johnston

World Wrestling Entertainment chronology
WWE Wreckless Intent (2006)	WWE The Music, Vol. 7 (2007)	Raw Greatest Hits: The Music (2007)

The Music - WWE - Volume 7 is a compilation album released by WWE. Unlike past WWE albums, this was released as a U.S. iTunes Store exclusive, although was eventually added to the UK and Canada iTunes music stores. It contains 21 tracks representing many genres of music. It is not available at any other online retailer or any walk-in store.

== Track listing ==
Track	Song	Artist	Superstar(s)	Length
1	"Light a Fire"	Bryan Seeley	Ashley	4:14
2	"Bringin' Da Hood T U"	Lordikim Allah 'Boogie'	Cryme Tyme/JTG	3:45
3	"Don't Waste My Time"		Elijah Burke	3:25
4	"Unglued"		Snitsky	3:10
5	"Lambeg"		Finlay	3:31
6	"Reality"	Jimi Bell	The Miz	3:17
7	"Teacher"		Matt Striker	3:11
8	"Muy Loco"	Kemo the Blaxican	Super Crazy	3:32
9	"Gorse"		The Highlanders	2:31
10	"Not Enough for Me"		Michelle McCool	3:25
11	"Just Look At Me"	Phillip Namanworth	Rob Conway	3:32
12	"da.ngar"		The Great Khali	2:58
13	"Gonna Punch Someone Tonight"	David Church	Jimmy Wang Yang	3:46
14	"All for the Motherland"		Vladimir Kozlov	4:00
15	"The End"	Eamon Cronin	Armageddon	3:51
16	"I'm All About Cool"		Deuce 'n Domino	2:49
17	"It's Time"*		Gregory Helms	2:21
18	"Unstoppable"*		Bobby Lashley	3:47
19	"Obsession"		Mickie James	3:22
20	"Smooth"*		Marcus Cor Von	3:21
21	"Damn"*		Ron Simmons	3:00

Starred tracks are not available as a separate download, and must be purchased as part of the album, Track 3 "Don't Waste My Time," had an alternate name as of April 1 it was called "New Breed."

== See also ==
- Music in professional wrestling
