= WWE Anthology =

Compilation album by World Wrestling Entertainment
- Released: November 12, 2002
- Genre: Hard rock; heavy metal
- Length: 3:29:41
- Label: Koch
- Producer: Jim Johnston

World Wrestling Entertainment chronology
WWF Forceable Entry (2002)	WWE Anthology (2002)	WWE Originals (2004)

WWE Anthology is a compilation album by World Wrestling Entertainment. Released on November 12, 2002 by Koch Records, it features entrance theme music of various WWE wrestlers and events. The album is the first on which the company is named World Wrestling Entertainment (WWE), after it was renamed from the World Wrestling Federation (WWF) in May 2002. The album was a commercial success, charting at number 13 on the US Billboard 200.

== Composition ==
The three-disc WWE Anthology was categorised by music website AllMusic in the genres of hard rock and heavy metal. The album features entrance theme music of various WWE wrestlers from different eras of the company's history up until the album's release, including "The Federation Years" (such as Hulk Hogan's "Real American", Bret Hart's "Hitman" and Shawn Michaels's "Sexy Boy"), "The Attitude Era" (such as D-Generation X's "Break It Down", The Rock's "If You Smell..." and Stone Cold Steve Austin's "I Won't Do What You Tell Me") and the modern era.

== Release ==
WWE Anthology was released on November 12, 2002 by Koch Records in association with SmackDown! Records, a division of WWE. Announcing the album, a WWE press release described the album as a "collection featuring the greatest hits, past and present, of WWE Superstar Entrance and Event themes", all but 38 of the featured tracks had never been previously released.

== Reception ==
=== Commercial ===
WWE Anthology was a commercial success. In the US, the album reached number 13 on the US Billboard 200, as well as topping the Independent Albums chart and reaching number two on the Top Soundtracks chart. It was certified platinum by the Recording Industry Association of America, indicating sales of over 1 million units, in only ten days of its release. The album was also certified silver by the British Phonographic Industry in the United Kingdom.

=== Critical ===
Music website AllMusic awarded WWE Anthology four out of five stars. Reviewer Bradley Torreano praised the album for its comprehensive nature, noting that "for completists this is the premier collection of WWF/WWE music up to this point, bar none". Torreano hailed the second disc (titled "The Attitude Era") as the highlight, but condemned the third disc (titled "NOW!") as documenting "the fall of the company", describing the music as "mostly boring".

== Track listing ==
All songs written and performed by Jim Johnston, except where noted.

Disc one: "The Federation Years"
No.	Title	Subject(s)	Length
1.	"World Wrestling Federation Signature"	World Wrestling Federation	0:08
2.	"Real American" (written by Rick Derringer and Kenny Bernhard)	Hulk Hogan	2:57
3.	"Hitman" (written by Jimmy Hart and J.J. Maguire)	Bret Hart	2:00
4.	"Walkabout"	The Bushwackers	2:01
5.	"Together" (written by Johnston, Hart and Maguire)	Macho Man Randy Savage and Miss Elizabeth's wedding	3:31
6.	"It's All About the Money" (written by Hart and Maguire)	"The Million Dollar Man" Ted DiBiase	1:47
7.	"Snake Bit"	Jake "The Snake" Roberts	2:08
8.	"Bad Boy"	Razor Ramon	1:58
9.	"No Holds Barred"	No Holds Barred	3:42
10.	"Unstable"	Ultimate Warrior	1:43
11.	"I Love You"	Brother Love	2:01
12.	"Cool Cocky Bad" (written by Hart)	The Honky Tonk Man	2:09
13.	"One Two Three"	1-2-3 Kid	1:38
14.	"Sweet Lovin' Arms"	Bertha Faye	3:11
15.	"Can't Get Enough"	Flash Funk	2:01
16.	"I Know You Want Me"	Sunny	2:03
17.	"I'll Be Your Hero"	Lex Express	4:29
18.	"Sexy Boy" (written by Hart and Maguire)	Shawn Michaels	2:49
19.	"Los Boricuas"	Los Boricuas	1:57
20.	"Schizophrenic"	Mankind	1:44
21.	"Smokin'"	The Smoking Gunns	2:16
22.	"Sumo"	Yokozuna	2:08
23.	"Snapped"	Sycho Sid	2:05
24.	"Tell Me a Lie"	Shawn Michaels's "farewell"	3:02
25.	"Enough Is Enough"	Owen Hart	2:02
26.	"With My Baby Tonight"	Road Dogg	3:49
27.	"Wild Cat"	Sable	1:57
28.	"You Start the Fire"	Bret Hart tribute	3:08
29.	"Diesel Blues"	Diesel	2:20
30.	"Dude's Shack"	Dude Love	2:20
31.	"Power"	Nation of Domination	1:37
32.	"Corporate Ministry"	The Corporate Ministry	3:55
33.	"The Dudester"	Dude Love	1:53
Total length:			78:31

Disc two: "The Attitude Era"
No.	Title	Subject(s)	Length
1.	"Attitude Signature"	WWE	0:13
2.	"Break It Down" (featuring The Chris Warren Band)	D-Generation X	2:13
3.	"I Won't Do What You Tell Me"	Stone Cold Steve Austin	3:02
4.	"Ass Man"	Billy Gunn	2:27
5.	"Brawl for All"	Brawl for All	1:15
6.	"Gold-Lust"	Goldust	2:35
7.	"California"	WrestleMania 2000	2:22
8.	"Who I Am"	Chyna	1:57
9.	"The Real Deal"	D'Lo Brown	2:00
10.	"Deadly Game"	Survivor Series (1998)	3:33
11.	"The Ultimate"	Ken Shamrock	2:14
12.	"You Think You Know Me"	Edge	2:23
13.	"Blood"	Gangrel	2:06
14.	"The Ho Train"	The Godfather	2:23
15.	"Fist"	DX with Mike Tyson	2:22
16.	"Oh You Didn't Know?"	The New Age Outlaws	2:06
17.	"Burned"	Kane	2:33
18.	"Hello Ladies"	Val Venis	2:27
19.	"Real Man's Man"	William Regal	1:30
20.	"I Don't Suck"	Kurt Angle	2:22
21.	"Latino Heat"	Eddie Guerrero	1:46
22.	"It Just Feels Right"	Lita	1:46
23.	"Sexual Chocolate"	Mark Henry	2:29
24.	"No Chance in Hell"	Mr. McMahon	1:59
25.	"Oh Hell Yeah" (featuring H-Blockx)	Stone Cold Steve Austin	2:14
26.	"If You Smell..."	The Rock	2:55
27.	"Bad Man"	Rikishi	2:05
28.	"Bangin' It"	Scotty 2 Hotty	2:07
29.	"13"	Tazz	2:17
30.	"We're Comin' Down"	The Dudley Boyz	2:35
31.	"My Time" (featuring The Chris Warren Band)	Triple H	3:05
32.	"Rabid"	Chris Benoit	1:58
33.	"How Do You Like Me Now?"	Hardcore Holly	1:57
34.	"Dark Side"	The Undertaker	3:47
35.	"Break Down the Walls"	Chris Jericho	2:03
Total length:			79:07

Disc three: "NOW!"
No.	Title	Subject(s)	Length
1.	"WWE Signature"	WWE	0:19
2.	"Next Big Thing"	Brock Lesnar	2:33
3.	"Dead Man"	The Undertaker	3:11
4.	"At Last"	Christian	3:05
5.	"I'm Back"	Eric Bischoff	3:21
6.	"Eyes of Righteousness"	Reverend D-Von	3:39
7.	"Fight"	SummerSlam 2002	3:14
8.	"(619)"	Rey Mysterio	2:51
9.	"Time to Rock & Roll" (featuring Lil' Kim)	Trish Stratus	3:19
10.	"Eye of the Hurricane"	The Hurricane	2:51
11.	"King of My World" (written by and featuring Saliva)	Chris Jericho	3:57
12.	"All Grown Up"	Stephanie McMahon	2:56
13.	"Need a Little Time"	Torrie Wilson	3:11
14.	"The Game"	Triple H (an unused rap-style lyrical version of his 2000 "My Time" instrumental mix)	3:06
15.	"You're Gonna Pay"	The Undertaker	3:19
16.	"You Look So Good to Me"	Billy & Chuck	2:53
17.	"The End"	Armageddon	1:38
18.	"Here Comes the Money" (featuring Naughty by Nature)	Shane McMahon	2:51
Total length:			52:13

Bonus free download track
No.	Title	Length
1.	"Billy Kidman"	1:45

=== Notes ===
- "Deadly Game", featured in the "Attitude Era" section, is labeled as the theme of In Your House, when it was actually the theme of the 1998 Survivor Series pay-per-view.
- "The End", featured in the "NOW!" section, is incorrectly noted as being the theme from Judgment Day, when it is in fact from the Armageddon pay-per-view.
- "The Game", featured in the "NOW!" section, is labeled as Triple H's theme, when it is actually a rap-style lyrical, unused version of Triple H's 2000 "My Time" instrumental mix (the version used by Triple H was subsequently released in 2020 on the Uncaged XIV digital release under the title "Game Time").
- "Brawl for All", featured in the "Attitude Era" section, is labeled as the theme for WWF Brawl for All, when it was actually eventually used for the first incarnation of the XFL. The actual theme song for Brawl for All would eventually be released on WWE: Uncaged VII.
- Upon purchase of the album, buyers were provided with a code which, when entered on the website promoting the album, would allow download of a bonus track, titled "Billy Kidman". That track would later be released on ThemeAddict: WWE The Music, Vol. 6 under the title "You Can Run".

== Personnel ==
- Rick Derringer – vocals ("Real American")
- Jimmy Hart – vocals ("Sexy Boy")
- John Joyce – vocals ("No Holds Barred")
- The Honky Tonk Man – vocals ("Cool Cocky Bad")
- Maydie Myles – vocals ("Can't Get Enough" and "Eyes of Righteousness")
- Sunny – vocals ("I Know You Want Me")
- Fonda Feingold – vocals ("I Know You Want Me", "Tell Me a Lie" and "Who I Am", Together)
- Shawn Michaels – vocals ("Sexy Boy")
- Sycho Sid – vocals ("Snapped")
- Owen Hart – vocals ("Enough Is Enough")
- Road Dogg – vocals ("With My Baby Tonight")
- Peter Bursuker – vocals ("Corporate Ministry" and "No Chance in Hell")
- Earl Valentine – vocals ("Ass Man")
- Ike Dirty – vocals ("California" and "Bad Man")
- Prince Michael – vocals ("Fist")
- Val Venis – vocals ("Hello Ladies")
- Steve Sechi – horns ("Latino Heat")
- Stevan Swann – vocals ("Sexual Chocolate", Together)
- The Rock – vocals ("If You Smell...")
- Hardcore Holly – vocals ("How Do You Like Me Now?")
- Adam Morenoff – vocals ("Break Down the Walls")
- Donato Paternostro – drums ("Dead Man")
- Jimmy Kunes – vocals ("I'm Back")
- Eamon Cronin – vocals ("Fight" and "The End")
- Chris Classic – vocals ("(619)")
- Jacki-O – vocals ("All Grown Up")
- Lilian Garcia – vocals ("Need a Little Time")
- Michael Fredo – vocals ("You Look So Good to Me")
- Lordikim Allah – vocals ("Billy Kidman")

== Charts ==
=== Weekly charts ===
Weekly chart performance for WWE Anthology
Chart (2002)	Peak position
US Billboard 200	13
US Independent Albums (Billboard)	1
US Top Soundtracks (Billboard)	2

=== Year-end charts ===
Year-end chart performance for WWE Anthology
Chart (2002)	Position
Canadian Metal Albums (Nielsen SoundScan)	54

== Certifications ==
Region	Certification	Sales/shipments
United Kingdom (BPI)	Silver	60,000^{^}
United States (RIAA)	Platinum	1,000,000^{^}
^{^}shipments figures based on certification alone

== See also ==
- Music in professional wrestling
