= WWF Forceable Entry =

2002 soundtrack album by WWE

Soundtrack album by World Wrestling Federation
- Released: March 26, 2002
- Genres: Nu metal; alternative metal; industrial metal; rap metal; heavy metal; post-grunge; alternative rock; hard rock
- Length: 71:25
- Labels: Columbia; Smackdown! Records
- Producers: Jim Johnston (also exec.); Jay Baumgardner; Kid Rock; John Kurzweg; Eric Thorngren; Limp Bizkit; Terry Date; Josh Abraham; Scott Weiland; Raine Maida; Rob Zombie; Scott Humphrey; Justin Rimer; Matt Martone; Trent Reznor; Dave Ogilvie; Bryan Scott; Ben Grosse; Bob Marlette; Dave Wyndorf; Stereomud; Doug Kaye; Audio Hustlerz; Edsel Dope; Jim Wirt

World Wrestling Federation chronology
WWF The Music, Vol. 5 (2001)	WWF Forceable Entry (2002)	WWE Anthology (2002)

WWF Forceable Entry is a soundtrack album by the World Wrestling Federation (WWF, now known as World Wrestling Entertainment or WWE). Released on March 26, 2002 by Columbia Records, it features entrance music of WWE wrestlers re-recorded by various hard rock and heavy metal artists and bands. The album was a commercial success, charting at number three on the US Billboard 200.

It is also the last album released under the "WWF" name, as the company changed its name to "WWE" in May 2002 after a British court ruled in favor of the World Wide Fund for Nature in the WWF trademark dispute.

== Composition ==
Johnny Loftus of music website AllMusic categorized WWF Forceable Entry as alternative metal, post-grunge and rap metal. The album features a number of cover versions (including Kid Rock's cover of "Legs" by ZZ Top) and remixes (such as Limp Bizkit's "Rollin'" and Marilyn Manson's "The Beautiful People"), as well as new tracks. Some tracks are also new recordings of wrestlers' entrance themes, including Drowning Pool's cover of Motörhead's "The Game" (Triple H) and Disturbed's recording "Glass Shatters" (Stone Cold Steve Austin).

== Track listing ==
No.	Title	Writer(s)	Subject(s)	Length
1.	"The Game" (performed by Drowning Pool)	Jim Johnston; Lemmy Kilmister	Triple H	3:28
2.	"Legs" (performed by Kid Rock)	Billy Gibbons; Dusty Hill; Frank Beard	Stacy Keibler	4:53
3.	"Young Grow Old" (performed by Creed)	Scott Stapp; Mark Tremonti	Backlash 2002	4:43
4.	"Glass Shatters" (performed by Disturbed)	Johnston; David Draiman; Dan Donegan; Steve Kmak; Mike Wengren	Stone Cold Steve Austin	3:54
5.	"Rollin'" (Dead Man mix, performed by Limp Bizkit)	Fred Durst; Wes Borland; Sam Rivers; John Otto	The Undertaker	3:33
6.	"Whatever" (performed by Our Lady Peace)	Johnston; Raine Maida; Mike Turner; Duncan Coutts; Jeremy Taggart	Chris Benoit	3:53
7.	"Never Gonna Stop" (the Black Cat Crossing mix, performed by Rob Zombie)	Zombie; Scott Humphrey	Edge	3:40
8.	"One of a Kind" (performed by Breaking Point)	Brett Erickson; Justin Rimer	Rob Van Dam	3:28
9.	"The Beautiful People" (the WWF remix, performed by Marilyn Manson)	Marilyn Manson; Twiggy Ramirez	SmackDown!	4:16
10.	"Across the Nation" (performed by The Union Underground)	Johnston; Bryan Scott; Patrick Kennison	Raw	3:00
11.	"Break the Walls Down" (performed by Sevendust)	Johnston	Chris Jericho	3:16
12.	"Turn the Tables" (performed by Saliva)	Johnston	The Dudley Boyz	4:21
13.	"Live for the Moment" (performed by Monster Magnet)	Johnston; Dave Wyndorf	Matt Hardy	4:59
14.	"End of Everything" (performed by Stereomud)	Johnston; Erik Rogers; Corey Lowery; Joey Zampella; John Fattoruso; Dan Richardson	Raven	3:27
15.	"Ride of Your Life" (performed by Neurotica)	Kelly Schaefer; Miguel Przybyl; Doug Kaye	King of the Ring 2002	3:38
16.	"Just Another Victim" (performed by Cypress Hill)	Louis Freese; Senen Reyes; Eric Correa; Rogelio Lozano	Tazz	4:14
17.	"No Chance" (performed by Dope)	Johnston; Edsel Dope	Vince McMahon	4:01
18.	"Lovefurypassionenergy" (performed by Boy Hits Car)	Johnston; Cregg Rondell; Louis Lenard; Scott Menville; Michael Ferrari	Lita	4:41
19.	"Slow Chemical" (performed by Finger Eleven)	Johnston; James Black; Rick Jackett; Scott Anderson; Rich Beddoe; Sean Anderson	Kane	3:12

Note: Track 19 only appears on the Canadian release of the album.

== Personnel ==
- Jim Johnston – executive production, remix (track 9), mixing (track 15)
- Jay Baumgardner – production (track 1), mixing (tracks 1 and 10)
- James Murray – engineering (track 1)
- Kid Rock – production and mixing (track 2)
- Al Sutton – engineering (track 2)
- John Kurzweg – production, engineering and mixing (track 3)
- Eric Thorngren – production, recording and mixing (track 4)
- Terry Date – production and recording (track 5)
- Limp Bizkit – production (track 5)
- Josh Abraham – additional production (track 5)
- Scott Weiland – additional production (track 5)
- Andy Wallace – mixing (track 5)
- Raine Maida – production (track 6)
- Adam Kasper – mixing (track 6)
- Rob Zombie – production (track 7)
- Scott Humphrey – production and programming (track 7)
- Frank Gryner – engineering (track 7)
- The Old Dark House – mixing (track 7)
- Matt Martone – production and engineering (track 8)
- Justin Rimer – production (track 8)
- Jack Joseph Puig – mixing (tracks 8 and 18)
- Trent Reznor – production (track 9)
- Dave Ogilvie – production (track 9)
- Bryan Scott – production (track 10)
- Jeremy Parker – engineering (track 10)
- Ben Grosse – production and mixing (track 11)
- Adam Barber – engineering (track 11)
- Blumpy – engineering (track 11)
- Bob Marlette – production, engineering, mixing and programming (track 12)
- Sid Riggs – programming (track 12)
- Dave Wyndorf – production (track 13)
- John Shyloski – engineering (track 13)
- John Travis – mixing (track 13)
- Cyrille Taillandier – programming (track 13)
- Stereomud – production (track 14)
- Big Red – engineering and mixing (track 14)
- Doug Kaye – production and engineering (track 15)
- Rick Duncan – engineering (track 15)
- Audio Hustlerz – production and arrangements (track 16)
- Troy Staton – mixing (track 16)
- Edsel Dope – production and engineering (track 17)
- Warren Dyker – mixing (track 17)
- Jim Wirt – production and engineering (track 18)
- Matt Pinfield – liner notes

== Charts ==
=== Weekly charts ===
Weekly chart performance for WWF Forceable Entry
Chart (2002)	Peak position
Canadian Albums (Billboard)	3
US Billboard 200	3

=== Year-end charts ===
Year-end chart performance for WWF Forceable Entry
Chart (2002)	Position
Canadian Albums (Nielsen SoundScan)	144
Canadian Alternative Albums (Nielsen SoundScan)	47
Canadian Metal Albums (Nielsen SoundScan)	24
US Billboard 200	189

== Certifications ==
Certifications for WWF Forceable Entry
Region	Certification	Certified units/sales
United States (RIAA)	Gold	500,000^{^}
^{^} Shipments figures based on certification alone.

== Release ==
WWF Forceable Entry was released on March 26, 2002 by Columbia Records in association with SmackDown! Records, a division of WWE.

== Reception ==
=== Commercial ===
WWF Forceable Entry was a commercial success. In the US, the album reached number three on the US Billboard 200; in Canada, it reached number three on the Canadian Albums Chart. It was certified gold by the Recording Industry Association of America, indicating sales of over 500,000 units. The album sold over 145,000 copies in the US in its first week on sale.

=== Critical ===
Music website AllMusic awarded the album two out of five stars. Writer Johnny Loftus noted that Forceable Entry "will be most relevant to wrestling fans," but joked that "fans of heavy music...might seek this set out in the local sale bin."

== See also ==
- Music in professional wrestling
