= WWF The Music, Vol. 5 =

- Cover art featuring The Rock

Soundtrack album by World Wrestling Federation
- Released: February 20, 2001
- Genre: Soundtrack
- Length: 46:44
- Label: Koch
- Producer: Jim Johnston

World Wrestling Federation chronology
WWF Aggression (2000)	WWF The Music, Vol. 5 (2001)	WWF Forceable Entry (2002)

WWF The Music, Vol. 5 is a soundtrack album by WWE (then known as the World Wrestling Federation, or WWF). Released on February 20, 2001, by Koch Records (now eOne Records), it features entrance theme music of various WWE superstars, all of which were composed and performed by Jim Johnston (with the exception of one song, performed by Motörhead). The album was a commercial success, charting at number two on the US Billboard 200.

== Composition ==
All songs on WWF The Music, Vol. 5 were written, composed and performed by WWE composer Jim Johnston, with the exception of "The Game" which was performed by English heavy metal band Motörhead, and "Pie" which features rapper Slick Rick. Music website AllMusic categorised the album as heavy metal, hard rock and alternative metal, while a review on Slam! Wrestling also identified the gospel style on "Pie".

== Reception ==
=== Commercial ===
WWF The Music, Vol. 5 was a commercial success. In the US, the album reached number two on the US Billboard 200 and topped the Independent Albums chart; in Canada, it reached number five on the Canadian Albums Chart. It was certified gold by the Recording Industry Association of America, indicating sales of over 500,000 units. The album also reached number 11 on the UK Albums Chart. WWF The Music, Vol. 5 sold 176,000 units in its first week on sale, and as of April 2002 had shipped over 640,000 units.

=== Critical ===
Professional ratings
Review scores
Source	Rating
AllMusic	2/5 stars
The New Zealand Herald	1/5 stars
Slam! Wrestling	Unfavorable

Music website AllMusic awarded the album two out of five stars. Writer Darren Ratner noted that "the diehard wrestling fanatic will certainly appreciate it," but proposed that the tracks are more well suited to remaining as entrance themes on television. Ratner praised "The Game" and "I've Got It All", but criticised the original song "Pie". Alex Ristic of Slam! Wrestling also praised Triple H's entrance theme and criticised "Pie", but criticised the album for its inclusion of older material and concluded that "even a long time fan might not find enough enticing material." A review by Russell Baillie of The New Zealand Herald described the album as "truly, truly brutal."

== Track listing ==
All tracks are written by Jim Johnston, except where noted.

No.	Title	Subject(s)	Length
1.	"The Game" (performed by Motörhead)	Triple H	3:29
2.	"Rowdy"	K-Kwik	3:13
3.	"If You Dare"	Tazz	3:23
4.	"It Just Feels Right"	Lita	2:54
5.	"Out of the Fire"	Kane	3:09
6.	"Latino Heat"	Eddie Guerrero	2:50
7.	"I've Got It All"	"The One" Billy Gunn	3:26
8.	"What About Me?"	Raven	3:06
9.	"Who I Am"	Chyna	3:11
10.	"Medal"	Kurt Angle	2:52
11.	"Bad Man"	Rikishi	3:14
12.	"Shooter"	Chris Benoit	2:43
13.	"Turn It Up"	Too Cool	2:58
14.	"Pie"	co-written by Ricky Waters, The Rock and Brian Gewirtz, featuring Slick Rick	3:46
Total length:			46:44

Digital version
No.	Title	Subject(s)	Length
1.	"The Game" (performed by Motörhead)	Triple H	3:29
2.	"Rowdy"	K-Kwik	3:13
3.	"If You Dare"	Tazz	3:23
4.	"It Just Feels Right"	Lita	2:54
5.	"Out of the Fire"	Kane	3:09
6.	"Latino Heat"	Eddie Guerrero	2:50
7.	"I've Got It All"	"The One" Billy Gunn	3:26
8.	"What About Me?"	Raven	3:06
9.	"Who I Am"	Chyna	3:11
10.	"Medal"	Kurt Angle	2:52
11.	"Bad Man"	Rikishi	3:14
12.	"Turn It Up"	Too Cool	2:58
13.	"Pie"	co-written by Ricky Waters, The Rock and Brian Gewirtz, featuring Slick Rick	3:46
14.	"Which Road"	Free or Fired Survivor Series 2010	3:34
15.	"Written in My Face" (featuring Sean Jenness)	Sheamus	5:04
Total length:			52:39

== Charts ==
=== Weekly charts ===
Chart (2001)	Peak position
Canadian Albums (Billboard)	5
Scottish Albums (Official Charts)	9
UK Albums (Official Charts)	11
US Billboard 200	2
US Independent Albums (Billboard)	1

=== Year-end charts ===
Chart (2001)	Position
UK Albums (OCC)	200
US Billboard 200	151

== Certifications ==
Region	Certification	Sales/shipments
Canada (MC)	Gold	40,000^{^}
United Kingdom (BPI)	Gold	100,000^{^}
United States (RIAA)	Gold	640,000
^{^}shipments figures based on certification alone

== See also ==
- Music in professional wrestling
