= ThemeAddict: WWE The Music, Vol. 6 =

Compilation album by World Wrestling Entertainment
- Released: November 10, 2004
- Label: Columbia
- Producer: Jim Johnston

World Wrestling Entertainment chronology
WWE Originals (2004)	ThemeAddict: WWE The Music, Vol. 6 (2004)	WWE Wreckless Intent (2006)

Professional ratings
Review scores
Source	Rating
AllMusic	3/5 stars

ThemeAddict: WWE The Music, Vol. 6 is a compilation album released by WWE in 2004. It mostly features recent theme songs of wrestlers on the roster at the time. The album reached a peak of #38 on the Billboard 200 and #2 on the Billboard Top Soundtracks chart. It also marked the debut of Onika Maraj, or Nicki Minaj.

== Track listing ==
Composed by Jim Johnston (unless noted).

1. Evolution – "Line in the Sand" (performed by Motörhead)
2. Carlito Caribbean Cool – "Cool"
3. Theodore Long – "MacMilitant" (vocals by Miestro)
4. Christian – "Just Close Your Eyes" (performed by Waterproof Blonde)
5. Heidenreich – "Dangerous Politics"
6. WWE Diva Search – "Real Good Girl"
7. Chavo Guerrero – "Chavito Ardiente"
8. The Undertaker – "The Darkest Side (Remix)"
9. Eugene – "Child's Play"
10. Victoria – "Don't Mess With" (vocals by The Hood$tars and Nicki Minaj)
11. Shelton Benjamin – "Ain't No Stoppin' Me" (vocals by Lucien "Lou$tar" George)
12. Billy Kidman – "You Can Run" (vocals by Lorddikim "Boogie" Allah)
13. WWE SmackDown – "Rise Up" (performed by Drowning Pool)
14. Gail Kim – "International Woman" (performed by Dara Shindler)
15. John "Bradshaw" Layfield – "Longhorn"
16. John Cena and Tha Trademarc – "Untouchables" (composers: John Cena and Big Daddy Kane)

== See also ==
- Music in professional wrestling

== Notes ==
- The CD was released with a bonus DVD which featured the songs set to entrance videos. All but Christian's are featured on the DVD since Christian didn't start using the Waterproof Blonde entrance theme "Just Close Your Eyes" until after the album's release. Unlike the version he used for his entrance music, the version on the CD has extended lyrics.
- There is a hidden easter egg on the DVD of John Cena promoting his then-upcoming album You Can't See Me.
- Undertaker's arena theme is featured on the DVD, but not on the CD.
- There are time differences between the tracks on the DVD and the CD. Some tracks on the DVD version are longer than the CD's counterpart, and vice versa.
- Randy Orton's theme song "Burn in My Light" was originally on the track list featured on various promotional advertisements in select WWE PPV DVDs. However, it would not be released until 2006, on the album WWE Wreckless Intent.
- Nicki Minaj sings the vocals along with The Hood$tars to Victoria's theme song, "Don't Mess With". She is credited as Nicki Maraj.
