= WWF Full Metal: The Album =

Professional wrestlers' theme-tune compilation

Compilation album by World Wrestling Federation
- Released: 1995
- Genre: Soundtrack; entrance themes
- Length: 44:40
- Label: Edel

World Wrestling Federation chronology
WrestleMania: The Album (1993)	WWF Full Metal: The Album (1995)	WWF The Music, Volume 2 (1997)

Alternative cover
- 1996 reissue

WWF Full Metal: The Album is the first compilation album released by WWE (then known as the World Wrestling Federation, or WWF) in October 1995 by Edel Music. It features a selection of theme tunes of wrestlers on the roster at the time, and is considered to be Volume 1 of the WWE: The Music series. The album was reissued outside North America as WWF Champions: The Album – Full Metal Edition on September 24, 1996.

The album was named after the European WWF Full Metal Tour in October 1995, and commercials in Germany for the album were aired featuring Diesel and Razor Ramon.

== Critical reception ==
Professional ratings
Review scores
Source	Rating
Allmusic	3/5 stars

Steve Huey awarded WWF Full Metal: The Album three stars out of five, calling it "the perfect supplement for hardcore fans."

== Track listing ==
All tracks are written by Jim Johnston, except where noted.

No.	Title	Writer(s)	Artist(s)	Length
1.	"We're All Together Now"		WWF Superstars & Slam Jam	3:14
2.	"Thorn in Your Eye"		WWF Superstars & Slam Jam	3:34
3.	"Diesel Blues" (Diesel theme)			3:16
4.	"The Lyin' King" (King Mabel theme)			3:20
5.	"1-2-3" (1-2-3 Kid theme)			3:06
6.	"Goldust" (Goldust theme)			2:54
7.	"Smokin'" (The Smoking Gunns theme)			2:51
8.	"Psycho Dance" (Psycho Sid theme)			3:21
9.	"The Bad Guy" (Razor Ramon theme)			2:57
10.	"Hart Attack" (Bret "Hitman" Hart theme)	Jimmy Hart; John J. Maguire; Johnston		3:17
11.	"Angel" (Hakushi theme)			3:22
12.	"Graveyard Symphony" (The Undertaker theme)			3:13
13.	"Sexy Boy" (Shawn Michaels theme)	J. Hart; Maguire	Shawn Michaels	2:20
14.	"With My Baby Tonight" (Jeff Jarrett theme)		Jeff Jarrett	3:54
Total length:				44:40

iTunes bonus tracks
No.	Title	Artist(s)	Length
15.	"All About the Power" (David Otunga theme)	S-Preme	2:51
16.	"Broken Dreams" (Drew McIntyre theme)	Nathan Hunt of Shaman's Harvest	3:51
Total length:			51:23

"With My Baby Tonight" was actually performed by Brian James, who wrestled in the WWF at the time as "The Roadie" (and later as "The Road Dogg" Jesse James). Jeff Jarrett lip-synced the song for his performance at In Your House 2: The Lumberjacks.

== Slam Jam members ==
- Vocals: Jon Oliva (Savatage/Trans-Siberian Orchestra) (on "We're All Together Now")
- Vocals: Michel Begeame and Olli Schneider (Such A Surge) (on "Thorn in Your Eye")
- Guitar: Scott Ian (Anthrax)
- Guitar: Kenny Hickey (Type O Negative)
- Bass: Gary Meskil (Crumbsuckers/Pro Pain)
- Drums: Tim Mallare (Overkill)

== See also ==
- Music in professional wrestling
