= WWF The Music, Volume 3 =

Soundtrack album by World Wrestling Federation
- Released: December 29, 1998
- Genre: Soundtrack
- Length: 47:20
- Label: Koch
- Producer: Jim Johnston

World Wrestling Federation chronology
WWF The Music, Volume 2 (1997)	WWF The Music, Volume 3 (1998)	WWF The Music, Volume 4 (1999)

WWF The Music, Volume 3 is a soundtrack album by WWE (then known as the World Wrestling Federation, or WWF). Released on December 29, 1998, by Koch Records, it features entrance theme music of various WWF superstars, all of which were composed and performed by Jim Johnston (with the exception of one song, performed by Insane Clown Posse). The album was a commercial success, charting at number ten on the US Billboard 200.

== Composition ==
All songs on WWF The Music, Volume 3 were credited as being written, composed and performed by WWE composer Jim Johnston, with the exception of the entrance theme for The Oddities, which was credited to hip hop duo Insane Clown Posse And also Sable theme was released in 1996 for Marc Mero & Sable as a remix . Music website AllMusic categorised the album as heavy metal.

== Reception ==
=== Commercial ===
WWF The Music, Volume 3 was a commercial success. In the US, the album reached number ten on the US Billboard 200; in Canada, it reached number eight on the Canadian Albums Chart. It was certified platinum by the Recording Industry Association of America, indicating sales of over a million units. The album also reached number 97 on the UK Albums Chart. WWF The Music, Volume 3 was the first WWE album to sell a million copies, spent 30 weeks on the Billboard 200 and had sold a total of 1.21 million copies as of April 2002.

=== Critical ===
Music website AllMusic awarded the album one and a half out of five stars. Writer Becky Byrkit described it as "a truly marginal collectable," sarcastically declaring that "this record is to real music what the [WWE] is to real sports."

== Track listing ==
All tracks are written by Jim Johnston, except where noted.

No.	Title	Length
1.	"Undertaker"	3:33
2.	"Edge"	3:14
3.	"X-Pac"	3:09
4.	"Dude Love"	3:05
5.	"Kane"	3:10
6.	"The Rock"	3:12
7.	"Gangrel/The Brood"	3:39
8.	"Ken Shamrock"	3:40
9.	"Oddities" (composed and performed by Insane Clown Posse)	3:38
10.	"D-Generation X" (vocals performed by Chris Warren)	2:48
11.	"Sable"	3:53
12.	"New Age Outlaws"	3:06
13.	"Val Venis"	3:35
14.	"Stone Cold Steve Austin"	3:38
Total length:		47:20

Digital version bonus tracks
No.	Title	Subject(s)	Length
15.	"Just Don't Care Anymore"	Wade Barrett	2:41
16.	"Undertaker" (original Jim Johnston demo)	The Undertaker	3:38
Total length:			53:39

== Charts ==
Chart (1998)	Peak position
Canadian Albums Chart (Billboard)	8
UK Albums Chart (OCC)	97
US Billboard 200	10

== Certifications ==
Region	Certification	Sales/shipments
Canada (MC)	Platinum	80,000^{^}
United States (RIAA)	Platinum	1,210,000
^{^}shipments figures based on certification alone

== See also ==
- Music in professional wrestling
