= WWF The Music, Volume 4 =

Soundtrack album by World Wrestling Federation
- Released: November 2, 1999
- Genre: Soundtrack
- Length: 44:59
- Label: Koch
- Producer: Jim Johnston

World Wrestling Federation chronology
WWF The Music, Vol. 3 (1998)	WWF The Music, Volume 4 (1999)	WWF Aggression (2000)

WWF The Music, Volume 4 is a soundtrack album by WWE (then known as the World Wrestling Federation, or WWF). Released on November 2, 1999, by Koch Records, it features entrance theme music of various WWE superstars, all of which were composed and performed by Jim Johnston (with the exception of one song, performed by H-Blockx). The album was a commercial success, charting at number four in the U.S.

== Composition ==
All songs on WWF The Music, Volume 4 were written, composed and performed by WWE composer Jim Johnston, with the exception of "Oh Hell Yeah" which was performed by German heavy metal band H-Blockx. Music website AllMusic categorised the album as heavy metal and post-grunge, while a review on Slam! Wrestling identified additional genres including honky-tonk and hip hop on certain tracks.

== Reception ==
=== Commercial ===
WWF The Music, Volume 4 was a commercial success. In the US, the album reached number four on the US Billboard 200 and number 17 on the Top Internet Albums chart; in Canada, it reached number five on the Canadian Albums Chart. It was certified platinum by the Recording Industry Association of America, indicating sales of over a million units. The album also reached number 44 on the UK Albums Chart. WWF The Music, Volume 4 was the second WWE album to sell a million copies, and as of April 2002 had sold a total of 1.13 million copies.

=== Critical ===
Music website AllMusic awarded the album two out of five stars. Writer Stephen Thomas Erlewine noted that it "certainly has an audience," but that anyone other than "wrestling nuts ... pretty much knows not to bother in the first place." Alex Ristic of Slam! Wrestling was similarly sceptical, noting that while the album "represents the individual mat stars to a tee," that is "not necessarily a good thing." Ristic criticised tracks such as "Big" and "Sexual Chocolate", although did praise songs including "Break Down the Wall" and "Danger at the Door" and concluded that "the majority of [the material] is quite good."

== Track listing ==
All tracks are written by Jim Johnston.

No.	Title	Subject(s)	Length
1.	"Break Down the Wall"	Chris Jericho	3:25
2.	"Big"	The Big Show	3:20
3.	"No Chance in Hell"	The Corporation	2:02
4.	"Sexual Chocolate"	Mark Henry	3:11
5.	"This Is a Test"	Test	2:27
6.	"Wreck"	Mankind	3:05
7.	"Oh Hell Yeah" (performed by H-Blockx)	Stone Cold Steve Austin	3:16
8.	"Danger at the Door"	D'Lo Brown	3:15
9.	"Blood Brother"	Christian	3:17
10.	"AssMan"	Mr. Ass	2:53
11.	"Ministry"	The Undertaker	4:19
12.	"My Time"	Triple H and Chyna	3:27
13.	"On the Edge"	Edge	3:38
14.	"Know Your Role"	The Rock	3:24
Total length:			44:59

Digital version bonus tracks
No.	Title	Subject(s)	Length
15.	"Today"	The Four Horsemen	1:54
16.	"She Looks Good"	Eve	1:44
Total length:			48:37

== Charts ==
=== Weekly charts ===
Chart (1999)	Peak position
Canadian Albums (Billboard)	5
UK Albums (OCC)	44
US Billboard 200	4
US Top Internet Albums (Billboard)	17

=== Year-end charts ===
Chart (2000)	Position
US Billboard 200	128

== Certifications ==
Region	Certification	Sales/shipments
Canada (MC)	Platinum	80,000^{^}
United Kingdom (BPI)	Gold	100,000^{^}
United States (RIAA)	Platinum	1,130,000
^{^}shipments figures based on certification alone

== See also ==
- Music in professional wrestling
