= Jim Johnston (composer) =

American music composer (born 1952)

- Born: James Alan Johnston; June 19, 1952 (age 74); Pocahontas, Arkansas, U.S.
- Occupations: Composer; songwriter; musician
- Instruments: Acoustic guitar; electric guitar; bass guitar; drums; piano
- Years active: 1985–present
- Label: WWE Music Group (until 2017)
- Website: jimjohnston.com

James Alan Johnston (born June 19, 1952) is an American music composer and musician best known for his time with professional wrestling promotion, WWE. Over the course of three decades, he composed and recorded entrance theme music for the promotion's wrestlers, and compilations of his music released by WWE charted highly in several countries.

Writing and recording mostly by himself, he wrote over 10,000 pieces of music, many of which are as highly regarded as the wrestlers themselves. In later years, he regularly collaborated with mainstream hip hop & rock musicians such as Motörhead, Disturbed, Kid Rock, Ice-T, Run-DMC, Mariah Carey, and Our Lady Peace for new music and different takes on existing entrance music. Johnston was released from WWE in 2017, replaced in the role by CFO$.

== Career ==
"From his vignettes, I saw that Steve Austin was this ass-kicker of a guy who did not enter a room with subtlety. He needed something that reflected that. I had in my mind that this would be driving and low, but it needed something relentless about it. It needed to capture someone who entered a room and made you think, 'God only knows what happens next'. So I started playing driving notes on my guitar that implied danger. I thought of a car accident, only because of the horrible sound it makes. Then I went to glass, but the sound of the glass was so thin that I needed to make it bigger so I added the car crash. Right away I said, 'I get it. That's Steve Austin'. That was the best part of the job: creating a theme that fit the character. As soon as you heard Steve’s, it felt like it had already been his theme for years.

— Johnston discussing the creation of Steve Austin's theme song.

Johnston studied music and design at Hampshire College. His career began composing soundtracks for animated and industrial films, which led to working for the television networks HBO and Showtime. While living in Connecticut in the mid-1980's, Johnston met Brian Penry, art director for professional wrestling promotion World Wrestling Federation (WWF). Although not a fan of professional wrestling, Johnston soon began working under Vince McMahon to create entrance theme music for wrestlers.

WWF began releasing Johnston-produced theme music as compilation albums beginning with WWF Full Metal: The Album in 1995, with WWF The Music, Volume 3 achieving platinum status in the United States, signifying one million sales, while WWF The Music, Volume 4 reached number five in the Canadian Albums Chart. Following this, Johnston would collaborate with mainstream hip hop and rock musicians for albums, and Johnston would often hand-pick artists to work with on new theme songs. In 2001, WWF The Music, Vol. 5 reached number two on the Billboard 200 and number five in the Canadian and UK Albums Chart. In April 2013, the entrance theme of Fandango reached number 44 in the UK Singles Chart. On November 30, 2017, it was announced that Johnston was released by WWE after 32 years.

Johnston also scored several film projects for WWE's film division WWE Studios. These included The Chaperone, That's What I Am, and The Reunion. He also provided music for other WWE-affiliated products including the World Bodybuilding Federation and the XFL.

=== Appearances ===
Johnston appeared on camera at Battle at the Albert hall in 1991 as the organ player wearing phantom face paint, playing a Phantom of the Opera version of The Undertaker's theme Funeral March for his entrance. He also appeared on the videotape Piledriver: The Wrestling Album 2 to introduce the video for Girls in Cars. He orchestrated the live band at the Slammy Awards ceremonies, and traveled across the United States in 1995 as part of the "Raw Band". He also appeared on camera at WrestleMania XIV and SummerSlam (in March 1998 and August 1998, respectively) playing the D-Generation X theme with the Chris Warren Band. Johnston also had a brief clip in the film Beyond the Mat by discussing his reasoning behind Vader's theme music. Johnston also appeared on the bonus DVD for WWE Originals, the 2004 album by the same name. The DVD featured a 30-minute behind-the-scenes documentary on Johnston, offering insights into the composing, producing, and directing of the album. There are also some humorous interactions of Johnston with Jonathan Coachman and Stone Cold Steve Austin. Johnston also appeared on The Self-Destruction of the Ultimate Warrior discussing Ultimate Warrior's theme song, and how it was able to be truly representative of the character. Johnston also appeared on the WrestleMania XV DVD extras, commenting on WWE's music, and how music is crucial in WWE. He also appeared on an episode of Total Divas (season 4, episode 8) collaborating with Nikki Bella. In March 2014, WWE released a 60-minute DVD documentary about Johnston entitled Signature Sounds: The Music of WWE, following him as he crafts an entrance theme, and revisits some of the stories of his most famous compositions.

== Writing process and reception ==
In writing theme music, Johnston often drew from outside inspiration, notably John Williams' main title music from the movie Star Wars when composing the original theme song for The Undertaker. In a 2004 interview with Mix, he described feeling a "sense of responsibility" to create unique-sounding music for each wrestler, that also had instant recognisability. Johnston is credited with writing entrance theme songs for the most popular wrestlers over the course of his 30 year tenure, in particular the company's Attitude Era into the early-2000s. Johnston wrote, composed, and produced his compositions alone, in addition to playing all the instruments, including self-teaching a new instrument if necessary.

His music is described by Newsweek as being as "legendary as the WWE stars themselves," while Metal Hammer ranks some of his themes as the "most metal" songs used as entrance music. Vice said the tracks "weren't just catchy, colourful pieces of music, but cinematic scores that communicated the emotional makeup of your favourite wrestler clearer than any catchphrase ever could."

== Awards ==
Year	Result	Award	Category/Recipient(s)
2002	Won	BMI Cable Award	Raw
2003	Won	BMI Cable Award	Raw
2004	Won	BMI Cable Award	Raw
2008	Won	BMI Cable Award	Raw
2013	Won	BMI Cable Award	Raw
