= Music in professional wrestling =

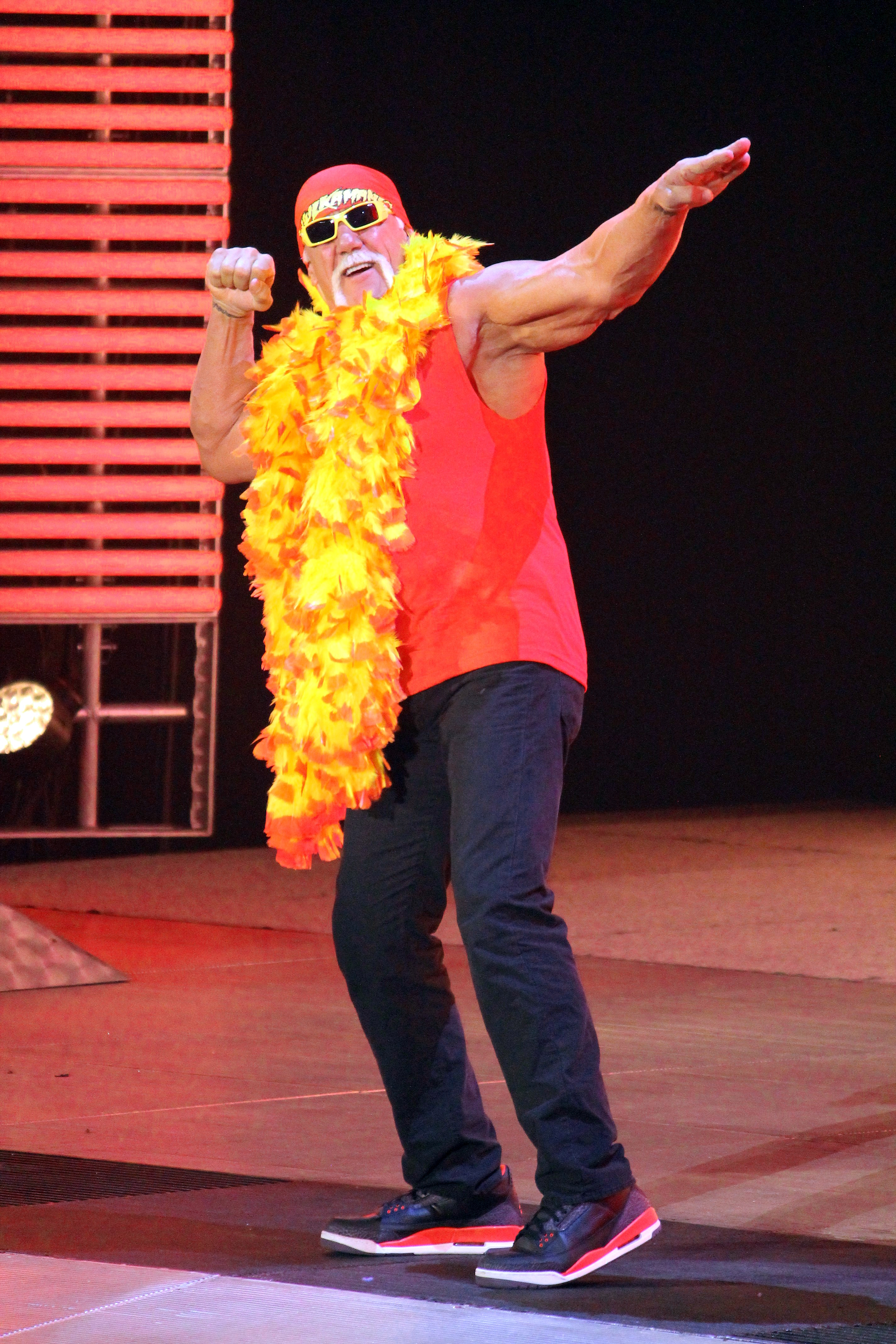
The most common use of music in professional wrestling is to play while a wrestler, tag team, or stable makes an appearance be it in the ring, on stage, or on the screen. An example seen here with Hulk Hogan making his entrance on a WWE Raw show.

Music in professional wrestling serves a variety of purposes. The most common uses of music in professional wrestling is that of the entrance theme, a song or piece of instrumental music which plays as a performer approaches the ring. After a match, the entrance theme of the victor will normally be played as they exit the ring. Entrance themes are used to alert the audience to the immediate arrival of a wrestler, and to increase anticipation.

== Usage as part of a gimmick ==
Entrance themes are often tailored to the gimmick of the wrestler they are written or selected for. For example, Hulk Hogan's most famous entrance theme in the WWE is Rick Derringer's "Real American", containing lyrics pertaining to Hogan's patriotism ("I am a real American; fight for the rights of every man..."), while The Undertaker has often used entrance themes which resemble a funeral march, including the ringing of an eerie funeral toll and a quote of Piano Sonata No. 2 (Chopin). In practice, modern day entrance themes are normally heavy metal, rock, rap, or contemporary R&B, as these genres of music are popular with the professional wrestling key demographics.

Some entrance themes are accompanied by the wrestler's recorded voice saying their signature phrase. Examples of this include Dwyane Johnson's recorded voice saying variations of his famous catchphrase, "If you smell what The Rock is cookin'!" and originally "Do you smell what The Rock is cookin'?" before his music starts, Booker T saying "Don't hate the player, hate the game" (WCW) and "Can you dig it, sucka?!?" (WWE) followed by his entrance theme, Zack Ryder’s recorded voice saying “Woo, woo, woo! You know it!" before his music starts, and Ric Flair's signature exclamation of "Wooooooo!" prior to his entrance theme. Occasionally, companies will pay to have popular licensed songs be used as themes for their more well-known performers. Examples of this include CM Punk having used "Cult of Personality" by Living Colour, or the Luchador La Parka performing a dancing entrance in a skeleton suit to Michael Jackson's "Thriller."

== Original music ==
Due to licensing costs, entrance themes are often composed by the professional wrestling promotion for which the wrestlers perform in order to avoid having to pay royalties. A promotion might also purchase music from production libraries, which is considered to be cheaper than the royalties of commercial music, or use public domain music, which is available for no fee. Due to less restrictive copyright laws in Mexico, lucha libre promotions use mostly popular songs. In addition, Extreme Championship Wrestling used popular commercial music (albeit without paying the proper royalties) for their various wrestlers in order to promote a hip, edgy, counter-culture image.

== History ==
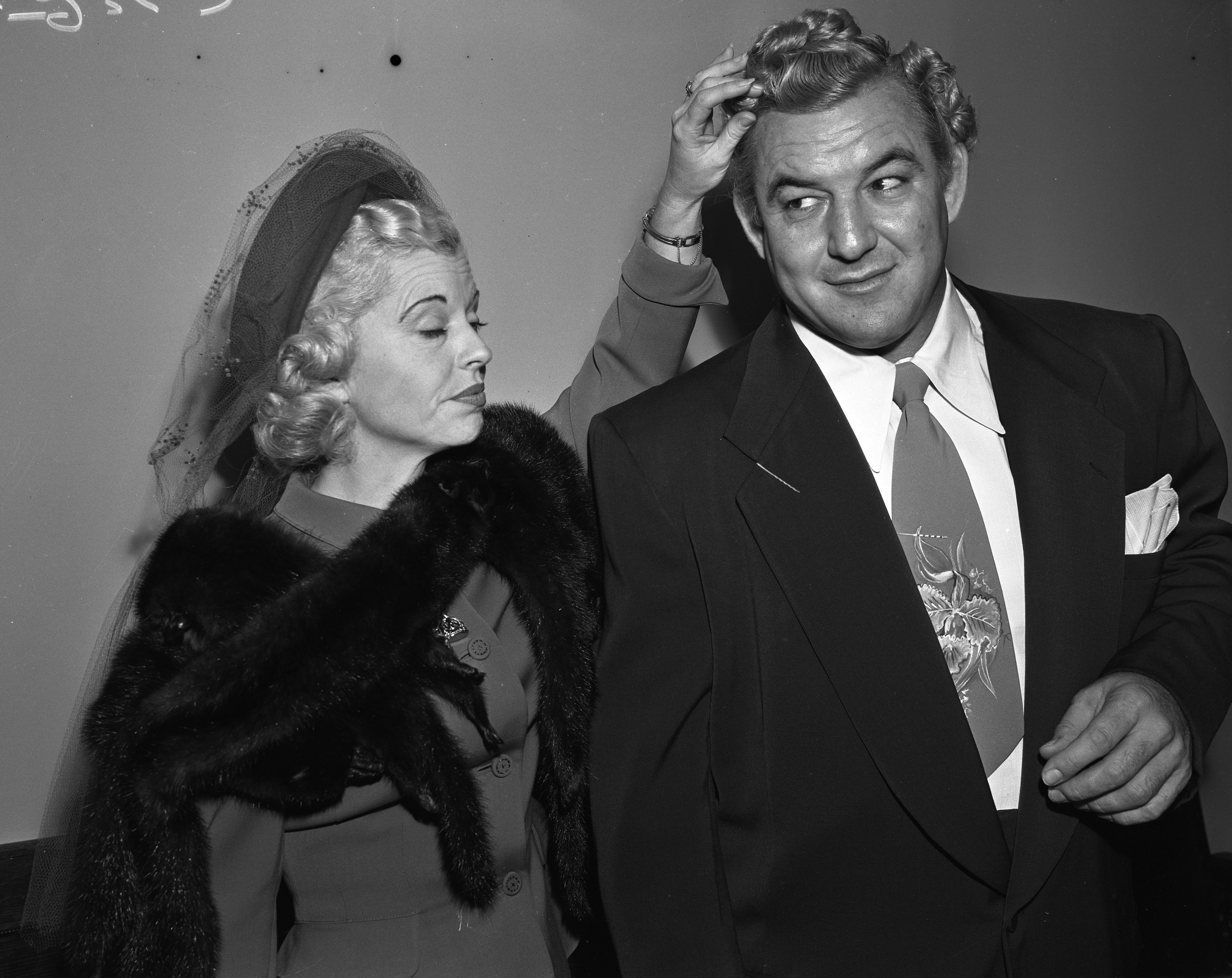
Gorgeous George was one of the few wrestlers in his time to have music accompany his entrances.

In the early 1950s, female champion Mildred Burke often entered to theme music, while Gorgeous George was associated with "Pomp and Circumstance Marches", a song which was later used regularly by Randy Savage. Around 1976, Chris Colt started using "Welcome To My Nightmare" as his entrance theme and "No More Mr. Nice Guy" as his exit theme, both songs made by Alice Cooper. Sgt. Slaughter, who has sometimes claimed to have introduced the idea to Vincent J. McMahon, entered to the "Marines' Hymn" at a Madison Square Garden show in the 1970s. Though British wrestler Shirley Crabtree had been using "I Shall Not Be Moved" as his entrance music in the 1970s in the United Kingdom. However, the practice did not become widespread until the 1980s, when the Fabulous Freebirds, Hulk Hogan, the Junkyard Dog, and various World Class Championship Wrestling performers began using rock music for entrance themes.

Music is also used as a promotional tool during advertisements, video packages, and as the theme of television programs.

== In-house composers ==
The following are composers known for composing numerous in-house theme songs for particular wrestling promotions:

- Jimmy Hart (composed music for the WWE and World Championship Wrestling)
- Michael Hayes (composed music for the WWE and World Championship Wrestling)
- Jim Johnston (composed music for WWE)
- CFO$ (composed music for WWE)
- Anthony Mirabella III (credited as def rebel) (composes music for WWE)
- Dale Oliver (composed music for TNA Wrestling)
- Sheri Shaw (Sstaria) (composed music for Impact Wrestling)
- Harry Slash & The Slashtones (composed music for Extreme Championship Wrestling)
- Yonosuke Kitamura (composes music for New Japan Pro-Wrestling)
- Julia Claris (composes music for New Japan Pro-Wrestling)
- May's (composes music for New Japan Pro-Wrestling)
- [Q] Brick (composes music for New Japan Pro-Wrestling)
- No Name Tim (composes music for New Japan Pro-Wrestling, TNA Wrestling, All Elite Wrestling and various independent wrestlers)
- Hot Tag Media Works (composes music for Ring of Honor)
- Adam Massacre (composes music for Ring of Honor)
- Downstait (composes music for WWE)
- Mikey Rukus AKA Mikey Ruckus (composes music for All Elite Wrestling)
- John Kiernan (composes music for United Wrestling Network and various independent wrestlers)
- Mike Rodgers (a.k.a. 'Mike the Rodgers') (composes music for Combat Zone Wrestling)
