= You Can't See Me =

Studio album by John Cena and Tha Trademarc
- Released: May 10, 2005
- Recorded: 2004–05
- Studios: Basscamp Studios; Lobo Recording Studios (New York City)
- Genre: Hip-hop
- Length: 65:27
- Labels: WWE; Columbia
- Producers: James McEwan (exec.); Todd Spadafore (exec.); Chaos & Order; Eligh; Hidden Agenda; Jake One; The Freakas

Singles from You Can't See Me
- 1. "The Time Is Now" Released: March 17, 2005; 2. "Bad, Bad Man" Released: 2005; 3. "Right Now" Released: 2005

Professional ratings
Review scores
Source	Rating
AllMusic	2.5/5 stars
RapReviews	7.5/10 stars
Stylus Magazine	(D+)

You Can't See Me is the only studio album by John Cena and Tha Trademarc. It was released on May 10, 2005, by Columbia Records and WWE Music Group. The album features guest appearances from Esoteric and Bumpy Knuckles, the latter being featured on several songs throughout the album. The album production was handled by James McEwan and Todd Spadafore, with the duo serving as the executive producers on the album. The album's cover art is based on Cena's customized WWE Championship belt, while the title comes from his popular catchphrase coined on WWE television.

You Can't See Me debuted and peaked at number 15 on the Billboard 200 charts, with over 145,000 copies sold in the first week of its release and 385,000 as of October 2014. In the United Kingdom, the album peaked at number 103 on the UK Albums Chart.

== Track listing ==
All tracks written by John Cena and Marc Predka, unless otherwise noted. All tracks produced by Chaos & Order, unless otherwise noted.

No.	Title	Writer(s)	Producer(s)	Length
1.	"The Time Is Now"		Jake One	2:57
2.	"Don't Fuck With Us"		Eligh	3:25
3.	"Flow Easy" (featuring Bumpy Knuckles)	Cena, Predka, Freddie Foxxx	Hidden Agenda	3:49
4.	"Right Now"			3:47
5.	"Make It Loud"		The Freakas	4:20
6.	"Just Another Day"		Jake One	3:58
7.	"Summer Flings"	Cena, Predka, Rue Debona		3:35
8.	"Keep Frontin'" (featuring Bumpy Knuckles)	Cena, Predka, Foxxx	Hidden Agenda	4:15
9.	"We Didn't Want You to Know"		Jake One	4:16
10.	"Bad, Bad Man" (featuring Bumpy Knuckles)	Cena, Predka, Foxxx		3:31
11.	"Running Game"			4:12
12.	"Beantown" (featuring Esoteric)	Cena, Predka, Seamus Ryan		3:48
13.	"This Is How We Roll"			4:10
14.	"What Now?"			5:10
15.	"Know the Rep" (featuring Bumpy Knuckles)	Cena, Predka, Foxxx	Jake One	3:00
16.	"Chain Gang Is da Click"			3:52
17.	"If It All Ended Tomorrow"			4:31

Sample credits

- "The Time Is Now" contains samples from:
  - "Ante Up"; written by Jamal Grinnage, Eric Murray, and Darryl Pittman; performed by M.O.P..
  - "The Night the Lights Went Out in Georgia", written by Bobby Russell, performed by Pete Schofield and the Canadians.
- "Right Now" contains a sample from "Now", written by Alta Sherral Willis and Patrick Henderson, performed by L.T.D..
- "Make It Loud" contains a sample from "Ghetto Life", written and performed by Rick James.
- "Just Another Day" contains a sample from "As Long As You Are There", written and performed by Carolyn Franklin.
- "Summer Flings" contains a sample from "Dance the Kung Fu", written and performed by Carl Douglas.
- "Keep Frontin'" contains a sample from "On the Mic", written by Lamont Coleman and Roc Raida, performed by Big L.
- "Bad, Bad Man" contains a sample of "Hard Drive", written by Branislav Zivkavic.
- "Running Game" contains a sample from "The Hunter Gets Captured by the Game", written by Smokey Robinson, performed by the Marvelettes.
- "Beantown" contains samples from:
  - "Problemz", written by Lawrence Parker, performed by KRS-One.
  - "Fall of Solomon", written by Walter Reed, performed by Killah Priest.
  - "Cocaine", written by J. J. Cale, performed by Eric Clapton.
- "Know the Rep" contains a sample from "Track of the Cat", written by Thom Bell and Linda Creed, performed by Dionne Warwick.

=== Notes ===
- The first track, "The Time is Now", has been used by Cena as his entrance music since the March 17, 2005 episode of SmackDown.
- "The Time is Now" contains samples from "Ante Up" by M.O.P. and "The Night the Lights Went Out in Georgia" by Bobby Russell. In 2008, M.O.P. filed a lawsuit in a New York Federal Court against Sony BMG, WWE and Cena, alleging copyright infringement. M.O.P. sought the destruction of the song and asked for $150,000 in damages. They dropped the lawsuit two months later.
- Cena originally stated on WWE.com that his previous entrance theme song, "Basic Thuganomics", would appear on the album. However, it did not make it onto the album. It was released on the WWE Originals soundtrack album in January 2004.
- ” If It All Ended Tomorrow” was used in the 2006 film The Marine as the ending credits theme.

== Videos ==
- The music video for "Bad, Bad Man" spoofs 1980s culture, and focusing on the television series The A-Team, with guest stars like Gary Coleman and impersonators of Michael Jackson, Madonna, among other popular celebrities. This video is featured on the DVD for WWE's 2005 edition of Judgment Day.
- The music video for "Right Now" was shot in West Newbury, Massachusetts and Hampton Beach, New Hampshire and features clips from Cena's family videos, circling in on his personal life and rise in WWE. This video was released on the DVD for WWE's 2005 edition of SummerSlam and on Cena's documentary, My Life.

== Personnel ==
- Steve Belleville – bass guitar (4)
- Chaos – engineer (1, 2, 4–7, 9–14, 16, 17), mixing (1, 2, 4–7, 9–17), scratches (5, 7, 16)
- Andre Debourge – engineer (3, 8, 15), mixing (3, 8)
- Kristin Ezbicki – flute, guitar, and additional vocals (14)
- The Freakas – mixing (1, 2, 4–7, 9–17), scratches (12)

== Charts ==
Chart (2005)	Peak position
Australian Albums (ARIA)	32
Italian Albums (FIMI)	11
UK Albums (OCC)	103
US Billboard 200	15
US R&B/Hip-Hop Albums (Billboard)	10
US Rap Albums (Billboard)	3
US Internet Albums (Billboard)	47

== See also ==
- Music in professional wrestling
