= The Time Is Now (John Cena song) =

Single by John Cena and Tha Trademarc

from the album You Can't See Me
- Released: March 17, 2005
- Recorded: 2004
- Genre: Hip hop
- Length: 2:57
- Label: WWE
- Songwriters: John Cena; Marc Predka; Robert L. Russell; Jamal Grinnage; Eric Murray; Darryl Pittman
- Producer: Jake One

John Cena and Tha Trademarc singles chronology
"Untouchables" (2003)	"The Time Is Now" (2005)	"Bad Bad Man" (2005)

Audio sample
- file; help

"The Time Is Now" or "My Time Is Now" is a song by professional wrestler and actor John Cena. It was the entrance theme used by Cena in WWE since the March 17, 2005 episode of WWE SmackDown. Cena recorded the song in 2004 for his debut studio album, You Can't See Me. The song was released on March 17, 2005, as the lead single from the album on Columbia and WWE Music Group. The song was released as a single on the iTunes Store on June 20, 2011.

The song is also widely known as being part of the Internet meme "Unexpected John Cena".

== Background ==
Cena made his television debut answering an open challenge by Kurt Angle on June 27, 2002. In October, Cena and Billy Kidman took part in a tag team tournament to crown the first WWE Tag Team Champions of the SmackDown! brand, losing in the first round. The next week, Cena turned on and attacked Kidman, blaming him for their loss, becoming a villain. Shortly after the Kidman attack, on a Halloween-themed episode of SmackDown, Cena dressed as Vanilla Ice performing a freestyle rap. The next week, Cena received a new character: a rapper who cuts promos while rhyming.

He performed his own theme song, "Basic Thugonomics", and it was featured on the WWE soundtrack album WWE Originals. He also recorded a song, "Untouchables", for the company's next soundtrack album WWE ThemeAddict: The Music, Vol. 6. He collaborated on the song "H-U-S-T-L-E remix" along with Murs, E-40, and Chingo Bling. Cena's debut album, You Can't See Me, was recorded with his cousin Tha Trademarc.

== Composition ==
"The Time Is Now" was composed by Cena along with his cousin, Marc Predka (better known by his stage name Trademarc), and recorded in 2004. Having recorded the album with Cena, Predka was featured on virtually every track of the album. Production was handled by Jake One. The song contains samples of "Ante Up" by M.O.P. which in turn samples "Soul Sister, Brown Sugar" by Sam & Dave, and Pete Schofield and The Canadians' rendition of "The Night the Lights Went Out in Georgia" originally by Vicki Lawrence.

On October 14, 2008, M.O.P. filed suit in a New York Federal Court against Sony BMG, Stephanie Music Publishing, Cherry Lane Music Publishing Company, WWE and John Cena. The group alleged that Cena and the WWE stole parts of their song "Ante Up" for his theme song, arguing that the song was unlawfully sampled and clearly repeated three times, during the introduction, the second and third chorus. M.O.P. sought the destruction of the song and $150,000 in damages. They dropped the lawsuit two months later.
