= John Cena =

American actor and professional wrestler (born 1977)

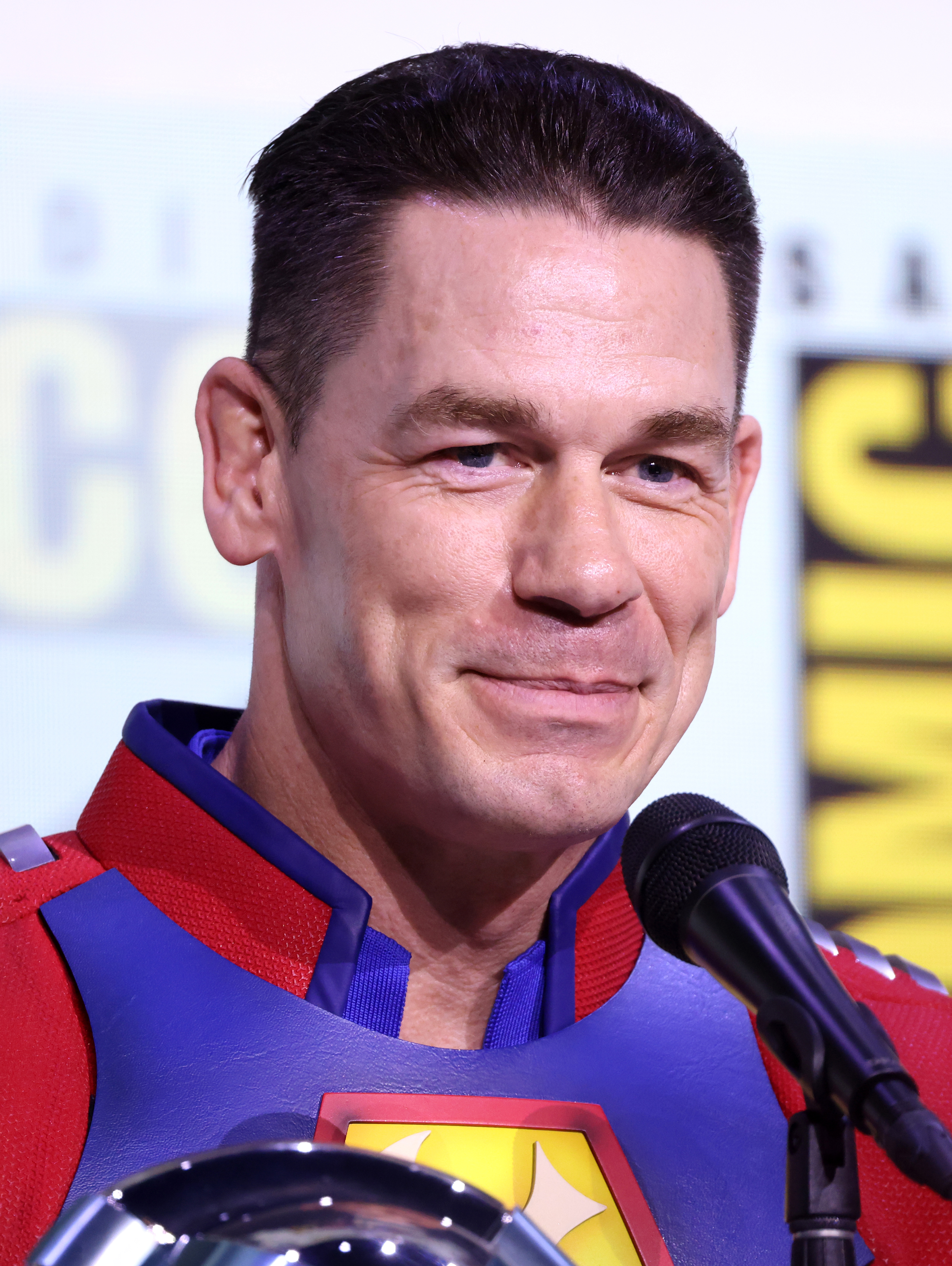
- Cena at the 2025 San Diego Comic-Con
- Born: John Felix Anthony Cena; April 23, 1977 (age 49); West Newbury, Massachusetts, U.S.
- Education: Springfield College (BS)
- Occupations: Actor; professional wrestler; rapper
- Years active: 1999–2025 (wrestler); 2004–2005; 2014 (rapper); 2006–present (actor)
- Works: Filmography
- Spouses: Elizabeth Huberdeau (m. 2009; div. 2012) Shay Shariatzadeh (m. 2020)
- Partner(s): Nikki Bella (2012–2018)
- Relatives: Ulysses J. Lupien (great-grandfather); Tony Lupien (grandfather); Trademarc (cousin); Natalie Enright Jerger (cousin)
- Professional wrestling career
- Ring name(s): John Cena; Juan Cena; Mr. P The Prototype
- Billed height: 6 ft 1 in (185 cm)
- Billed weight: 251 lb (114 kg)
- Billed from: "Classified"; West Newbury, Massachusetts; Los Angeles, California
- Trained by: Christopher Daniels; Mike Bell; Tom Howard; Ultimate Pro Wrestling; Danny Davis; Fit Finlay; Jim Cornette; Ohio Valley Wrestling
- Debut: November 5, 1999
- Retired: December 13, 2025
- John Cena's voice John Cena on his inclusion as Peacemaker in Mortal Kombat 1

John Felix Anthony Cena (/ˈsiːnə/ SEE-nə; born April 23, 1977) is an American actor, retired professional wrestler, and former rapper. He is signed to WWE as a brand ambassador. Cena wrestled for WWE for 24 years, becoming a record-setting 17-time world champion, before transitioning fully into his acting career.

Cena began professional wrestling in 1999 and signed with the World Wrestling Federation in 2001 (renamed WWE in 2002), where he began in its then-developmental territory Ohio Valley Wrestling (OVW). After debuting on the main roster on WWE SmackDown! in 2002, he rose to prominence as a brash heel rapper, before becoming the company's franchise player from the mid-2000s to the mid-2010s. He wrestled on a part-time schedule from 2017 until his retirement in 2025. His run as a face from 2003 to 2025 was the longest continuous portrayal of a heroic character in WWE history.

Cena held numerous championships and accomplishments in WWE, including the WWE Championship a record 14 times and the World Heavyweight Championship three times. (Note: This refers to the version of the championship active between 2002 and 2013.) He is the 35th Triple Crown and 25th Grand Slam champion, won the Royal Rumble match twice, the Elimination Chamber match four times, the Money in the Bank match once, and headlined multiple major WWE pay-per-view and livestreaming events. Cena's full-time career received mixed critical and audience reception, with praise for his character work and promotional skills but criticism for his perceived over-representation and on-screen dominance relative to other wrestlers. In contrast, his later career was more positively received.

Cena began acting in 2006 and has done both comedy and action films, receiving praise for his roles in the Fred trilogy (2010–2012), Trainwreck (2015), Blockers (2018), and The Suicide Squad (2021). He has also starred in films such as The Marine (2006), Bumblebee (2018), and F9 (2021), as well as portraying the title character in the superhero series Peacemaker (2022–2025). In music, he released the rap album You Can't See Me in 2005, which peaked at No. 15 on the Billboard 200. Cena is also known for his charity work, granting more than 650 wishes for the Make-A-Wish Foundation, the most in the organization's history.

== Early life ==
John Felix Anthony Cena was born in West Newbury, Massachusetts, on April 23, 1977, to Carol and John Joseph Cena. He has four brothers named Dan, Matt, Steve, and Sean. Cena's maternal grandfather was baseball player Tony Lupien, a son of businessman Ulysses J. Lupien, and he is cousins with computer scientist Natalie Enright Jerger. Cena was educated at Central Catholic High School in Lawrence, Massachusetts, before moving to Cushing Academy in Ashburnham, Massachusetts. He then attended Springfield College in Springfield, Massachusetts, where he was an NCAA Division III All-American center and football team captain. After graduating in 1999 with a degree in exercise physiology and kinesiology, he pursued a bodybuilding career and worked as a limousine driver. He also worked at Gold's Gym.

== Professional wrestling career ==
=== Ultimate Pro Wrestling (1999–2001) ===
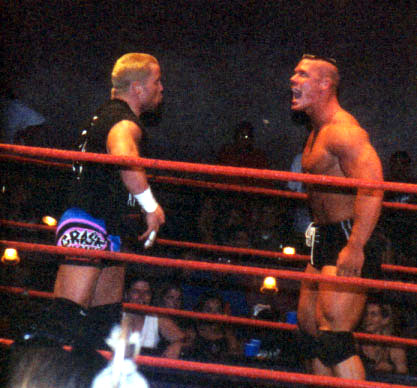
Cena facing Crash Holly at an Ultimate Pro Wrestling (UPW) show in 2000

In 1998, Cena moved to California to train for professional wrestling at Ultimate Pro Wrestling's (UPW) Ultimate University, operated by Rick Bassman. He adopted a semi-robotic persona called "the Prototype", wrestling at local events and holding the UPW Heavyweight Championship in 2000. His early career was partially featured in the Discovery Channel documentary Inside Pro Wrestling School. Cena remained with UPW until March 2001.

=== World Wrestling Federation/Entertainment/WWE (2000–present) ===
==== Ohio Valley Wrestling (2000–2002) ====
On October 10, 2000, Cena made his unofficial World Wrestling Federation (WWF) debut in a dark match on WWE SmackDown! as the Prototype. He signed a developmental contract in 2001 and was assigned to Ohio Valley Wrestling (OVW), WWF's developmental territory, where he held the OVW Heavyweight Championship and the OVW Southern Tag Team Championship with Rico Constantino. While competing in OVW, Cena also wrestled in WWF dark matches and house shows before being called up to the main roster in June 2002. He continued to appear in OVW until September and made a final appearance there in November under the name Mr. P.

==== Doctor of Thuganomics (2002–2004) ====
Cena made his official WWE television debut on June 27, 2002, answering Kurt Angle's open challenge on SmackDown! and declaring he possessed "ruthless aggression". Even though he lost the match against Angle, Cena was praised for his efforts in the match. Cena soon feuded with Chris Jericho, defeating Jericho at Vengeance on July 21. On the October 24 episode of SmackDown!, Cena attacked Billy Kidman after losing to him, turning heel for the first time in his WWE career. After the heel turn, Cena adopted a rapper persona inspired by a backstage freestyle overheard by Stephanie McMahon and Paul Heyman. Debuting the "Doctor of Thuganomics" character, Cena began performing freestyle raps in promos and wore jerseys and hats as part of his gimmick, along with the slogan "Word Life". Cena was briefly paired with enforcer B-2 and then Red Dogg until Red Dogg was sent to the Raw brand in February. At the Royal Rumble on January 19, 2003, Cena made his first appearance in the Royal Rumble match but was eliminated by the Undertaker. Cena then entered a number-one contender tournament for the WWE Championship, defeating Eddie Guerrero, the Undertaker, and Chris Benoit before losing to champion Brock Lesnar at Backlash on April 27. Cena continued high-profile feuds with the Undertaker, losing to him at Vengeance on July 27, and Angle, losing to him at No Mercy on October 19. He eventually turned face on the November 6 episode of SmackDown!, joining Angle's team at Survivor Series on November 16, where Team Angle defeated Team Lesnar (Brock Lesnar, A-Train, Big Show, Matt Morgan, and Nathan Jones).

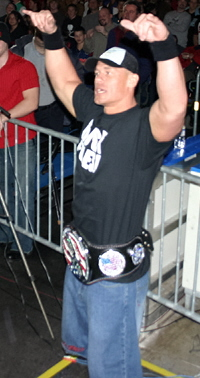
Cena with his customized United States Championship belt in 2005

At the Royal Rumble on January 25, 2004, Cena participated in the Royal Rumble match and was eliminated by Big Show, and then lost a Triple Threat match to determine the number one contender to the WWE Championship to Angle (also involving Big Show) No Way Out on February 15. At WrestleMania XX on March 14, Cena defeated Big Show to win the United States Championship, his first singles title in WWE. Cena retained the title at Judgment Day on May 16 against René Duprée, and then at The Great American Bash on June 27 against Booker T, Réne Duprée, and Rob Van Dam, before being stripped of it on the July 8 of SmackDown! after accidentally knocking over Angle, who had become General Manager, during his title defense against Booker T. Cena regained the title by defeating Booker T in a best of five series that began at SummerSlam on August 15, and concluded at No Mercy on October 3, but Cena lost the United States Championship days later to Carlito Caribbean Cool on the October 7 episode of SmackDown!. Their storyline escalated when Cena was (kayfabe) stabbed in a nightclub by Carlito's bodyguard Jesús, an angle used to explain his absence while filming The Marine. Cena returned at Survivor Series to team with Eddie Guerrero, Big Show, and Rob Van Dam to defeat Angle, Luther Reigns, Mark Jindrak, and Carlito in a Survivor Series match on November 14, and regained the title on the November 18 episode of SmackDown!, then defeated Jesús in a street fight at Armageddon on December 12.

==== WWE Champion (2005–2007) ====
At the Royal Rumble on January 30, 2005, Cena and Batista were the final two participants and were eliminated simultaneously by one another. After a restart, Batista won. Cena defeated Kurt Angle at No Way Out on February 20 in the finals of a tournament to determine the number one contender for the WWE Championship at WrestleMania 21 on April 3, beginning a feud with champion John "Bradshaw" Layfield (JBL). Although Cena lost his United States Championship to Orlando Jordan on the March 3 episode of SmackDown!, Cena defeated JBL at WrestleMania to win his first WWE Championship. Cena introduced a customized spinner belt and defeated JBL again in an "I Quit" match at Judgment Day on May 22.

As part of the 2005 WWE Draft Lottery on the June 6 episode of WWE Raw, Cena was drafted to the Raw brand by becoming the first pick. Cena began a feud with General Manager Eric Bischoff, who opposed Cena's refusal to participate in fighting the ECW roster at ECW One Night Stand on June 12. At Vengeance on June 26, Cena retained his title in a triple threat match against Christian and Chris Jericho. Bischoff backed Jericho as his chosen challenger, but Cena retained his championship against Jericho at SummerSlam on August 21, and defeated Jericho again in a "You're Fired" match on the August 22 episode of Raw. Angle subsequently replaced Jericho as Bischoff's hand-picked contender. Over the next few months, Cena lost to Angle by disqualification at Unforgiven on September 18, pinned Shawn Michaels at Taboo Tuesday on November 1 in a triple threat match involving Angle, and pinned Angle at Survivor Series on November 27. During this feud, Cena added a submission finisher, the STF, in preparation for a triple threat submission match for the WWE Championship against Angle and Chris Masters on the November 28 episode of Raw.

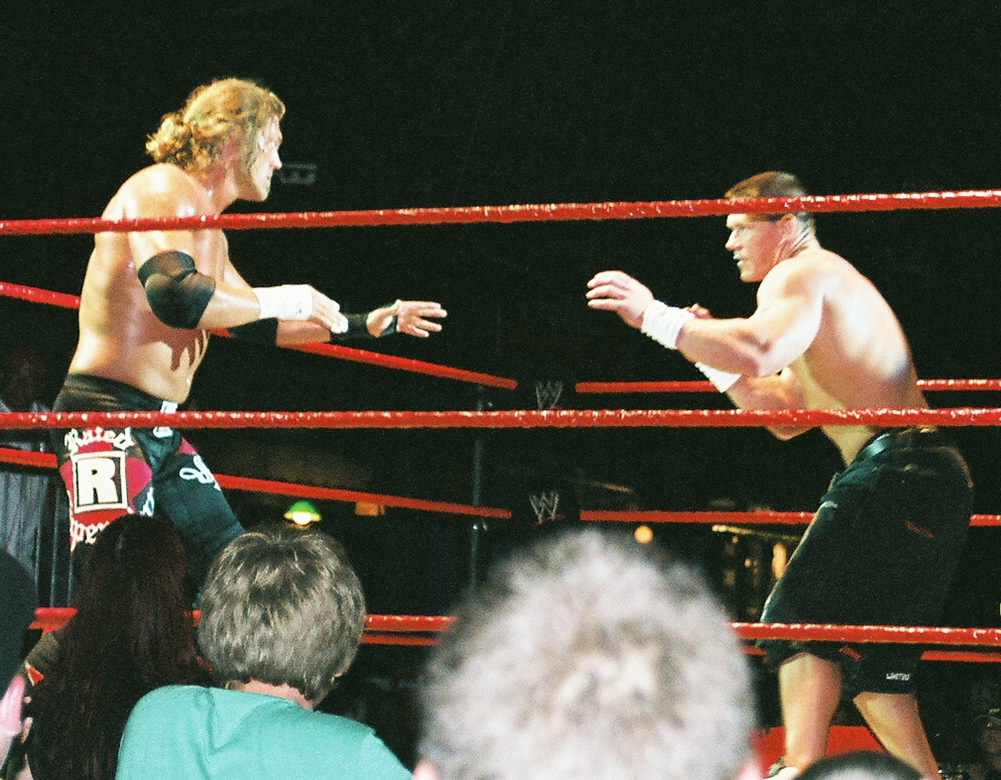
Cena facing off against Edge at a house show in 2006

Cena retained the WWE Championship in an Elimination Chamber match against Carlito, Chris Masters, Shawn Michaels, Kane, and Angle at New Year's Revolution on January 8, 2006, but immediately lost it to Edge, who cashed in his Money in the Bank contract. Cena regained the title by defeating Edge at the Royal Rumble on January 29, and retained it against Triple H at WrestleMania 22 on April 2, Cena's first WrestleMania headlining match. Cena lost the title a few months later to Rob Van Dam at ECW One Night Stand on June 11 due to Edge's interference, in a match where the crowd was notably hostile to Cena. Edge later won the title from Van Dam in a Triple Threat match involving Cena on the July 3 episode of Raw, leading to a lengthy feud that ended with Cena defeating Edge in a Tables, Ladders and Chairs match at Unforgiven on September 17 to reclaim the championship. Cena returned with his version of the spinner title belt on the next night's Raw. Cena was involved in a Champion of Champions match at Cyber Sunday on November 5 against Big Show and King Booker. Kevin Federline interfered and cost Cena the match, leading to the duo feuding. In the new year, Federline pinned Cena on the January 1, 2007 episode of Raw with an assist from Umaga. Cena then defended his championship against Umaga twice at New Year's Revolution on January 7, and in a Last Man Standing match at the Royal Rumble on January 28.

The night afterwards on Raw, Cena teamed with Shawn Michaels to win the World Tag Team Championship from Rated-RKO (Edge and Randy Orton) before defeating Michaels at WrestleMania 23 on April 1 to retain the WWE Championship. Michaels turned on Cena the night after, costing the pair the World Tag Team Championship in a battle royal. In the summer, Cena also defeated The Great Khali at Judgment Day on May 20 by submission, and then at One Night Stand on June 3 by pinfall, defeated Bobby Lashley, King Booker, Mick Foley, and Randy Orton in a five-pack challenge at Vengeance: Night of Champions on June 24, and successfully defended his title against Lashley at The Great American Bash on July 22. He then began a feud with Randy Orton, retaining the title against Orton at SummerSlam on August 26, followed by another win at Unforgiven on September 16. On the October 1 episode of Raw, Cena suffered a legitimate torn pectoral muscle during a match against Mr. Kennedy and was sidelined indefinitely. Cena was stripped of the WWE Championship the following night on ECW, ending his 380-day reign. Cena underwent surgery for his injury at St. Vincent's Hospital in Birmingham, Alabama.

==== World Heavyweight Champion (2008–2010) ====
At the Royal Rumble on January 27, 2008, Cena made a surprise return as the final participant of the Royal Rumble match, which he won by last eliminating Triple H. Rather than wait for WrestleMania XXIV on March 30, Cena used his title shot against WWE Champion Randy Orton at No Way Out on February 17 but won by disqualification, thus not capturing the title. Despite this, Cena was later added to the title match at WrestleMania XXIV, making it a triple threat, but was pinned by Orton. Following WrestleMania, Cena feuded with JBL, defeating JBL at Judgment Day on May 18, and at One Night Stand on June 1 in a First Blood match. Cena later unsuccessfully challenged Triple H for the WWE Championship at Night of Champions on June 29, before losing to JBL in a New York City Parking Lot Brawl at The Great American Bash on July 20.

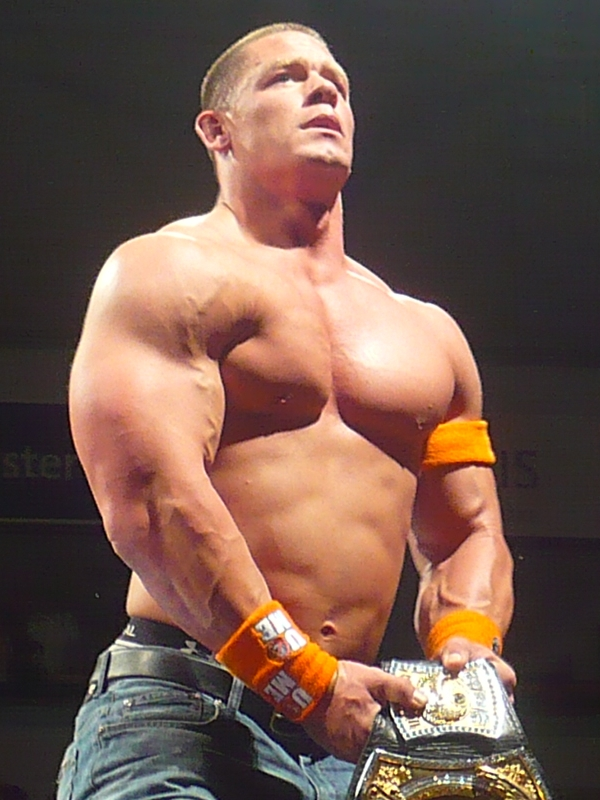
Cena as WWE Champion in 2010

On the August 4 episode of Raw, Cena and Batista won the World Tag Team Championship by defeating Cody Rhodes and Ted DiBiase. Cena and Batista lost the titles back to Rhodes and DiBiase on the August 11 episode of Raw. At SummerSlam on August 17, in a loss to Batista, Cena suffered a legitimate neck injury, which sidelined him until his return at Survivor Series on November 23 following surgery, where he defeated Chris Jericho to win his first World Heavyweight Championship. While retaining the title first against Jericho at Armageddon on December 14, and then against JBL at the Royal Rumble on January 25, 2009, Cena lost the title to Edge at No Way Out in an Elimination Chamber match. Cena regained the title at WrestleMania 25 on April 5 in a triple threat match involving Big Show but lost it back to Edge at Backlash on April 26 in a Last Man Standing match after Big Show chokeslammed Cena through a spotlight. Cena then began a feud with Big Show, first defeating him at Judgment Day on May 17, and then at Extreme Rules on June 7 in a Submission match, and ended a brief feud with The Miz, which began on the April 27 episode of Raw, at The Bash on June 28.

Cena competed against Randy Orton and Triple H in a Triple Threat match for the WWE Championship at Night of Champions on July 26, but lost. On the July 27 episode of Raw, Cena became the number one contender for Orton's WWE Championship at SummerSlam on August 23, where he was again unsuccessful, but captured the title at Breaking Point on September 13 by defeating Orton in an "I Quit" match. Cena further traded the championship with Orton several times over the year, losing it to Orton a month later at Hell in a Cell on October 4, and regaining it at Bragging Rights on October 25 in a 60-minute iron man match under Anything Goes rules. Cena successfully defended the title against Shawn Michaels and Triple H in a Triple Threat match at Survivor Series on November 22, before losing it to Sheamus at TLC: Tables, Ladders & Chairs on December 13 in a tables match. After being eliminated by a surprise-returning Edge at the Royal Rumble on January 31, 2010, Cena regained the WWE Championship by defeating Triple H, Sheamus, Kofi Kingston, Ted DiBiase, and Randy Orton in an Elimination Chamber match at Elimination Chamber on February 21 but lost it moments later to Batista in an impromptu match. Cena defeated Batista to regain the title at WrestleMania XXVI on March 28, and retained the title in a Last Man Standing match at Extreme Rules on April 25, and then in an "I Quit" match at Over the Limit on May 23, ending their feud.

==== Storyline with the Nexus (2010–2011) ====
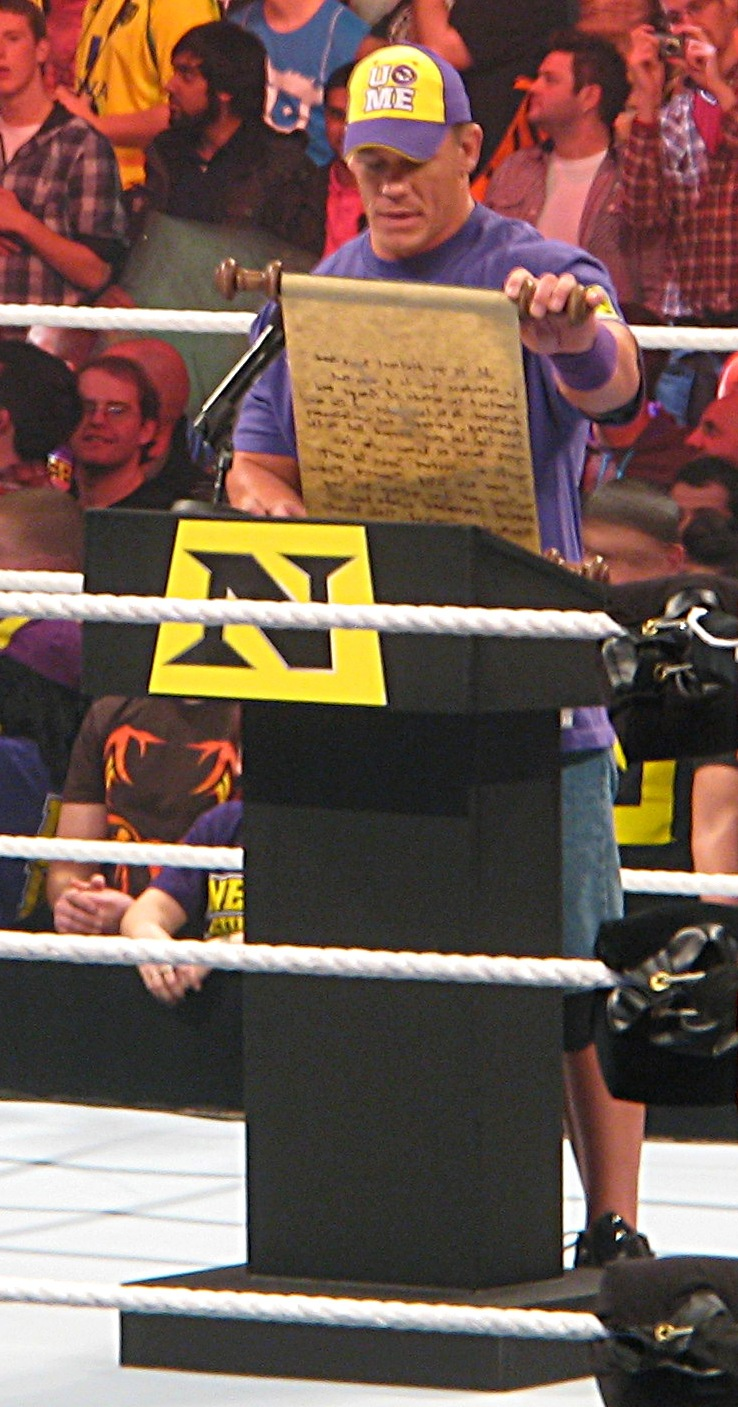
Cena being forced to read a public address by Wade Barrett while a member of the Nexus in November 2010

On the June 7 episode of Raw, during a match against CM Punk, Cena was attacked by all eight former contestants of the first season of NXT, with Wade Barrett as their leader. This group, later referring to itself as the Nexus, made Cena lose the WWE Championship to Sheamus at Fatal 4-Way on June 20, as well as their steel cage match on July 18 at Money in the Bank. Cena formed an alliance with Edge, Chris Jericho, John Morrison, R-Truth, Bret Hart, and former Nexus member Daniel Bryan to defeat the Nexus at SummerSlam on August 15. At Night of Champions on September 19, Cena was eliminated by Barrett in a six-pack challenge elimination match for the WWE Championship.

At Hell in a Cell on October 3, Cena faced Barrett with the stipulations that if he were to lose, he would join the Nexus, and if he were to win, the Nexus would disband. Cena lost to Barrett and reluctantly joined the Nexus. On October 24, Cena and fellow Nexus member David Otunga defeated Rhodes and Drew McIntyre to win the WWE Tag Team Championship at Bragging Rights. Later that night, Cena was forced to help Barrett defeat Orton in a WWE Championship match; Barrett won by disqualification, but not the title. The next night on Raw, Cena and Otunga lost the titles to fellow Nexus members Heath Slater and Justin Gabriel when Barrett ordered Otunga to lie down and lose the titles.

At Survivor Series on November 21, Cena officiated another WWE Championship match between Barrett and Orton; per stipulation (Loser Leaves Town match), if Barrett did not win the championship, Cena would be "fired" from the WWE. Cena was fired (kayfabe) after Orton retained against Barrett. The next night on Raw, Cena gave a farewell speech before again costing Barrett the title by interfering in his rematch with Orton. A week later, Cena invaded Raw, first as a spectator, but then attacked members of the Nexus, explaining he would still take them down one by one despite not being employed. On the December 13 episode of Raw, Cena was rehired by Barrett in exchange that he would face him on December 19 at TLC: Tables, Ladders & Chairs in a chairs match, which Cena won.

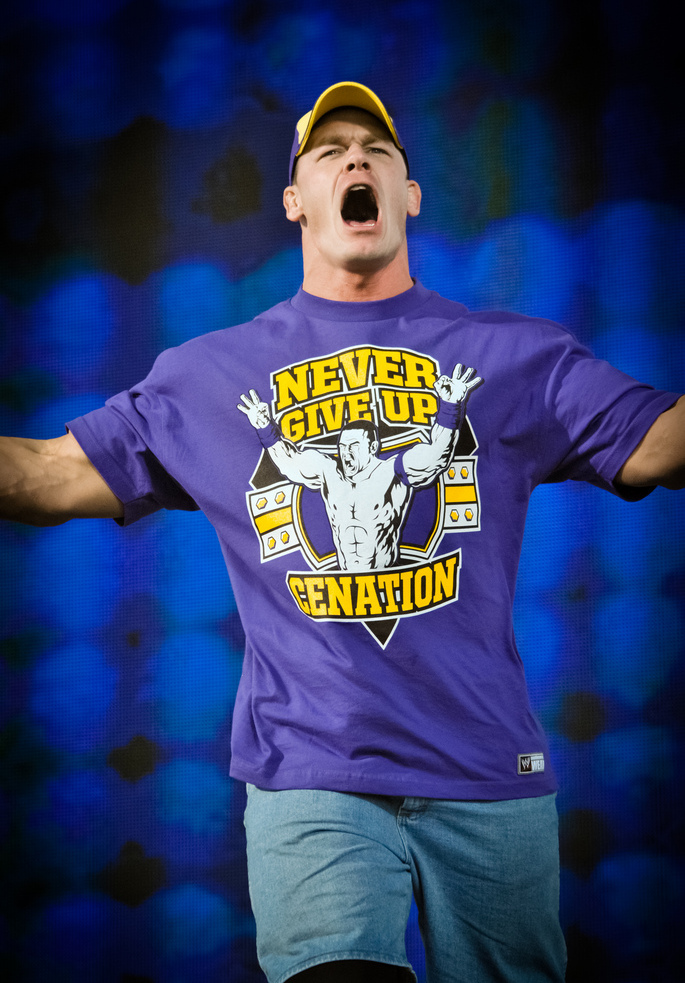
Cena at WWE Tribute to the Troops in December 2010

On the January 17, 2011, episode of Raw, Cena faced CM Punk, who had assumed leadership of the Nexus and renamed the stable as the New Nexus, in a match which ended in a no contest after Cena was attacked by the debuting Mason Ryan, who later joined the New Nexus. Cena competed in the Royal Rumble match on January 30, which saw Cena eliminate most of the members of the New Nexus, ending their feud. Cena was eliminated by WWE Champion the Miz, who was not part of the match. Cena won an Elimination Chamber match against CM Punk, John Morrison, King Sheamus, Randy Orton, and R-Truth at Elimination Chamber on February 20 to face the Miz at WrestleMania XXVII for the WWE Championship.

==== Feuds with the Rock and CM Punk (2011–2013) ====
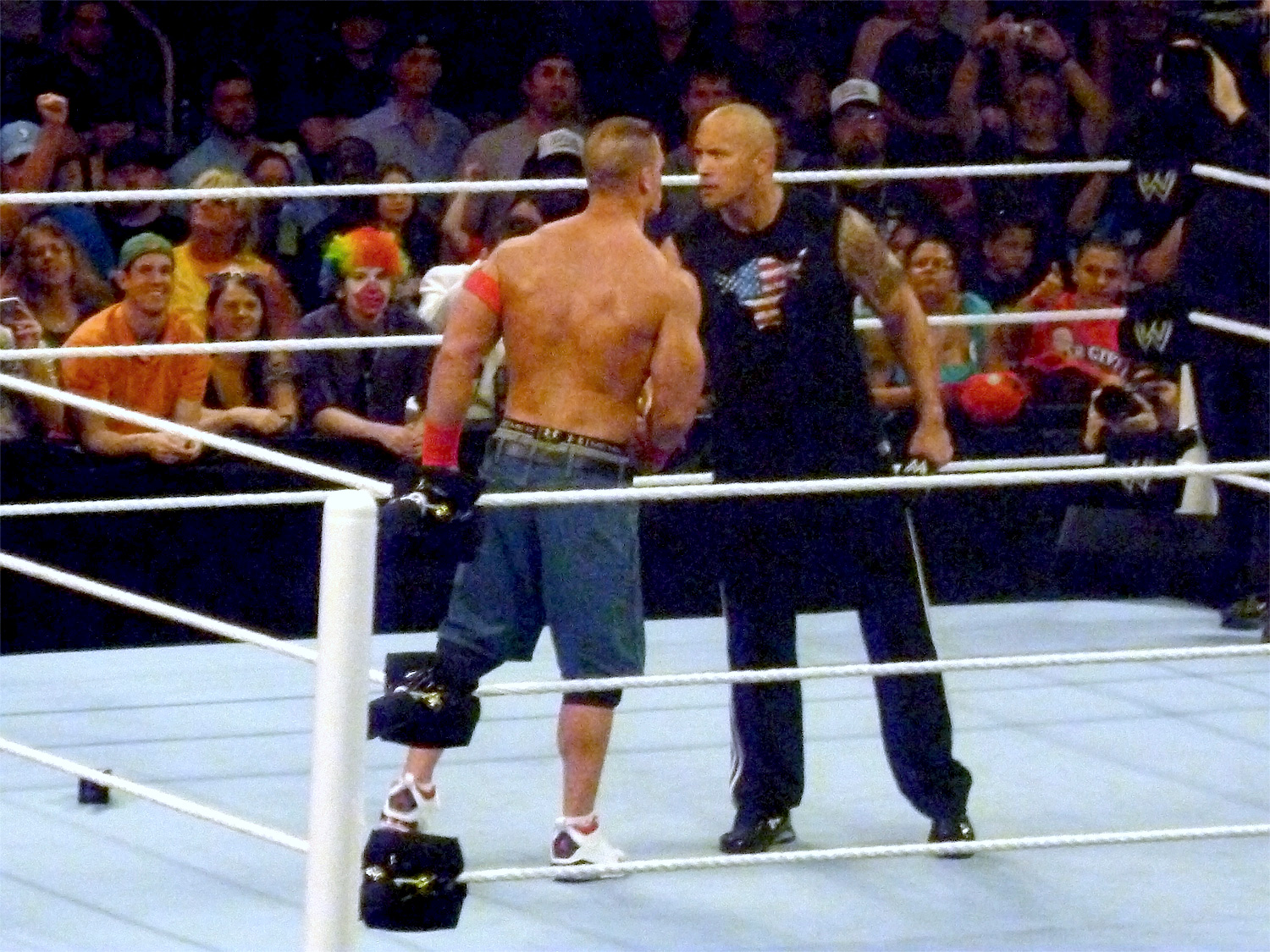
Cena and the Rock agree to face each other at WrestleMania XXVIII in April 2011.

On Raw after Elimination Chamber, Cena replied in rap form to comments made by the Rock the previous week, as he returned as the announced guest host of WrestleMania. That night, Cena and the Miz defeated Slater and Gabriel to become WWE Tag Team Champions, but their rematch clause was immediately invoked and they lost the titles after the Miz attacked Cena. After weeks of insults, Cena and the Rock finally met on the March 28 episode of Raw, where, after a verbal confrontation and brief attack by the Miz and Alex Riley, Cena attacked the Rock with the Attitude Adjustment. At WrestleMania on April 3, Cena and the Miz fought to a double countout, but the Rock restarted the match and performed a Rock Bottom on Cena, allowing the Miz to retain the title. The next night on Raw, Cena, in response to the Rock "screwing" him out of the title, agreed to face him in the main event of WrestleMania XXVIII, marking the first WrestleMania match set up one year in advance.

At Extreme Rules on May 1, Cena defeated the Miz and Morrison in a triple threat steel cage match to become WWE Champion. Cena retained the title against the Miz on May 22 at Over the Limit in an "I Quit" match, and R-Truth on June 19 at Capitol Punishment. After CM Punk announced he was leaving the company due to his contract expiring after Money in the Bank on July 17, he defeated Cena for the WWE Championship, leaving with the title. Dave Meltzer of the Wrestling Observer Newsletter awarded the match five stars, Cena's first five star match. On July 25, after Rey Mysterio won the title in a tournament, Cena challenged and defeated him for the title later that night, only to be interrupted by Punk, who also claimed to be champion. Cena lost to Punk at SummerSlam on August 14 in a championship unification match. At Night of Champions on September 18, Cena defeated Alberto Del Rio for his tenth WWE Championship, but lost it back to Del Rio at Hell in a Cell on October 2 in a triple threat Hell in a Cell match also involving Punk. Cena lost his rematch to Del Rio at Vengeance on October 23 in a Last Man Standing match due to interference by the Awesome Truth (the Miz and R-Truth). After weeks of them attacking Cena and employees, Cena was allowed to choose his partner to face them on November 20 at Survivor Series. He chose the Rock as his partner, and they defeated Miz and Truth; after the match, the Rock gave Cena a Rock Bottom.

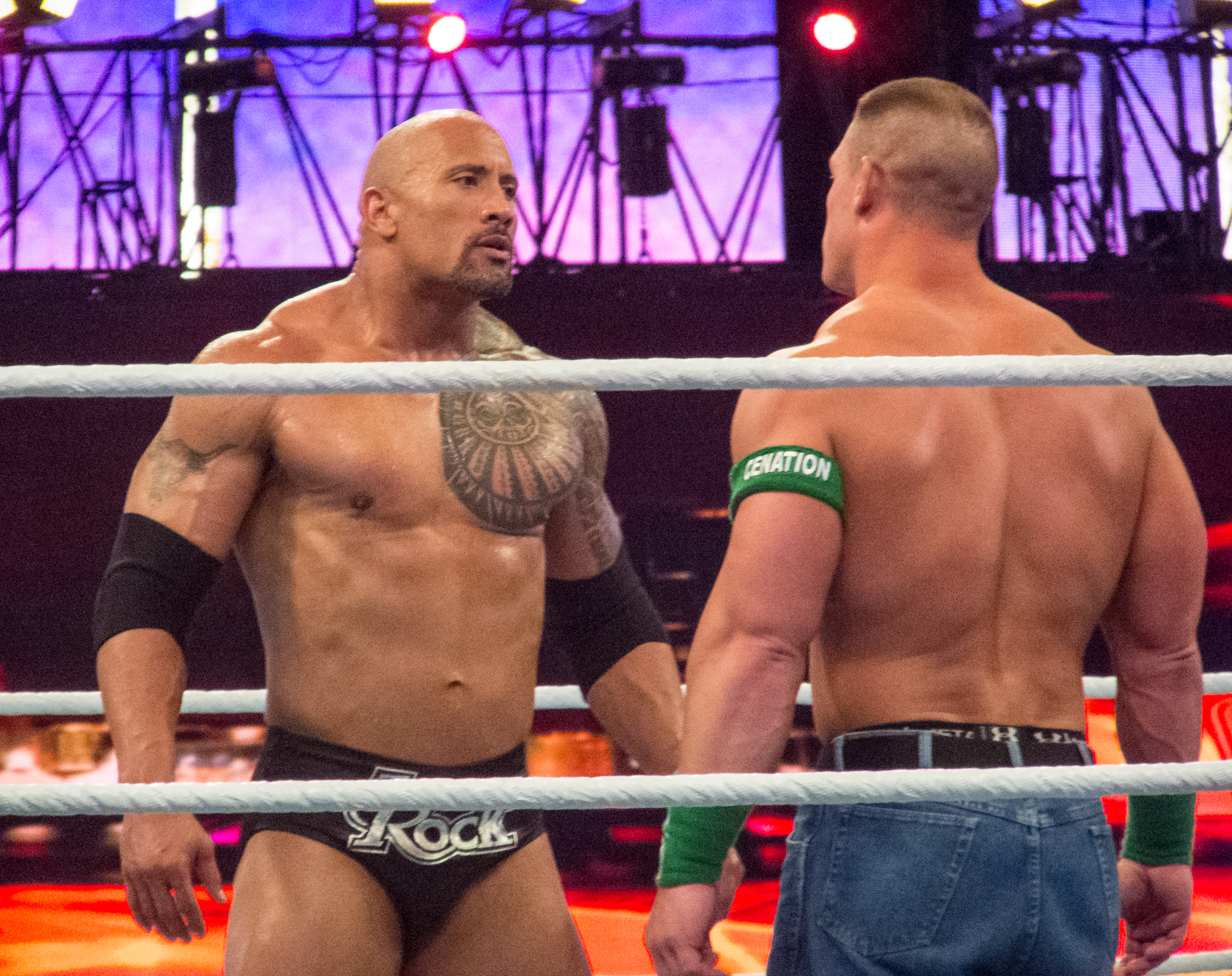
Cena and the Rock face off at WrestleMania XXVIII in April 2012.

Cena briefly feuded with Kane, who he fought to a double countout at Royal Rumble on January 29, 2012, and defeated in an Ambulance match on February 19 at Elimination Chamber. On March 19, Cena was involved in a three-car accident in Philadelphia, but suffered no severe injuries. At WrestleMania XXVIII on April 1, Cena lost to the Rock in the main event after attempting to hit the People's Elbow on the Rock, who countered with a Rock Bottom for the pinfall.

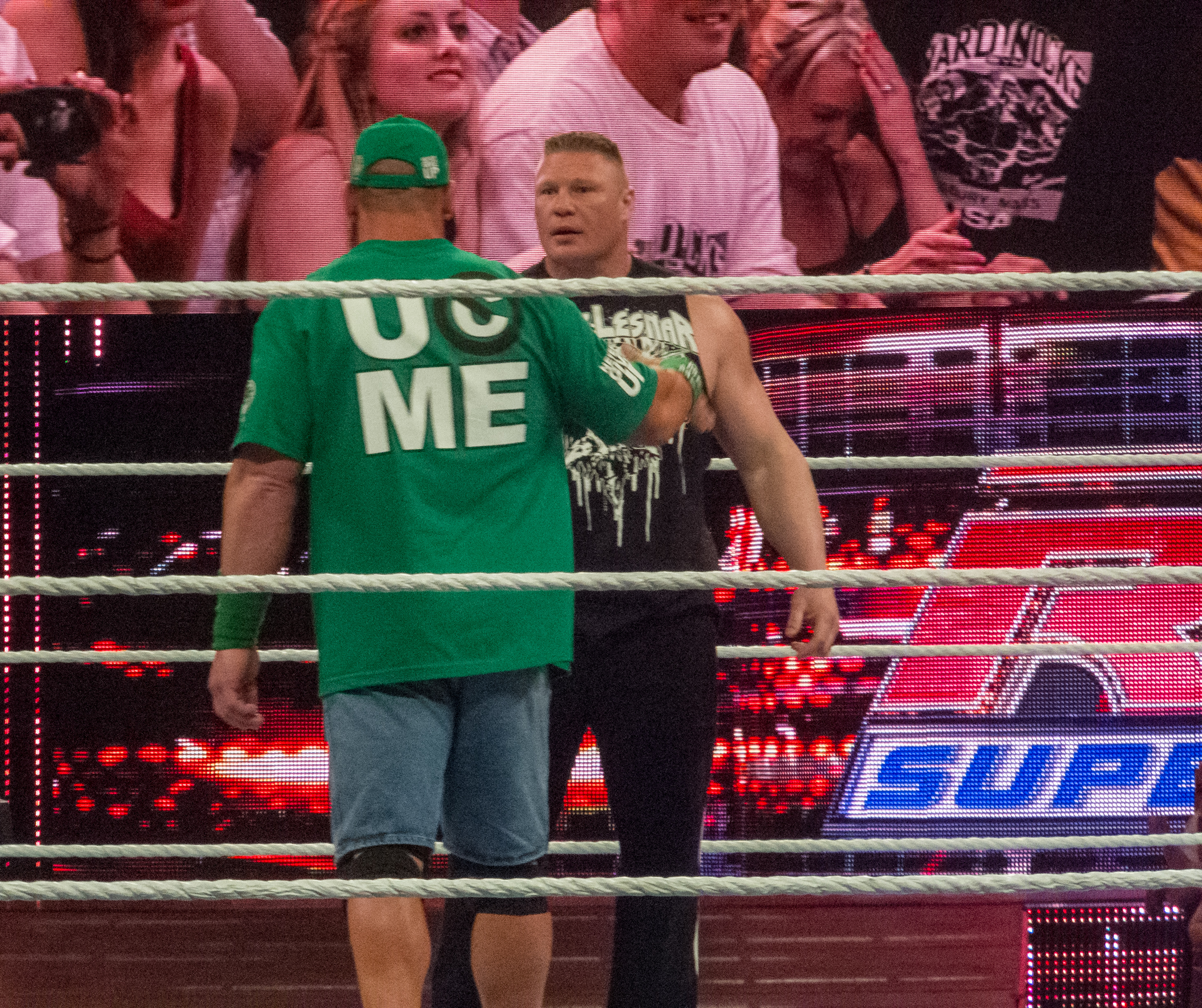
Brock Lesnar faces off with Cena after his return in April 2012.

The following night on Raw SuperShow, Cena invited the Rock to the ring to congratulate him on his victory, however, his call was answered instead by the returning Brock Lesnar, who attacked Cena with an F-5. Raw and SmackDown General Manager John Laurinaitis revealed that he signed Lesnar to bring "legitimacy" to the WWE and for him to become its "new face". At Extreme Rules on April 29, Cena defeated Lesnar in an Extreme Rules match. At Over the Limit on May 20, Big Show helped Laurinaitis defeat Cena, but he was fired at No Way Out on June 17 after Cena defeated Big Show in a steel cage match with both their jobs on the line. Cena won the WWE Championship Money in the Bank ladder match at Money in the Bank on July 15, earning a contract for a shot at the WWE Championship anytime within a year. At Raw 1000 on July 23, Cena cashed in his contract on Punk and won by disqualification after Big Show interfered, becoming the first person to cash in a Money in the Bank contract and not win a title. Cena failed to win the title from Punk in a triple threat match involving Big Show at SummerSlam on August 19, and fought him to a draw at Night of Champions on September 16. After being sidelined with a legitimate arm injury, Cena was pinned by Punk in a triple threat match involving Ryback at Survivor Series on November 18. He then feuded with Dolph Ziggler over an alleged relationship with AJ Lee and lost to Ziggler in a ladder match at TLC: Tables, Ladders & Chairs on December 16 for his World Heavyweight Championship Money in the Bank contract, after AJ turned on Cena. Cena defeated Ziggler on the January 7 and 14 episodes of Raw despite interferences from AJ and Big E Langston, ending the feud.

On January 27, 2013, Cena won his second Royal Rumble match, announcing that he would pursue the WWE Championship at WrestleMania 29. At Elimination Chamber on February 17, Cena, Ryback and Sheamus lost to the Shield (Dean Ambrose, Roman Reigns, and Seth Rollins). On the February 25 episode of Raw, Cena defeated Punk to retain his number one contendership to the WWE Championship. At WrestleMania on April 7, Cena defeated the Rock in their rematch to win his eleventh WWE Championship. Cena then began a rivalry with Ryback and suffered a legitimate achilles tendon injury, but retained the title in a Last Man Standing match (which ended in a no contest) at Extreme Rules on May 19, and then won a Three Stages of Hell match on June 16 at Payback. He defeated Mark Henry via submission to retain the title on July 14 at Money in the Bank. At SummerSlam on August 18, Cena lost the WWE Championship to Daniel Bryan with Triple H as the special guest referee, ending his reign at 133 days. The following night on Raw, Cena announced he would undergo surgery for a triceps tear and would be out for four to six months.

==== World championship pursuits and reigns (2013–2015) ====
Cena returned at Hell in a Cell on October 27, defeating Del Rio to win his third World Heavyweight Championship. He retained the title against Del Rio on November 24 at Survivor Series. Cena next challenged then-WWE Champion Randy Orton to unify their respective championships, leading to a Tables, Ladders and Chairs title unification match at TLC: Tables, Ladders & Chairs on December 15, which Cena lost. Cena failed to win the now-unified WWE World Heavyweight Championship from Orton at Royal Rumble on January 26, 2014, and in the Elimination Chamber match at the titular event on February 23 after being distracted by the Wyatt Family.

I know how John Cena feuds tend to work. He loses one match, then wins the next two or three. Look at Rusev and Bray Wyatt as examples. These feuds don't really help talent. They're established... as definitively below Cena. This is a running theme in WWE booking. [Kevin] Owens is ... worse off than he would have been if he had never had the second and third matches with Cena.

— Pro Wrestling Dot Net analyst Will Pruett in July 2015

Following the event, Bray Wyatt accepted Cena's challenge for a match at WrestleMania XXX on April 6 to prove that Cena's heroic act was a façade characteristic of "this era of lies" and turn Cena into a "monster". At WrestleMania, Cena defeated Wyatt despite interference from Luke Harper and Erick Rowan. The feud continued based on the story that Wyatt was capturing Cena's fanbase, exemplified by Wyatt leading a children's choir to the ring on the April 28 episode of Raw, where they later donned sheep masks. At Extreme Rules on May 4, Wyatt defeated Cena in a steel cage match after repeated interference from the rest of the Wyatt Family members and a demonic child. At Payback on June 1, Cena defeated Wyatt in a Last Man Standing match after burying him under multiple equipment cases, ending their feud.

At Money in the Bank on June 29, Cena won the ladder match for the vacant WWE World Heavyweight Championship. He retained the title at Battleground on July 20 in a fatal four-way match against Orton, Kane and Reigns. At SummerSlam on August 17, Cena lost the title to Lesnar in a squash match after sixteen suplexes and two F-5s, ending his reign at 49 days. In their rematch at Night of Champions on September 21, he failed to regain the title after Rollins attacked him, causing a disqualification. At Hell in a Cell on October 26, Cena defeated Orton in a Hell in a Cell match to become the number one contender for the championship.

The next night on Raw, Cena rejected the Authority's offer to join forces, resulting in a 5-on-5 Survivor Series elimination tag match between Team Cena (Cena, Ziggler, Rowan, Big Show, and Ryback) and Team Authority (Rollins, Kane, Harper, Henry, and Rusev) at Survivor Series on November 23. Big Show turned on Cena, causing his elimination, but Ziggler won the match for Team Cena with the interfering Sting's help. Per the stipulation, The Authority were stripped from power and only Cena could bring them back. At TLC: Tables, Ladders & Chairs on December 14, Cena defeated Rollins in a tables match to retain his number one contendership to the WWE World Heavyweight Championship and face Lesnar for the title at Royal Rumble. On the December 29 episode of Raw, Rollins and Big Show held guest host Edge hostage, forcing Cena to reinstate The Authority, who added Rollins to his title match and "fired" Ziggler, Ryback and Rowan for joining Team Cena. He won their jobs back by defeating Rollins, Big Show and Kane in a handicap match. At Royal Rumble on January 25, 2015, Cena was unsuccessful in capturing the title.

==== United States Champion (2015–2016) ====
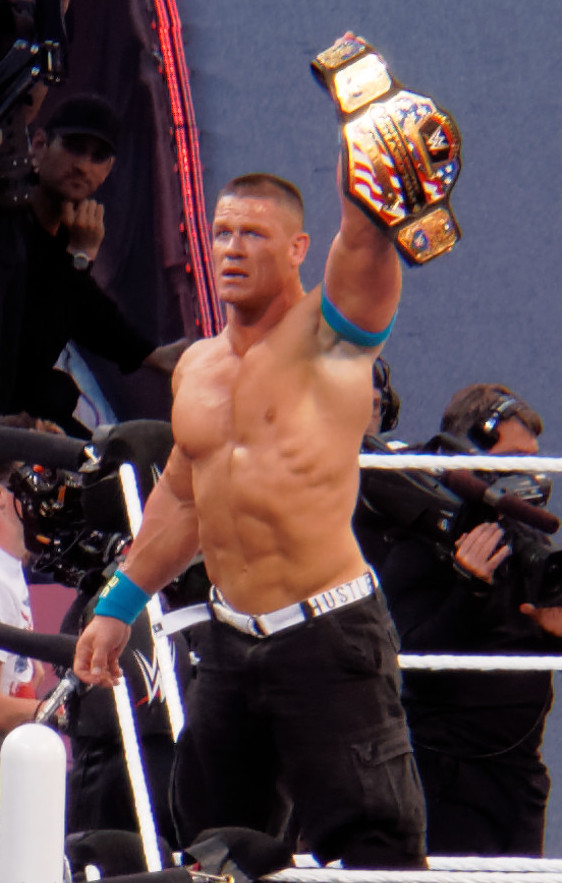
Cena after defeating Rusev for the United States Championship at WrestleMania 31 in April 2015

Cena then began feuding with United States Champion Rusev and failed to win the title at Fastlane on February 22, when he passed out from Rusev's submission, the Accolade, after Rusev hit Cena with a low blow following a distraction by his manager Lana. Cena challenged Rusev to a rematch, which was declined, and Stephanie McMahon decreed that Cena would not compete at WrestleMania 31 unless Rusev agreed to a rematch. On the March 9 episode of Raw, Cena attacked Rusev, refusing to release the STF submission hold, causing Lana to grant Cena the match. Cena defeated Rusev at WrestleMania on March 29 to win his fourth United States Championship, marking Rusev's first pinfall loss in the main roster. He issued weekly open challenges for the title, culminating in successful defenses against the likes of Dean Ambrose, Stardust, Bad News Barrett, Kane, Sami Zayn, Neville, Zack Ryder, and Cesaro. He retained his title against Rusev in a Russian Chain match on April 26 at Extreme Rules, and an "I Quit" match on May 17 at Payback, ending their feud. The following night on Raw, Cena was attacked by then-NXT Champion Kevin Owens, setting up a Champion vs. Champion match at Elimination Chamber on May 31, which Owens won. Cena defeated Owens at Money in the Bank on June 14 and at Battleground on July 19 to retain the United States Championship and end their feud.

Cena resumed his feud with then-WWE World Heavyweight Champion Seth Rollins, with Rollins refusing Cena's challenges for the title. On the July 27 episode of Raw, the Authority forced him to defend the title against Rollins, successfully doing so despite suffering a legitimate broken nose. At SummerSlam on August 23, Cena lost to Rollins in a "Winner Takes All" match for both the WWE World Heavyweight Championship and the United States Championship after guest host Jon Stewart attacked him with a steel chair, ending his reign at 147 days. He won his fifth United States Championship from Rollins on September 20 at Night of Champions (a record in the WWE ownership era of the title), defeating him to retain the title the next night on Raw and in a steel cage match on October 3 at WWE Live from Madison Square Garden. Cena also resumed his open challenges for the title, which he lost to the returning Alberto Del Rio at Hell in a Cell on October 25. He underwent shoulder surgery on January 7, sidelining him for an undisclosed length of time.

==== Feud with AJ Styles (2016–2017) ====
Cena returned at WrestleMania 32 on April 3, 2016, helping the Rock fend off the Wyatt Family. Cena made his full return on the Memorial Day edition of Raw on May 30, four months earlier than had been expected for his type of injury. He was confronted by AJ Styles, who betrayed Cena when he joined his former The Club teammates Luke Gallows and Karl Anderson in attacking him. On June 19, at Money in the Bank, Cena lost to Styles after interference from Gallows and Anderson. At Battleground on July 24, Cena, Enzo Amore and Big Cass defeated the Club in a six-man tag team match after Cena pinned Styles. During the 2016 WWE draft on July 19, Cena was drafted to the SmackDown brand. At SummerSlam on August 21, Cena again lost to Styles. With Styles later winning the renamed WWE World Championship, Cena challenged him and Dean Ambrose in a triple threat match for the title on October 9 at No Mercy, but lost after being pinned by Styles, which came after Ambrose and Cena simultaneously made Styles submit, therefore restarting the match. Cena took a sabbatical from WWE to film American Grit season 2.

On January 29, 2017, Cena defeated Styles at Royal Rumble to win the WWE Championship and tie Ric Flair for the most recognized world title reigns at 16. (Note: Although Ric Flair has won more world championships, several of these reigns are unrecognized by WWE, with the number 16 having been called "WWE mythology".) He lost the title in an Elimination Chamber match at the titular event on February 12 to Bray Wyatt, and failed to regain it two nights later on SmackDown Live in a triple threat match also featuring Styles. Cena then began a feud with the Miz, with the Miz accusing Cena of being a hypocrite because of his movie commitments, while Cena accused the Miz of stealing other wrestlers' moves and personalities. the Miz's wife Maryse then slapped Cena before Cena and his then-girlfriend Nikki Bella sent the Miz and Maryse retreating. Cena and Bella defeated them in a mixed tag team match at WrestleMania 33 on April 2, after which Cena proposed marriage to Bella, which she accepted.

==== Part-time performer (2017–2024) ====
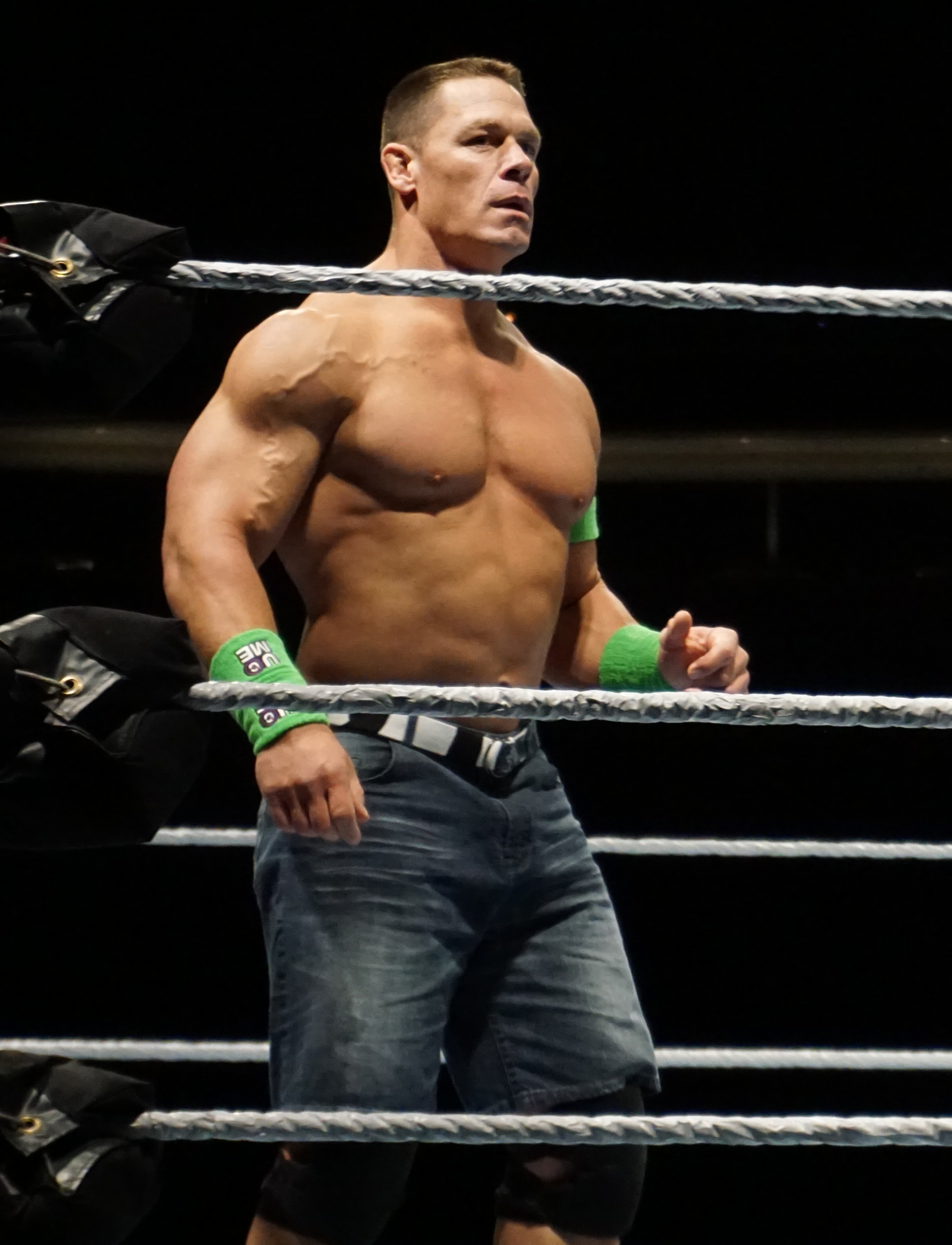
Cena in March 2018

In July 2017, WWE dubbed Cena a "free agent" during the Superstar Shake-up, meaning he could work for both the Raw and SmackDown WWE brands. Cena defeated Rusev in a flag match at Battleground on July 23, Baron Corbin at SummerSlam on August 20, and lost to Roman Reigns on September 24 at No Mercy. Cena returned to SmackDown the next month after Commissioner Shane McMahon named him as the final member of Team SmackDown for the men's 5-on-5 elimination match against Team Raw at Survivor Series on November 19; Cena was eliminated by Kurt Angle and Team SmackDown was defeated.

Cena failed to win the Royal Rumble on January 28, 2018, an Elimination Chamber match to determine the number one contender for the WWE Universal Championship on February 25 at the titular event, and a six-pack challenge for the WWE Championship on March 11 at Fastlane. On April 8 at WrestleMania 34, Cena was quickly defeated by the Undertaker. He defeated Triple H on April 27 at the Greatest Royal Rumble, and teamed with Bobby Lashley to defeat Elias and Owens at Super Show-Down on October 6. He was scheduled for a match at Crown Jewel in Saudi Arabia on November 2, but refused to work the event following the assassination of Jamal Khashoggi.

Cena returned to WWE television on the January 1, 2019 episode of SmackDown, where he and Becky Lynch defeated Andrade Cien Almas and Zelina Vega in a mixed tag team match. On the January 14 episode of Raw, Cena lost to Finn Bálor in a fatal four-way match also involving Drew McIntyre and Corbin to determine the number one contender for the Universal Championship at Royal Rumble. Cena was scheduled to compete in the Royal Rumble on January 27, but was taken out due to an in-storyline ankle injury supposedly suffered during the match. He appeared at WrestleMania 35 on April 7 in his "Doctor of Thuganomics" persona and interrupted Elias' concert, performing his finisher on Elias (calling it by its original name of the F-U) after insulting him. On the July 22 episode of Raw titled Raw Reunion, he engaged in a rap battle with the Usos.

Cena returned to WWE again on the February 28, 2020 episode of SmackDown, seemingly announcing his retirement before he was confronted by "the Fiend" Bray Wyatt, who challenged him to a match at WrestleMania 36, which Cena accepted. On Night 2 of WrestleMania on April 5, rather than a traditional wrestling match, the two fought in a surreal cinematic-style match called a Firefly Fun House match, showcasing moments from Cena's and Wyatt's history. Wyatt ultimately defeated Cena, after which his motionless body vanished from the middle of the ring. Due to the COVID-19 pandemic, Cena was unable to appear at WrestleMania 37, marking the first time he missed a WrestleMania in nearly 20 years, as he had wrestled or appeared at the event every year since his first appearance in 2003. At the time, Cena was in Canada filming the HBO Max series Peacemaker and could not travel to Tampa, Florida, for WrestleMania 37 without facing a two-week quarantine, which would have shut down production on the series. He made his return to WWE programming at Money in the Bank on July 18, 2021, confronting Roman Reigns after the latter retained his Universal Championship against Edge in the main event. After initially being scheduled to face Finn Bálor for the title, Cena hijacked a contract signing on the July 30 episode of SmackDown so he could challenge Reigns at SummerSlam on August 21, where Cena failed to win the title.

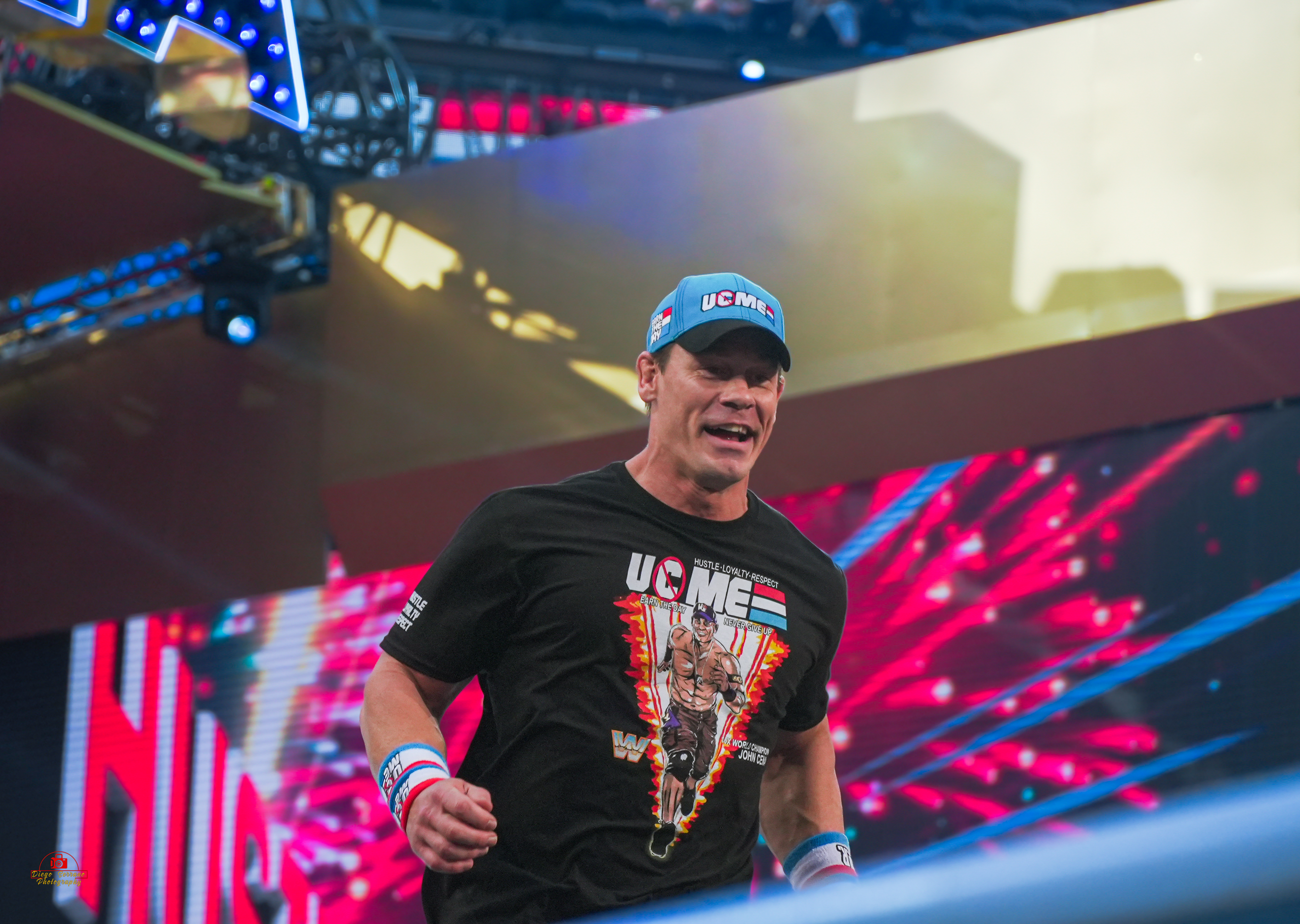
Cena making his entrance at WrestleMania 39 in April 2023

Cena returned on the June 27, 2022 episode of Raw, which marked the 20th anniversary of his main roster in-ring debut. He cut a promo recalling all his memories and thanking the fans for their support, also making appearances backstage with The Street Profits, Ezekiel, Theory, Seth "Freakin" Rollins, and Omos. On the December 30 episode of SmackDown, in his first SmackDown match since January 2019, Cena and Kevin Owens defeated the Bloodline's Reigns and Sami Zayn. On the March 6, 2023 episode of Raw, Cena accepted Theory's challenge for a United States Championship match at WrestleMania 39. On Night 1 of WrestleMania on April 1, Cena lost to Theory. At Money in the Bank on July 1, Cena made a surprise appearance and was confronted by Grayson Waller after Cena stated that WrestleMania should come to the United Kingdom. Waller then attacked Cena, who retaliated by hitting the Attitude Adjustment on Waller.

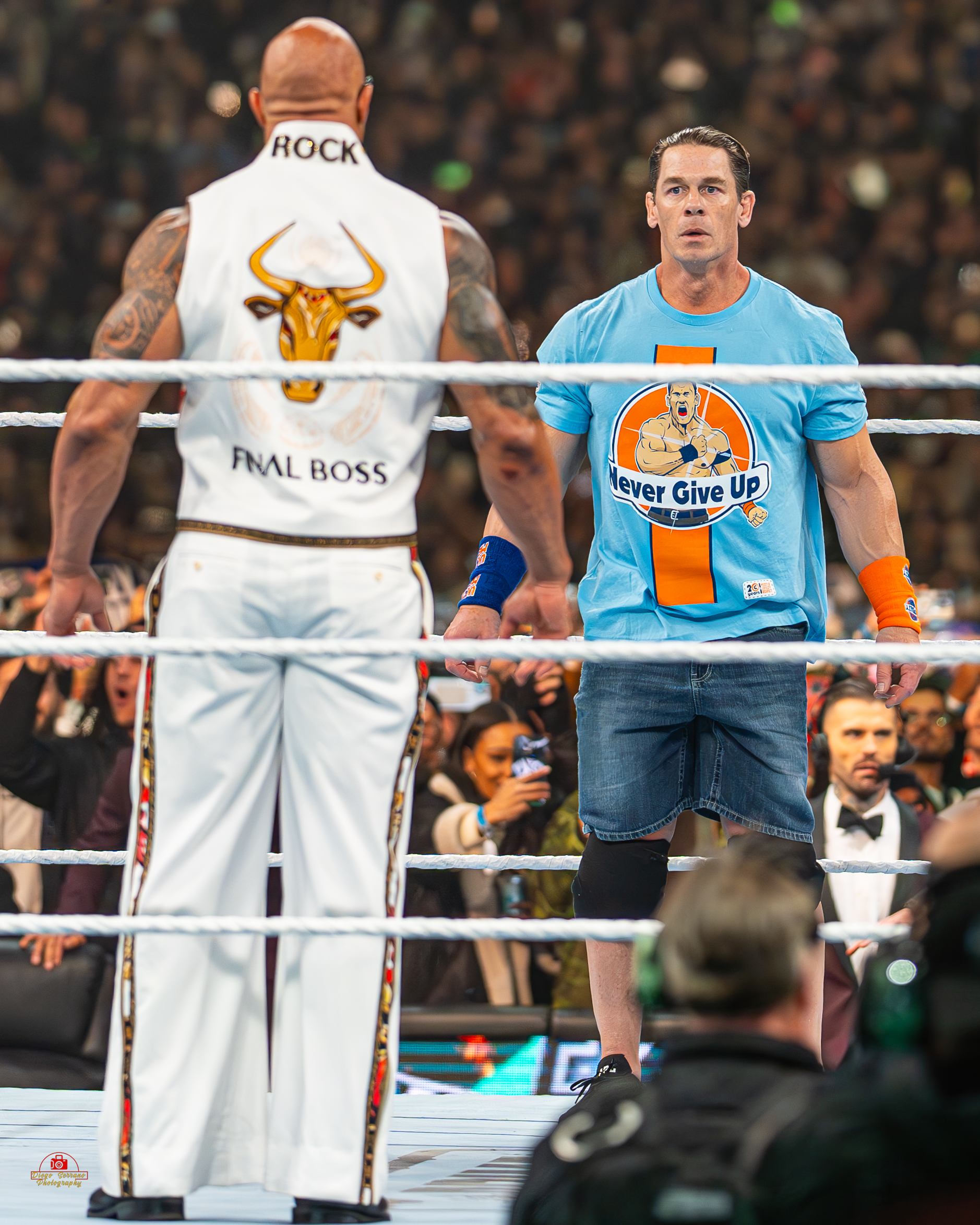
Cena face-to-face with the Rock at WrestleMania XL in April 2024

At Payback on September 2, Cena served as the host and special guest referee for the match between LA Knight and the Miz. On the September 15 episode of SmackDown, Cena was attacked on the Grayson Waller Effect by Jimmy Uso and his Bloodline partner Solo Sikoa, before AJ Styles saved Cena. They were set to sign a contract for a tag team match at Fastlane on October 7, but Styles was left unable to compete after a backstage assault from the Bloodline. Knight eventually signed a contract to join Cena in the match at Fastlane, which they won. Cena made his first appearance on WWE NXT on October 10, being in Carmelo Hayes' corner during Hayes' match against Bron Breakker. On the October 20 episode of SmackDown, Cena teased retirement before calling out anyone to face him, leading to Sikoa coming out and brawling with Cena, setting up a match between the two at Crown Jewel on November 4, which Cena lost after nine Samoan Spikes. On Night 2 of WrestleMania XL on April 7, 2024, Cena appeared during the main event between Cody Rhodes and Roman Reigns to aide Rhodes and take out both Sikoa and Reigns with the Attitude Adjustment. Afterwards, the Rock appeared and performed a Rock Bottom on Cena. The next night on Raw, Cena competed in his first match on Raw since January 2019, where he teamed with Raw Tag Team Champions Awesome Truth (the Miz and R-Truth) to defeat the Judgment Day members Finn Bálor, JD McDonagh, and Dominik Mysterio.

==== Retirement tour (2024–2025) ====
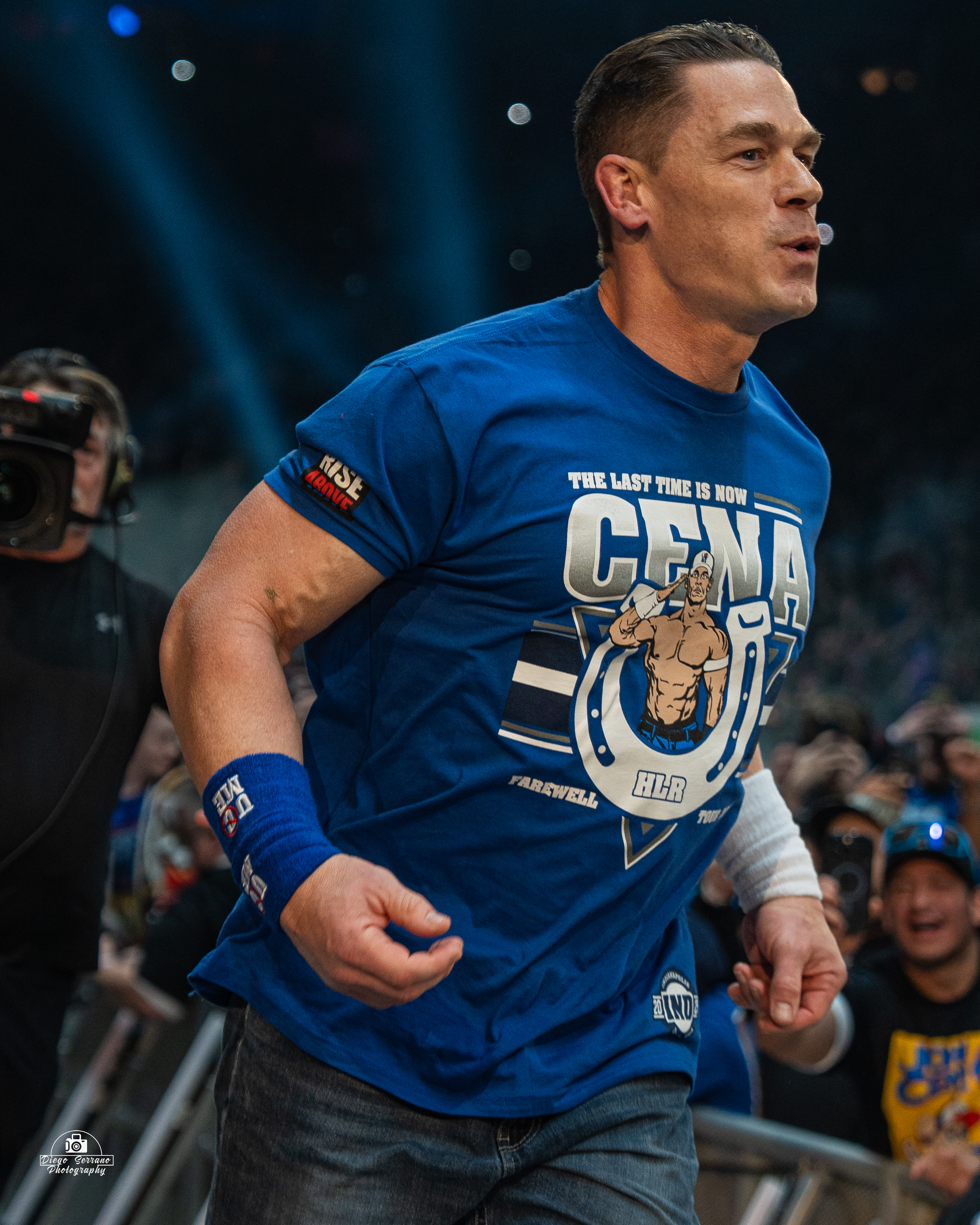
Cena entering his last Royal Rumble match at the Royal Rumble in February 2025

Cena made a surprise appearance at Money in the Bank on July 6, 2024, to announce his retirement from in-ring action at the end of 2025. At the Raw premiere on Netflix on January 6, 2025, Cena announced that he would compete at Royal Rumble on February 1 in the eponymous match, where he was the last man eliminated by Jey Uso. Cena won the Elimination Chamber match at the namesake event on March 1 by last eliminating CM Punk, tying Triple H's record for the most Elimination Chamber victories at four and earning an Undisputed WWE Championship match against Cody Rhodes at WrestleMania 41. Following the match, Cena viciously attacked Rhodes and aligned himself with The Rock and Travis Scott, turning heel for the first time since 2003. In subsequent appearances, Cena criticized the fans for their treatment of him over the years, vowing to "ruin" wrestling and retire as champion. In the main event of Night 2 of WrestleMania 41 on April 20, Cena defeated Rhodes with help from Travis Scott to win the Undisputed WWE Championship, becoming a record 17-time world champion.

On the Raw after WrestleMania 41, Cena was attacked by Randy Orton, setting up a title match at Backlash on May 10, where Cena defeated Orton to retain the title after a distraction from R-Truth. At the post-show press conference, Cena hit R-Truth with an Attitude Adjustment when the latter interrupted him, setting up a match between them at Saturday Night's Main Event XXXIX on May 24, which Cena won after a low blow. He later interfered in the main event between Jey Uso and Logan Paul for the World Heavyweight Championship, which Uso won with an assist from a returning Rhodes, setting up a tag team match between Cena and Paul against Rhodes and Uso at Money in the Bank on June 7, which Cena and Paul lost after interference from R-Truth. At Night of Champions on June 28, Cena defeated CM Punk to retain the title after interference from the Vision (Seth Rollins, Bron Breakker, and Bronson Reed).

On the July 18 episode of SmackDown, Cena was attacked by Rhodes, who had won the 2025 King of the Ring tournament to earn a title rematch at SummerSlam, and forced to sign the contract for a Street Fight after Cena had tried to back out of the match. On the August 1 episode of SmackDown, Cena reverted to a face by apologizing to the fans after admitting that he had realized his mistakes over the past five months after the Rock and Travis Scott had abandoned him. In the main event of Night 2 of SummerSlam on August 3, Cena lost the title back to Rhodes in a match that received widespread acclaim and was his second match to be rated five stars by Dave Meltzer, ending his final world championship reign at 105 days. Following the match, Cena was attacked by a returning Brock Lesnar. On August 31 at Clash in Paris, Cena defeated Logan Paul. In Cena's final SmackDown appearance as an in-ring performer on September 5, he challenged Sami Zayn for the WWE United States Championship. The match ended in a no-contest after Lesnar appeared and attacked both men. At Wrestlepalooza on September 20, Cena lost to Lesnar. At Crown Jewel on October 11, Cena defeated AJ Styles in what was his 100th victory at a WWE pay-per-view and livestreaming event, putting himself second in all-time wins at such events only behind the Undertaker.

At Saturday Night's Main Event XLI on November 1, it was announced that Cena's final opponent would be decided in the Last Time Is Now Tournament, beginning on the November 10 episode of Raw in Boston, Massachusetts, near Cena's hometown. On that episode of Raw, Cena defeated Dominik Mysterio to win the WWE Intercontinental Championship for the first and only time in his career, becoming a Triple Crown and a Grand Slam Champion in the process. In his final appearance on Raw as an in-ring performer on November 17, he teamed with Rey Mysterio and Sheamus to defeat the Judgment Day (Mysterio, Finn Bálor, and JD McDonagh). In his final pay-per-view match at Survivor Series: WarGames on November 29, Cena lost the title back to Mysterio after interferences from the Judgment Day, ending his reign at 19 days. At Saturday Night's Main Event XLII on December 13, 2025, Cena wrestled his final match, losing to the Last Time is Now Tournament winner Gunther via submission, officially ending his 26-year long career.

==== Post-retirement roles and appearances (2025–present) ====
Four days before his retirement match, Cena revealed on December 9, 2025, that he would be signing a five-year contract extension that would allow him to remain in WWE as an ambassador. In 2026, Cena would make appearances on both nights of WrestleMania 42 as the host for the event and at Backlash to announce the John Cena Classic, a competition that showcases present stars against future stars.

== Professional wrestling style and persona ==
=== In-ring style ===
Cena performing his finishing move, a fireman's carry slam known as the "Attitude Adjustment", on Kane in January 2012

Cena's original gimmick, known as the "Doctor of Thuganomics", portrayed a white rapper who wore jerseys, backwards hats, and a chain with a padlock around his neck. First as "the Prototype", and later under his real name, Cena sometimes used underhanded tactics to score victories, occasionally using his chain as a weapon behind the referee's back. He often rapped before his matches, insulting his opponents, events that happened in the media and the crowd. He also performed "rap battles", where he and his opponent took turns rapping on each other. In 2006, shortly after his debut film, The Marine, his wrestling character shifted from that of a rapper to a young military upstart, wearing dog tags and cargo shorts to the ring and also performing a salute to the crowd. Cena said in a 2011 interview with WWE.com that "every night when I do that salute, it's also a sign of respect to the men and women that don the uniform of the Armed Forces."

During WWE's change from TV-14 to TV-PG (the PG Era) in mid-2008, the name of Cena's finishing move, the "FU", was changed to the "Attitude Adjustment" and his finishing submission move, the "STFU", was renamed the "STF" to fit with WWE's new policies. During his career, he was known for ending his matches with a sequence of moves, dubbed the "Five Moves of Doom". The moves typically went in the following order: two flying shoulder blocks, protobomb, "Five Knuckle Shuffle", and "Attitude Adjustment".

Cena's signature ring gear included jean shorts, sneakers, wristbands, and armbands. He portrayed a heroic character throughout his WWE career, except for a villainous run from 2002 to 2003, and his heel turn at Elimination Chamber in 2025. Despite the initial positive reception to his heel turn, the execution of his villainous character had negative reception. Cena himself labeled his heel work as a failure, but also stated that he wouldn't change anything of his retirement tour. WrestleCrap named his heel turn and retirement tour as the worst thing in 2025. Wrestling Observer Newsletter gave 3 awards to Cena in 2025; although he won the Most Charismatic Award, he also won the Worst Gimmick for his heel turn and the Worst Match of the Year for his match against Cody Rhodes at WrestleMania 41.

During his career, Cena often wore a variety of T-shirts and baseball caps, which commonly include one of his catchphrases: "Never Give Up", "You Can't See Me", "Hustle, Loyalty, Respect", and "Respect. Earn it". He had a history of returning from both real and scripted injuries much sooner than expected. In April 2016, ESPN reporter David Shoemaker said: "Never underestimate Cena's recuperative abilities. He's somewhere on the recovery scale between German platelet-rich plasma therapy and Deadpool." Fellow wrestler Big Show said he felt most stable being lifted by Cena, despite Cena being over 200 lbs lighter and almost a foot shorter—a testament to Cena's functional strength.

=== Fashion ===
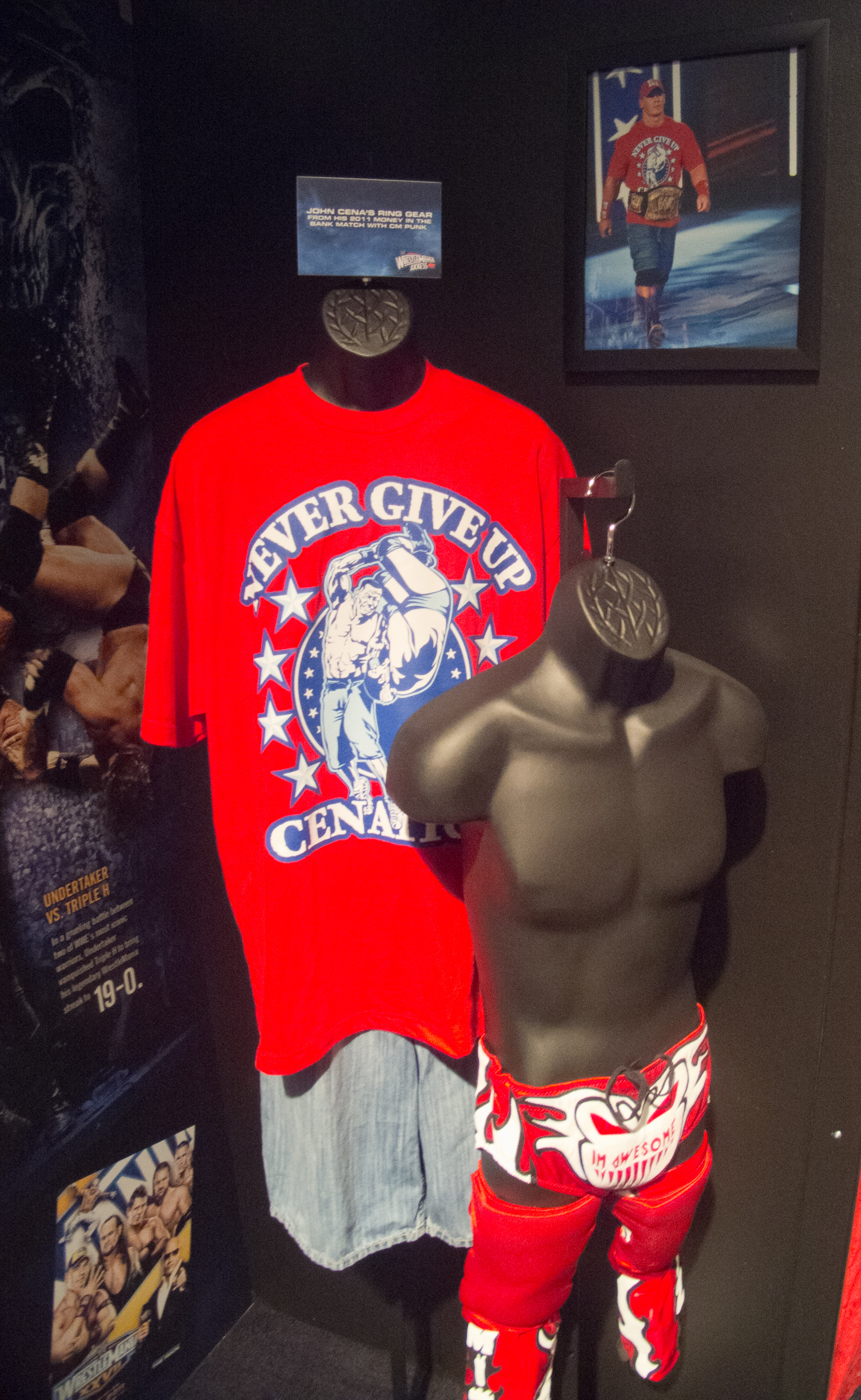
Cena's T-shirt (left) next to the Miz's ring gear (right) in 2012

During his WWE career, Cena has used his attire in an attempt to reflect the most current fashions and styling within the hip hop culture that his character represents. Cena started out wearing "throwback jerseys" and Reebok pumps until WWE produced specific Cena merchandise which he began wearing. While Cena was a member of the SmackDown brand, one of his WWE-produced T-shirts bore the suggestive spoonerism "Ruck Fules". Whenever it appeared on television, the image was censored, not by the network, but by WWE to sell more shirts under the premise that it was "too hot for TV". He also wore a chain with a large padlock, occasionally using it as a weapon, until WrestleMania 21, when it was replaced with a chromed and diamond studded (bling-bling) "Chain Gang" spinner medallion matching his spinner title belt. Around the time The Marine was released, Cena began wearing more military related attire, including camouflage shorts, dog tags, a Marine soldier cap, and a WWE produced shirt with the legend "Chain Gang Assault Battalion". Shortly after WrestleMania 23, when promotion for The Marine ended, the military attire diminished and was replaced with apparel bearing his new slogan "American Made Muscle" along with denim shorts, not seen since he was a member of the SmackDown roster. He then wore shirts that promoted Cenation and his trademark line "You Can't See Me".

== Legacy ==
Cena has routinely appeared in various top rankings, including top 20, top 25, and top 50, having won 17 world titles, more than any other wrestler in WWE, and being widely seen as the "face of WWE" for over a decade between the mid-2000s and the mid-2010s. Cena has been called the greatest professional wrestler of all time by his peers Kurt Angle, John "Bradshaw" Layfield, and veteran industry personality Paul Heyman.

Timothy Bella of The New York Times described Cena as "perhaps the last of the monocultural, crossover stars, following the likes of Hulk Hogan, 'Stone Cold' Steve Austin and the Rock." WWE chairman Vince McMahon said he regarded Cena as the WWE's Babe Ruth. Bleacher Report named Cena one of the 10 greatest WWE wrestlers of all time. Shawn Michaels's one hour long match on WWE Raw on April 23, 2007, against Cena is touted as one of the best matches in history, and Michaels said that after a fortnight WWE tour in the United Kingdom, he did not want to do the match with anyone else other than him. In 2012, WrestleMania XXVIII, headlined by the John Cena vs. the Rock main event, became the highest drawing event in WWE history with 1,217,000 buys. The event held the record for the highest grossing live event in WWE history in 2012, grossing $8.9 million, before being surpassed by WrestleMania 29 the following year, also headlined by Cena vs. Rock.

== Acting career ==
=== Film ===
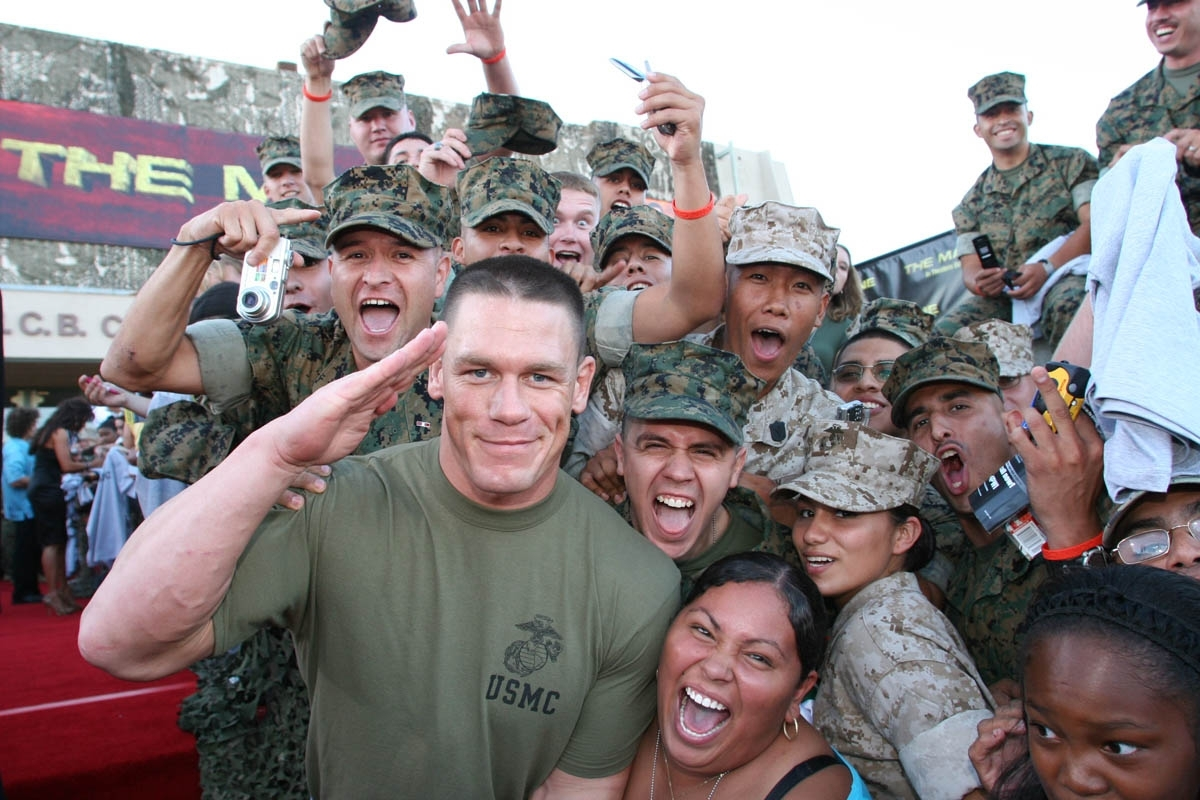
Cena with members of the United States Marine Corps at the premiere of his film The Marine in October 2006

WWE Studios, a division of WWE which produces and finances motion pictures, produced Cena's first movie—The Marine, which was distributed theatrically by 20th Century Fox America beginning on October 13, 2006. In its first week, the film made approximately US$7 million at the United States box office. After ten weeks in theaters, the film grossed $18.7 million. Once the film was released on DVD, it fared better, making $30 million in rentals in the first twelve weeks.

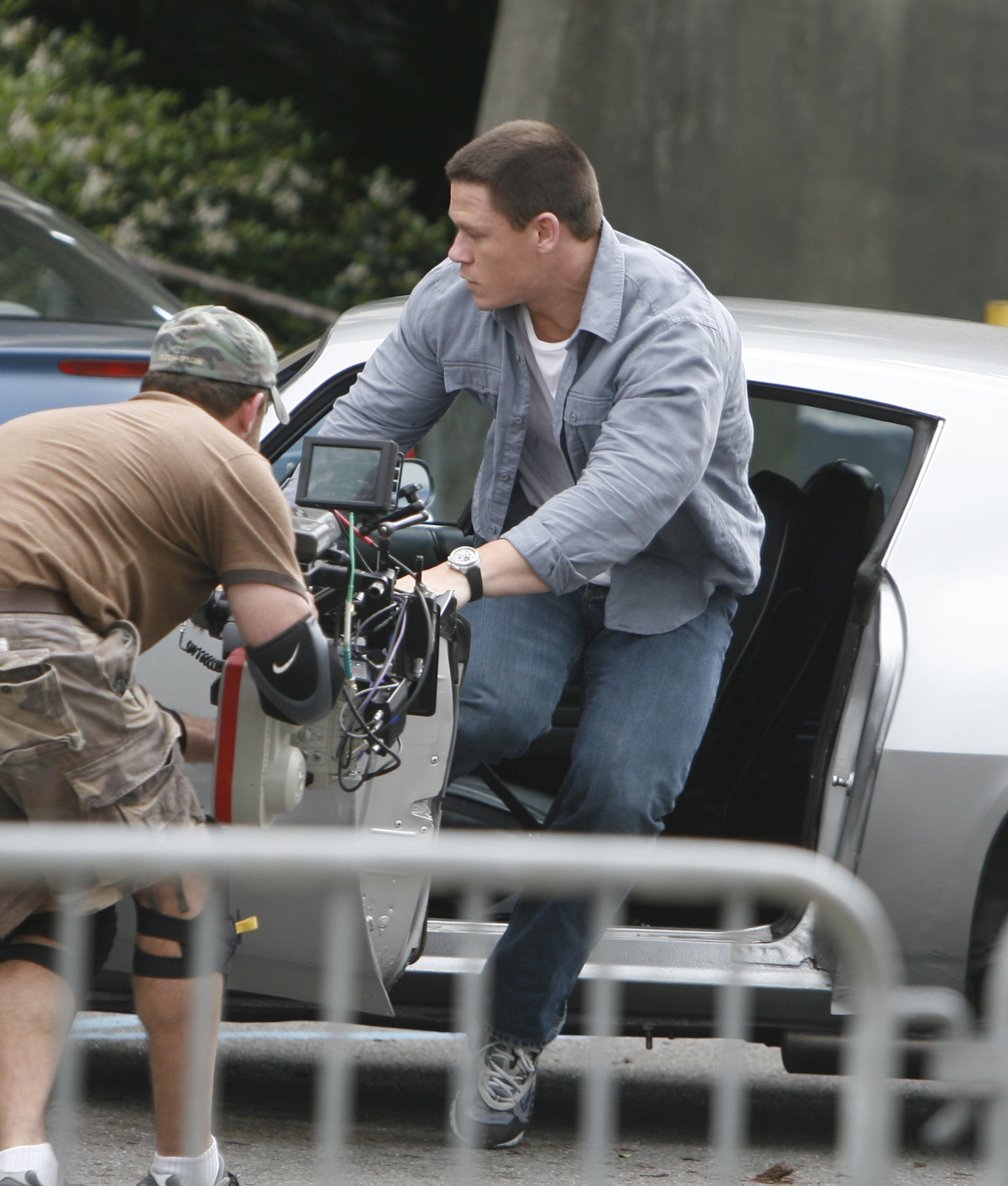
Cena filming on the set of 12 Rounds in March 2008

Cena's second film, 12 Rounds, was also produced by WWE Studios and distributed by 20th Century Fox. Filming began on February 25, 2008, in New Orleans; the film was released on March 27, 2009. Cena co-starred in his third film produced by WWE Studios, titled Legendary, which was played in selected theaters beginning on September 10, 2010, for a limited time. It was released on DVD on September 28. That same year, Cena starred in the children's film Fred: The Movie, a film based on Lucas Cruikshank's YouTube videos of the same name, where he plays Fred's imaginary father. The movie was first aired on Nickelodeon in September 2010.

In 2015, Cena made appearances in the comedy films Trainwreck, Sisters and a cameo in Daddy's Home. In 2017, Cena starred in the war drama The Wall, and lent his voice for the animated films Surf's Up 2: WaveMania and Ferdinand. He also appeared in Daddy's Home 2, reprising his role in a larger capacity than the 2015 film. In 2018, Cena starred in the comedy Blockers and had a leading role in the Transformers spin-off prequel, Bumblebee. In 2019, he starred in Playing with Fire, playing the role of smokejumper superintendent Jake Carson. In 2020, he voiced Yoshi, a polar bear, in the adventure comedy film Dolittle.

In 2019, Cena was cast in Justin Lin's F9, playing Jakob Toretto, the brother of Vin Diesel's character Dominic Toretto. During the film's promotional tour in 2021, Cena referred to Taiwan as "a country". He subsequently posted an apology on social media as China considers Taiwan a part of China. Cena also was cast as Christopher Smith / Peacemaker in James Gunn's The Suicide Squad, a role originally intended for Dave Bautista. In 2023, he reprised his role as Jakob Toretto in Fast X, which premiered in theaters on May 19. He was also the voice of Rocksteady in Teenage Mutant Ninja Turtles: Mutant Mayhem, which was released on August 2. He would later reprise his role as Peacemaker in a cameo appearance in the 2025 Superman film, also directed by Gunn.

=== Guest appearances ===
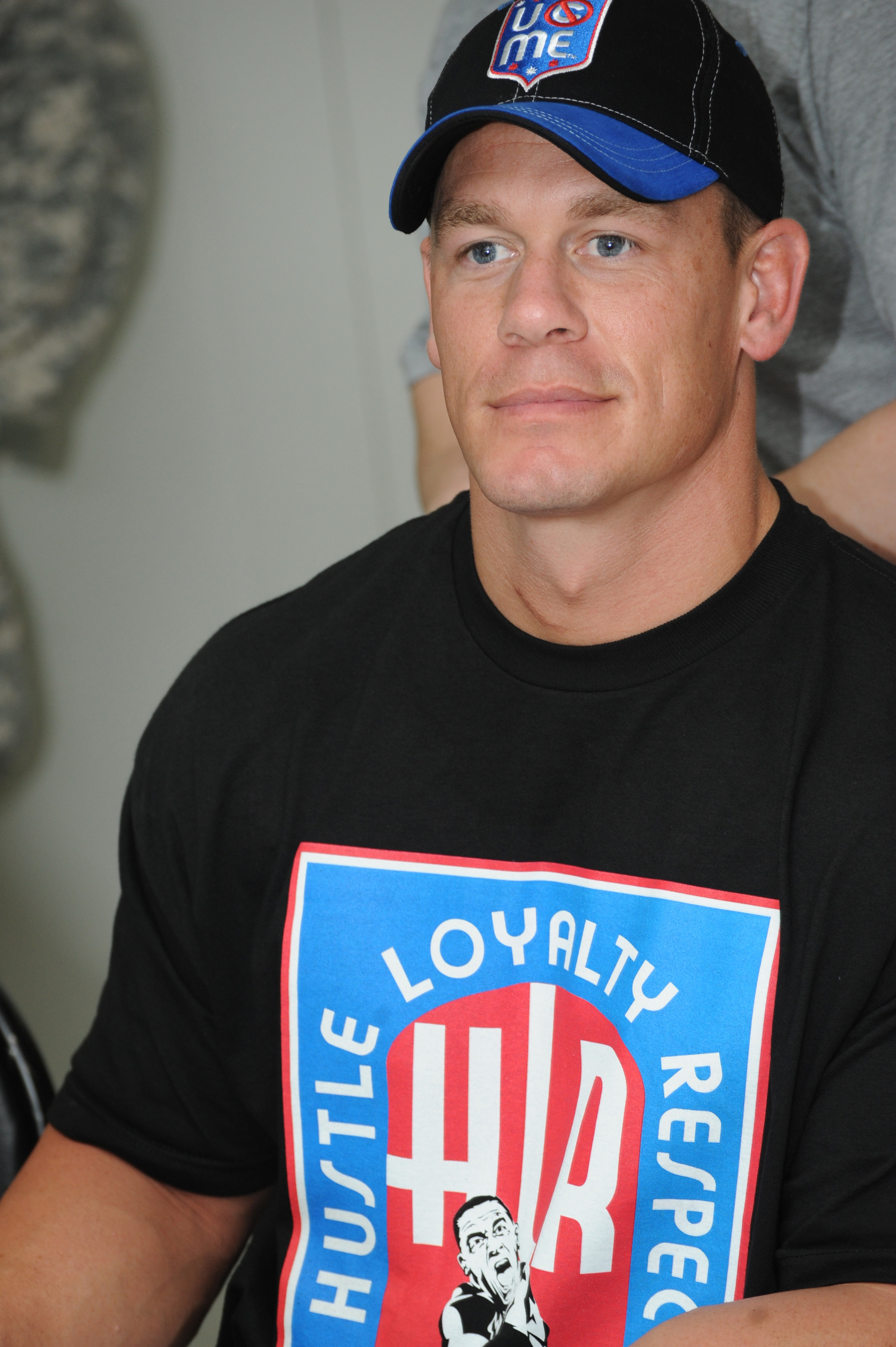
Cena in December 2008

Before his WWE debut, Cena made an appearance on the webcast Go Sick as Bruebaker, an angry, cursing wrestler in 2001. During his WWE career, Cena appeared on ABC's Jimmy Kimmel Live! three times. He has also appeared on morning radio shows including the CBS and XM versions of Opie and Anthony as part of their "walkover" on October 10, 2006. Other appearances have included NBC's Late Night with Conan O'Brien, Fuse's Celebrity Playlist, Fox Sports Net's The Best Damn Sports Show Period, FOX's MADtv, G4's Training Camp (with Shelton Benjamin), and two appearances on MTV's Punk'd (August 2006 and May 2007), as the victim of a practical joke. He also served as a co-presenter with Hulk Hogan at the 2005 Teen Choice Awards, as a guest judge during the third week of the 2006 season of Nashville Star, and appeared at the 2007 Nickelodeon UK Kids Choice Awards.

In January 2007, Cena, Batista, and Ashley Massaro appeared representing WWE on an episode of Extreme Makeover: Home Edition, giving the children of the family whose house was being renovated WWE merchandise and eight tickets to WrestleMania 23. Two months later, he and Bobby Lashley appeared on the NBC game show Deal or No Deal as "moral support" to longtime WWE fan and front row staple, Rick "Sign Guy" Achberger. Edge and Randy Orton also appeared as antagonists. On April 9, 2008, Cena, along with fellow wrestlers Triple H and Chris Jericho, appeared on the Idol Gives Back fund-raising special. In March 2009, Cena made an appearance on Saturday Night Live during the show's cold opening sequence. On March 7, he was a guest on NPR's quiz show Wait Wait... Don't Tell Me! in a Not My Job sequence titled "Sure, pro wrestling is a good gig, but when you win, do they throw teddy bears into the ring?".

=== Television ===
In 2001, between his training in Ultimate Pro Wrestling and Ohio Valley Wrestling, Cena was involved in the UPN produced reality show Manhunt, in which he portrayed Big Tim Kingman, leader of the group of bounty hunters who chased down the contestants who acted as fugitives; however, the show was mired in controversy when it was alleged that the portions of the show were rigged to eliminate certain players, scenes were re-shot or staged to enhance drama, and contestants read from scripts. Cena was featured on the ABC reality series Fast Cars and Superstars: The Gillette Young Guns Celebrity Race, which aired in June 2007, making it to the final round before being eliminated on June 24, placing third in the competition overall.

In 2007, Cena was interviewed for the CNN Special Investigations Unit documentary Death Grip: Inside Pro Wrestling, which focused on steroid and drug use in professional wrestling. When asked if he had taken steroids, he was heard to reply, "I can't tell you that I haven't, but you will never prove that I have." The day after the documentary aired, WWE accused CNN of taking Cena's comments out of context to present a biased point of view, backing up their claim by posting an unedited video of Cena answering the same question – filmed by WWE cameras from another angle – in which he is heard beginning the same statement with "absolutely not". A text interview on the website with Cena later had him saying the news outlet should apologize for misrepresenting him, which CNN refused, saying they felt the true answer to the question began with the phrase "my answer to that question". They edited the documentary on subsequent airings to include the "absolutely not".

Cena hosted the Australian Nickelodeon Kids' Choice Awards with Natalie Bassingthwaighte on October 11, 2008, in Melbourne. He guest starred as Ewan O'Hara, brother of Juliet O'Hara, in an episode of the fourth season of the comedy drama Psych. He also guest starred as himself in the seventh episode of Disney Channel's Hannah Montana Forever. On August 17, 2015, Cena guest co-hosted Today on NBC. Three nights later, Cena made an appearance on Late Night with Seth Meyers. Cena hosted two seasons of American Grit on Fox, a reality television series with 10 episodes. 16 men and women were split into four teams, where challenges were given. A US$1 million prize was given to the winning team. American Grit premiered on Fox on April 14, 2016, and the finale of season 1 aired on June 9. Cena hosted the ESPN ESPY Awards on July 13. On December 10, Cena was the guest host of Saturday Night Live on NBC.

On January 24, 2017, Nickelodeon announced that Cena would host the 2017 Nickelodeon Kids' Choice Awards ceremony on March 11. On January 11, 2018, it was announced that he would be hosting the awards ceremony again on March 24, becoming the third host behind Whitney Houston and Rosie O'Donnell to host the ceremony in back to back years. Two days later, the game show Keep It Spotless premiered with Cena as an executive producer. In addition, he was cast on Rise of the Teenage Mutant Ninja Turtles as the voice of the villain Baron Draxum. On February 14, 2019, it was announced that Cena would host a revival of Are You Smarter than a 5th Grader on the network, which premiered on June 10. In 2021, Cena co-hosted the TV game show Wipeout. In March 2024, an almost completely nude Cena appeared onstage at the 96th Academy Awards to present the award for best costume design in reference to a streaker interrupting the ceremony in 1974. In December 2025, Cena guest-starred in the sixth episode of the Apple TV television series Pluribus.

== Music career ==
In addition to his wrestling career, Cena is a rapper. He performed his fifth WWE theme song, "Basic Thuganomics", and it was featured on the WWE soundtrack album WWE Originals. He also recorded a song, "Untouchables", for the company's next soundtrack album WWE ThemeAddict: The Music, Vol. 6. He was featured on the remix for Murs's song "H-U-S-T-L-E", appearing in the video clip. Cena's debut album, You Can't See Me, was recorded with his cousin Tha Trademarc. It features, among other songs, his entrance theme, "The Time is Now", and the single "Bad, Bad Man" alongside Bumpy Knuckles, for which a music video was made that parodied 1980s culture, notably the television show The A-Team. A video was also made for the second single, "Right Now", that premiered on WWE Monday Night Raw on August 8, 2005. Cena and Tha Trademarc were later featured on a track by the Perceptionists called "Champion Scratch". Cena was featured on T-Boz's unreleased album, Still Cool.

In October 2014, Cena was featured on two songs with rapper Wiz Khalifa, "All Day" and "Breaks", as part of the soundtrack for the WWE 2K15 video game. Cena is a self-taught pianist, starting to learn the instrument in 2016. In 2022, he performed a piano rendition of Mötley Crüe's "Home Sweet Home" for the Peacemaker soundtrack, playing it onscreen as his Peacemaker character in a poignant scene to close the episode "Murn After Reading".

=== Discography ===
Studio albums

- You Can't See Me (2005)

Soundtrack albums

- Peacemaker (2022)

== Other ventures ==
=== Endorsements ===
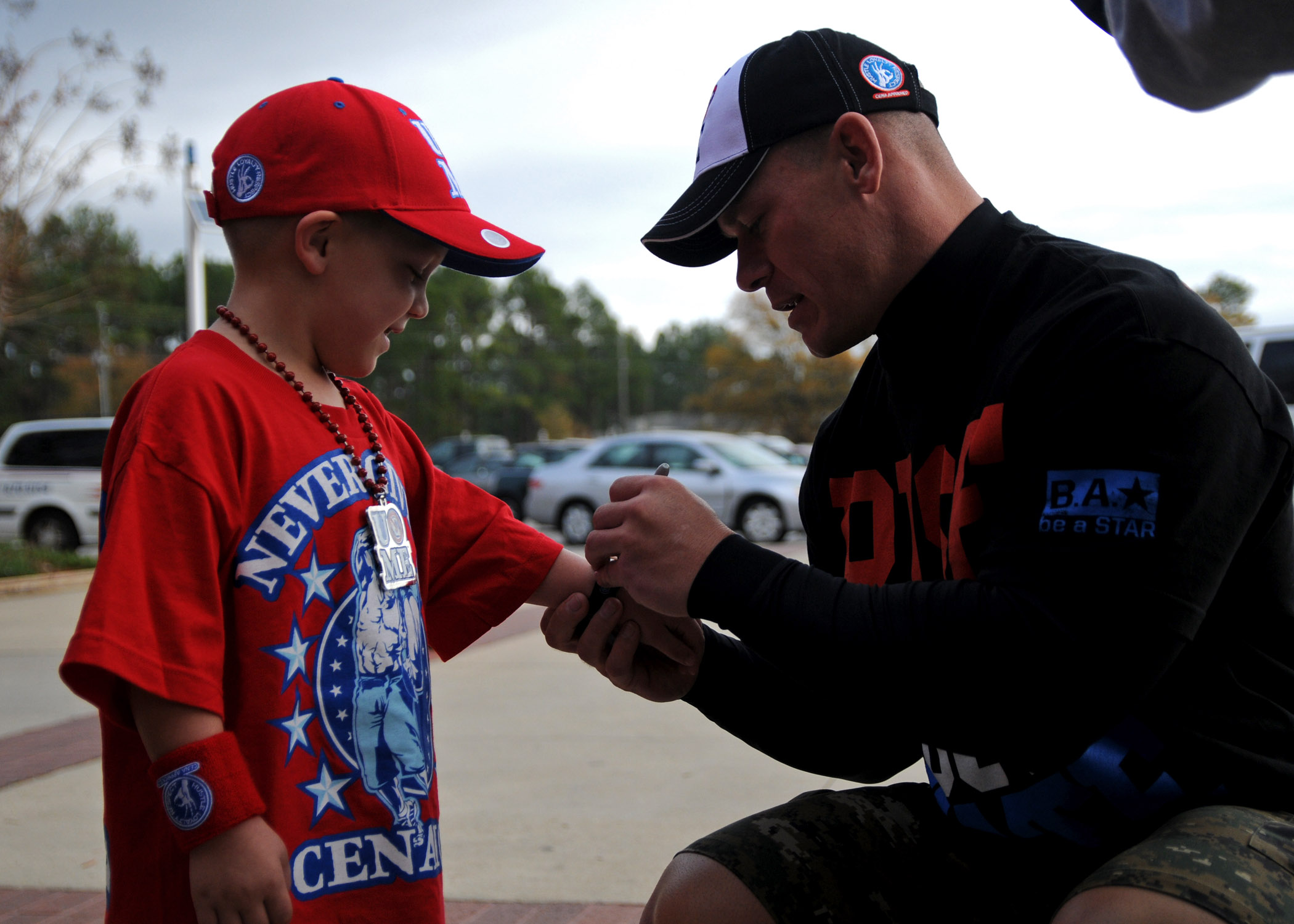
Cena signing merchandise for a young fan

Before his professional wrestling career, Cena appeared in an advertisement for Gold's Gym. As a wrestler, he has endorsed the energy drink YJ Stinger, appearing in commercials beginning in October 2003, and Subway, for whom he filmed advertisements with their spokesperson Jared Fogle in November 2006 that began airing the following January. In 2007, he also endorsed two "signature collections" of energy drinks and energy bars sold by American Body Builders.

In 2008, Cena filmed a commercial as part of Gillette's "Young Guns" NASCAR campaign. In 2009, Cena expanded his relationship with Gillette by introducing a new online campaign called "Be A Superstar" featuring himself alongside fellow WWE wrestlers Chris Jericho and Cody Rhodes. The campaign features motivational videos. After Dwayne "the Rock" Johnson called Cena "Fruity Pebbles" during their feud, in reference to Cena's colorful merchandise, Cena appeared on the box of Fruity Pebbles cereal in 2013.

Cena was the pace car driver for the 2016 Daytona 500. On October 13, 2016, Cena made his voice acting debut as Ernie the Elephant in a new advertising campaign launched by Wonderful Pistachios. He was named to Adweek's "Creative 100" and received praise for his performance. In 2020, Cena and Honda announced a partnership, with Cena becoming the new voice of Honda.

=== Philanthropy ===
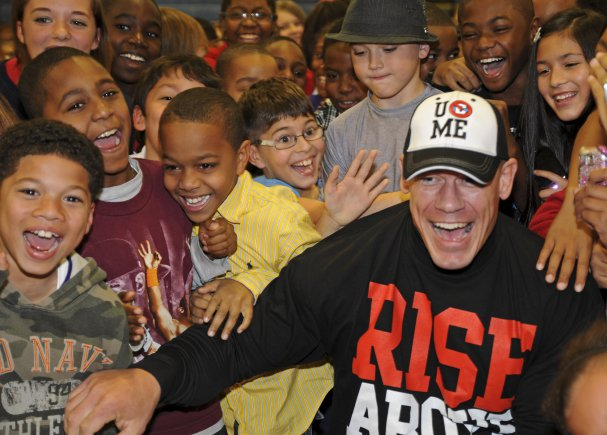
Cena posing with children

Cena has granted over 650 wishes for children with life-threatening illnesses through the Make-A-Wish Foundation—the most in Make-A-Wish history, with his first wish dating back to 2002. The Guinness Book of World Records confirmed that not only had Cena granted this many wishes by mid-2022, but that second place was fewer than 200. In 2009, Cena received the Chris Greicius Celebrity Award.

From late 2011 until WrestleMania XXVIII, Cena wore a black "Rise Above Hate" T-shirt promoting WWE's "Be a Star" anti-bullying campaign. In September and October 2012, Cena wore pink and black with the phrase "Rise Above Cancer" in partnership with Susan G. Komen for the Cure as part of Breast Cancer Awareness Month. In July 2016, Cena appeared in a public service announcement, "We Are America", sponsored by the Ad Council as part of its "Love Has No Labels" campaign. Cena made a $1 million donation to Black Lives Matter in June 2020 as part of the #MatchAMillion initiative made popular by K-pop band BTS.

=== Books ===
Cena also wrote a children's book called "Elbow Grease", with illustrations by Howard McWilliam.

== In popular culture ==
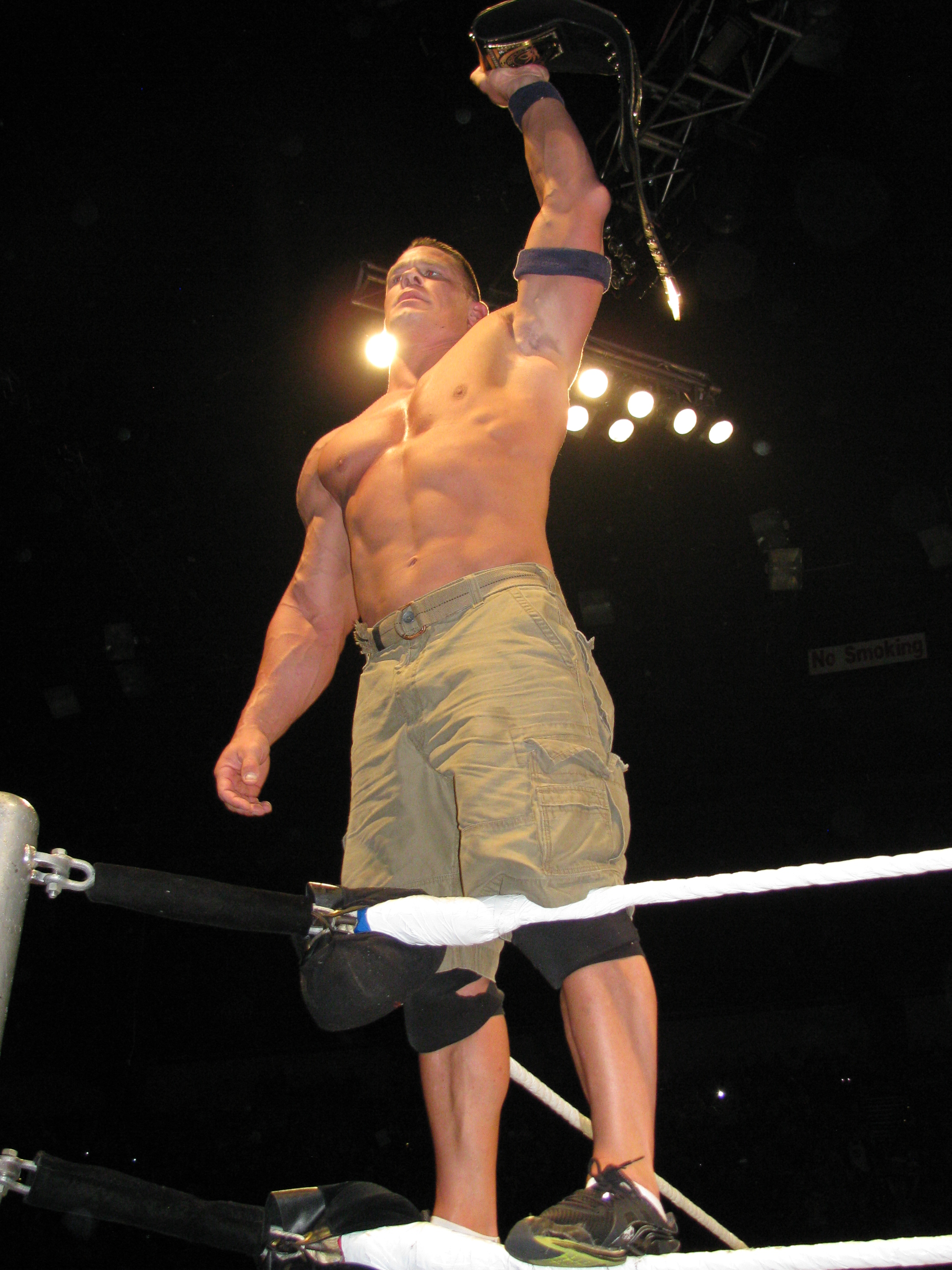
Cena showboating the WWE Championship belt in Adelaide, Australia

His catchphrase "You Can't See Me" originates from 2003 when Cena was producing his new theme song, during which he was dared by his little brother to do the yayo dance on TV, which consists of moving your head while looking into the palm of your hand. Cena accepted the dare, but did it in reverse by waving his hand in front of his face instead to make it look more visible to his brother. Over time, this evolved into his signature catchphrase "You Can't See Me". In mid-2015, Cena was the subject of the Internet meme "Unexpected John Cena", also known as simply "Unexpected Cena" or "IT'S JOHN CENA". He has also been the subject of many memes due to his "You can't see me" catchphrase, such as being invisible in photos.

On May 10, 2021, Cena posted a video on his Weibo account, in which he sat in a car and ate ice cream while promoting the upcoming film Fast & Furious 9. In the video, Cena speaks Mandarin and sings into the ice cream cone as if it were a microphone. The video was viewed by millions of users and inspired the creation of the meme "Bing Chilling", a mishearing of bīngqílín (冰淇淋), which means ice cream and is said repeatedly in the video.

== Personal life ==
Cena resides in Land O' Lakes, Florida. He has often said that he does not want children because he would not want to be an absentee parent due to focusing on his career. He supports New England based sports teams such as the Boston Celtics and New England Patriots, and enjoys reading in his spare time. Cena revealed on an episode of The Joe Rogan Experience he is a fan of the computer game Roller Coaster Tycoon and used to play the game on his laptop during the early years of his career while traveling on the WWE bus.

=== Relationships ===
Cena was in a romantic relationship with fellow wrestler Mickie James from 2007 to 2008, which was incorporated by WWE into an on-screen storyline. While promoting his 2009 film 12 Rounds, Cena announced his engagement to Elizabeth Huberdeau. They were married on July 11, 2009. Cena filed for divorce on May 1, 2012, which was finalized on July 18. Later in 2012, Cena began dating fellow wrestler Nikki Bella. They became engaged on April 2, 2017, when Cena proposed to her at WrestleMania 33, but ended their relationship in April 2018; they had been planning to marry on May 5. Cena began dating engineer Shay Shariatzadeh in early 2019, and they were married on October 12, 2020, in a private ceremony in Tampa, Florida. The two had met during the production of Cena's 2019 film Playing with Fire, which was filmed in Vancouver, where Shariatzadeh was working.

=== Health ===
On March 31, 2025, Cena revealed he previously had skin cancer.

=== Legal issues ===
In December 2017, the Ford Motor Company sued Cena for breach of the contract under which he had bought his 2017 Ford GT. Ford alleged that he had sold it for a profit shortly after receiving it, instead of keeping the car for at least two years as agreed. Ford and Cena settled the dispute on June 19, 2018. While most of the settlement's details were not disclosed, it was reported that Cena had agreed to apologize to Ford, and that Ford had agreed to donate the amount they had received in the settlement to charity.

=== Interest in Chinese culture ===
Cena started learning Mandarin Chinese in 2016 to help the WWE expand its reach, and he spoke in Mandarin at a press conference in China. From July to November 2018, Cena lived in Yinchuan, China, to work with Jackie Chan on the film Hidden Strike. While there, he also created a show on WWE's YouTube channel in which he highlighted his trips to local markets and other stores.

== Awards and nominations ==
Award	Year	Category	Nominated work	Result	Ref.
CinemaCon	2017	Action Star of the Year	—N/a	Won	
Teen Choice Awards	2017	Choice Male Athlete	—N/a	Nominated	
People's Choice Awards	2018	The Comedy Movie Star of 2018	Blockers	Nominated	
Teen Choice Awards	2019	Choice Action Movie Actor	Bumblebee	Nominated	
Nickelodeon Kids' Choice Awards	2020	Favorite TV Host	Are You Smarter than a 5th Grader?	Nominated	
Critics' Choice Super Awards	2022	Best Actor in a Superhero Movie	The Suicide Squad	Nominated	
Nickelodeon Kids' Choice Awards	2022	Favorite Movie Actor	F9	Nominated	
MTV Movie & TV Awards	2022	Best Comedic Performance	Peacemaker	Nominated	
Hollywood Critics Association TV Awards	2022	Best Actor in a Streaming Comedy Series	Peacemaker	Nominated	
Critics' Choice Super Awards	2023	Best Actor in a Superhero Series	Peacemaker	Nominated	
Critics' Choice Super Awards	2026	Best Actor in a Superhero Series	Peacemaker	Nominated	
Primetime Emmy Awards	2026	Outstanding Movie	Heads of State	Nominated	

== Championships and accomplishments ==
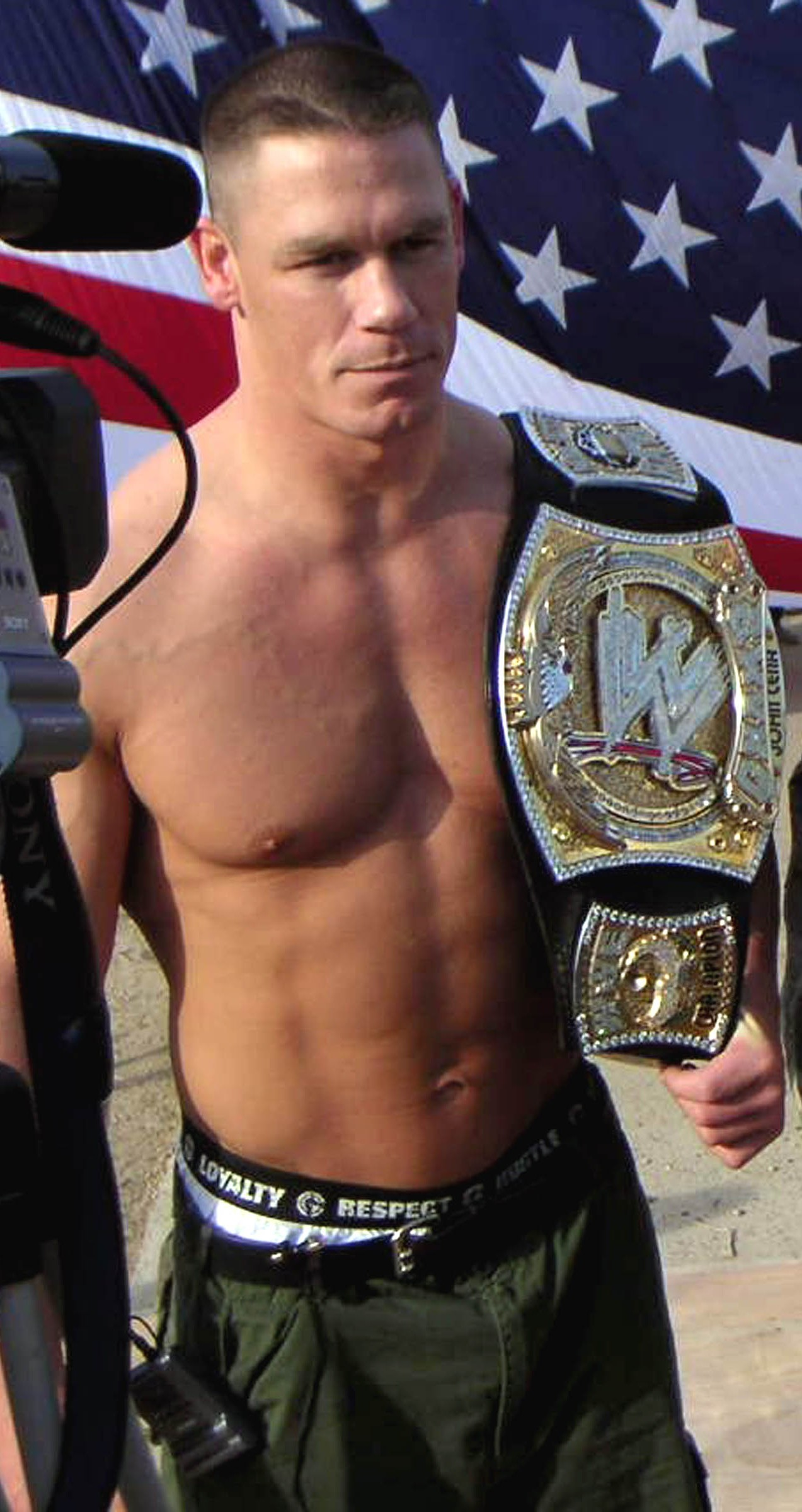
Cena has held the WWE Championship a record 14 times.

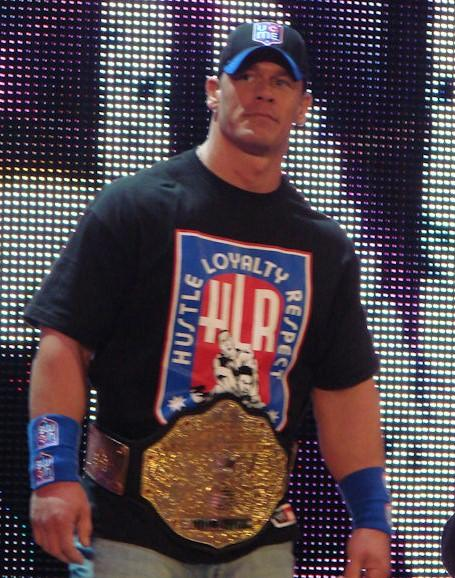
Three reigns as World Heavyweight Champion bring Cena's total to 17 world championships.

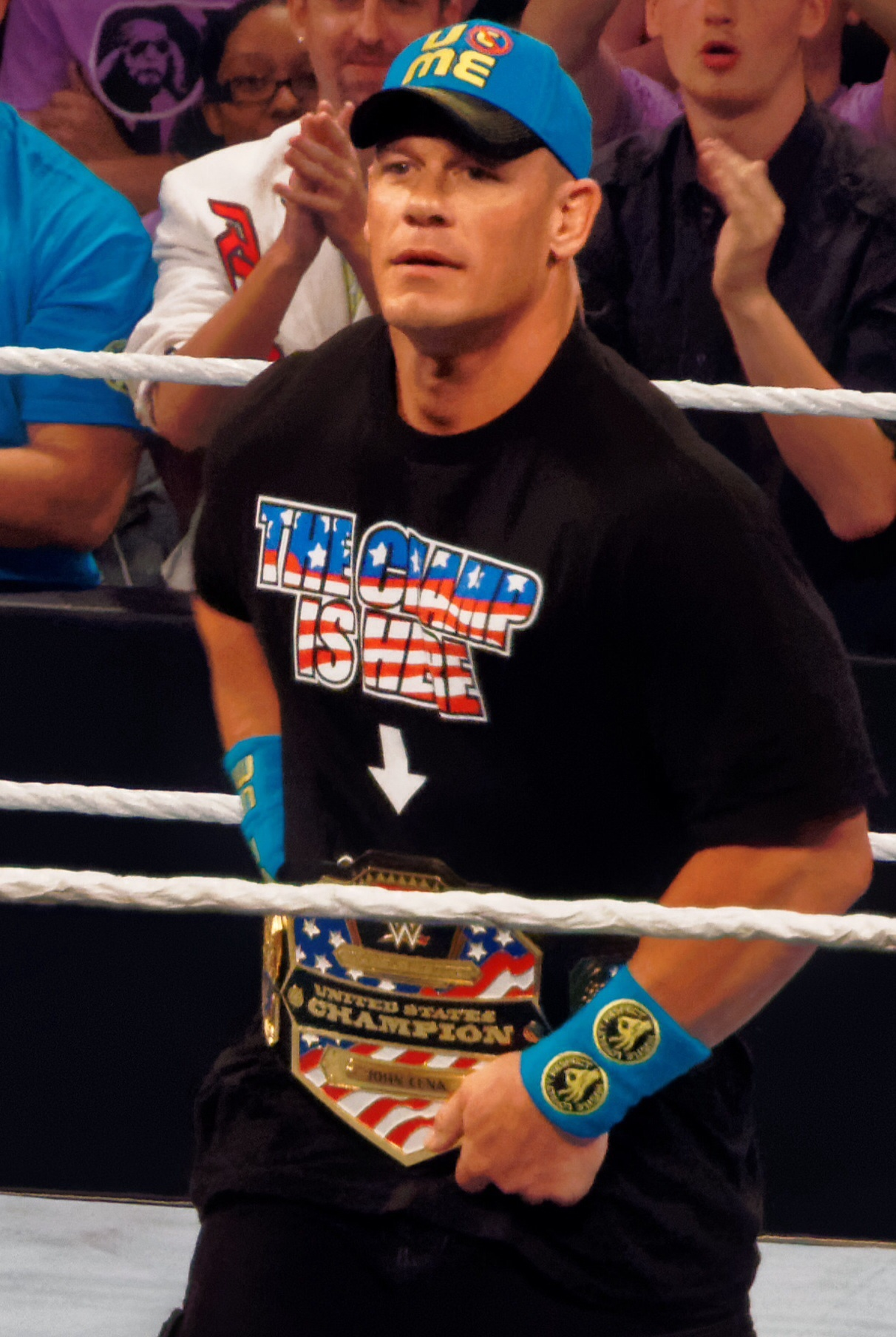
As a five-time United States Champion, Cena has the most reigns under the WWE banner.

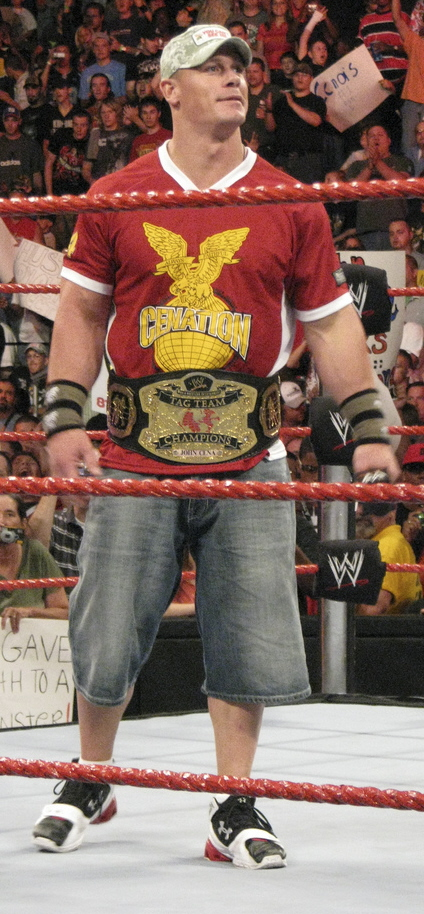
Cena is a four-time tag team champion in WWE, including two World Tag Team Championships.

=== Professional wrestling ===
- The Baltimore Sun
  - Best Feud of the Decade (2010) vs. Edge
  - Match of the Year (2007) vs. Shawn Michaels on April 23 at Raw
  - Wrestler of the Year (2007, 2010)
  - Feud of the Year (2010) vs. the Nexus
- ESPN
  - Match of the Year (2025) – vs. AJ Styles at Crown Jewel
- Guinness World Records
  - Longest WWE face run before turning heel (7,786 days)
- Ohio Valley Wrestling
  - OVW Heavyweight Championship (1 time)
  - OVW Southern Tag Team Championship (1 time) – with Rico Constantino
- Pro Wrestling Illustrated
  - Comeback of the Year (2025)
  - Feud of the Year (2006) vs. Edge
  - Feud of the Year (2011) vs. CM Punk
  - Match of the Year (2007) vs. Shawn Michaels on Raw
  - Match of the Year (2011) vs. CM Punk at Money in the Bank
  - Match of the Year (2013) vs. Daniel Bryan at SummerSlam
  - Match of the Year (2014) vs. Bray Wyatt in a Last Man Standing match at Payback
  - Match of the Year (2016) vs. AJ Styles at SummerSlam
  - Match of the Year (2025) – vs. Cody Rhodes at SummerSlam
  - Most Improved Wrestler of the Year (2003)
  - Most Popular Wrestler of the Decade (2000–2009)
  - Most Popular Wrestler of the Year (2004, 2005, 2007, 2012)
  - Wrestler of the Year (2006, 2007)
  - Ranked No. 1 of the top 500 singles wrestlers in the PWI 500 in 2006, 2007, and 2013
- Rolling Stone
  - Best Promos (2015) tied with Kevin Owens
  - Best Storyline (2015) vs. Kevin Owens
  - WWE Match of the Year (2015) vs. Kevin Owens at Money in the Bank
- Sports Illustrated
  - Muhammad Ali Legacy Award (2018)
  - Legacy Award (2025)
  - Ranked No. 4 of the top 10 wrestlers in 2017
  - Ranked No. 4 of the 20 Greatest WWE Wrestlers of All Time
- Ultimate Pro Wrestling
  - UPW Heavyweight Championship (1 time)
- World Wrestling Entertainment/WWE
  - WWE Championship (Note: The title was known as the WWE World Heavyweight Championship during his 12th reign and as the Undisputed WWE Championship during his 14th reign. Both the WWE Championship and the 2002–2013 version of the World Heavyweight Championship are recognized as world titles in WWE, making Cena a record-breaking 17-time world champion under the company's banner.) (14 times)
  - World Heavyweight Championship (3 times)
  - WWE Intercontinental Championship (1 time)
  - WWE United States Championship (5 times)
  - World Tag Team Championship (2 times) – with Batista (1) and Shawn Michaels (1)
  - WWE Tag Team Championship (2 times) – with the Miz (1) and David Otunga (1)
  - Money in the Bank (2012)
  - Royal Rumble (2008, 2013)
  - 35th Triple Crown Champion
  - 18th Grand Slam Champion (under current format; 25th overall)
  - WWE Championship No. 1 Contender's Tournament (2003, 2005)
  - Slammy Award (11 times)
    - Game Changer of the Year (2011) – with the Rock
    - Hero in All of Us (2015)
    - Holy Shit Move of the Year (2010) (Note: The award name was stylised by WWE as "Holy $#!+ Move of the Year".) – sending Batista through the stage with an Attitude Adjustment off the top of a car (occurred at Over the Limit, accepted by Wade Barrett on Cena's behalf)
    - Insult of the Year (2012) – "You're the exact opposite. One enjoys eating a lot of nuts and the other is still trying to find his" (to Dolph Ziggler and Vickie Guerrero)
    - Kiss of the Year (2012) – with AJ Lee
    - Match of the Year (2013, 2014) – vs. the Rock for the WWE Championship at WrestleMania 29, Team Cena vs. Team Authority at Survivor Series
    - Superstar of the Year (2009, 2010, 2012)
    - OMG Moment of the Year (2025) – turning on Cody Rhodes at Elimination Chamber: Toronto
- WrestleCrap
  - Gooker Award (2025) John Cena heel turn and retirement tour
- Wrestling Observer Newsletter
  - Best Box Office Draw (2007, 2025)
  - Best Gimmick (2003)
  - Best on Interviews (2007)
  - Feud of the Year (2011) vs. CM Punk
  - Match of the Year (2011) vs. CM Punk at Money in the Bank
  - Most Charismatic (2006–2010, 2025)
  - Most Charismatic of the Decade (2000–2009)
  - Wrestler of the Year (2007, 2010)
  - Worst Feud of the Year (2012) vs. Kane
  - Worst Worked Match of the Year (2012) vs. John Laurinaitis at Over the Limit
  - Worst Worked Match of the Year (2014) vs. Bray Wyatt at Extreme Rules
  - Worst Match of the Year (2025) vs. Cody Rhodes at WrestleMania 41
  - Worst Gimmick (2025) Heel John Cena
  - Wrestling Observer Newsletter Hall of Fame (Class of 2012)

=== Other awards and honors ===
- NCAA Division III All-American
- Springfield College Athletic Hall of Fame inductee (Class of 2015)
- Make-A-Wish Foundation Chris Greicius Celebrity Award
- Make-A-Wish Foundation Special Recognition Award (for being the first to grant 300 wishes)
- Guinness World Records – most wishes granted through the Make-A-Wish Foundation (650+)
- Grand Marshall of the 2010 Gillette Fusion ProGlide 500
- 2014 Sports Social TV Entertainer of the Year
- 2014 Rumble Royalty Hall of Game Award
- 2014 Susan G. Komen Race for the Cure grand marshal
- 2016 USO Legacy of Achievement Award
- 2024 NCAA Silver Anniversary Award
- November 10 declared John Cena Day by the commonwealth of Massachusetts

== Notes ==
Preceded by Jeff Foxworthy	Host of Are You Smarter Than A 5th Grader? 2019–present	Succeeded by Incumbent
