= WWE: Universal Truth =

2020 extended play by Elias

EP by Elias
- Released: October 26, 2020
- Recorded: 2020
- Genre: Blues, spoken word
- Length: 11:24
- Label: WWE Music Group
- Producer: CFO$

Elias chronology
WWE: Walk with Elias (2018)	WWE: Universal Truth (2020)

WWE: Universal Truth is an extended play (EP) by American professional wrestler Elias, ring name of Jeffrey Sciulio. The EP was released by WWE Music Group on October 26, 2020. Sciullo performs all of the songs in his character of a guitar-playing drifter. The album reached number 1 on the Soundtracks category on Apple Music and iTunes within the first day of release.

== Track listing ==
All songs are performed by Elias. All songs are produced by John Paul Alicastro and Michael Conrad Lauri, known as CFO$.

Track	Song	Length
1	"Amen (I'm Going In)"	3:06
2	"Street Light"	2:42
3	"Lead Me Home"	3:13
4	"Amazing Grace"	2:23

== Promotion ==
On October 19, 2020, one week before the release of his EP, Elias performed the tracks "Amen (I'm Going In)" and "Lead Me Home" on Raw and was about to perform the two additional songs before being interrupted by Jeff Hardy. Elias later won the Slammy Award for Musical Performance of the Year for this performance.

== See also ==
- Music in professional wrestling
