= Slammy Award =

Professional wrestling award

- Slammy Awards logo
- Country: United States
- Presented by: WWE; Academy of Wrestling Arts and Sciences (kayfabe)
- First award: March 1, 1986; 40 years ago

The Slammy Awards, also known as the Slammys, is a concept used by WWE, where awards, similar to the Oscars and Grammy Awards, are given to professional wrestlers and other individuals within WWE, such as commentators and managers. Introduced in 1986, there have been 13 editions of the concept. The awards are a mixture of "serious" and "tongue-in-cheek". Winners of the award receive a statuette that depicts one wrestler holding another over his head.

The awards were discontinued after 2015. The same year, the NXT brand debuted its own exclusive awards, the NXT Year-End Awards (also rewarding the NXT UK brand in 2019 and 2020), with wrestlers from Raw and SmackDown being instead rewarded by the WWE Year-End Award in 2018 and 2019.

In 2020, it was announced that WWE would be reviving the Slammy Awards for their Raw and SmackDown brands, with the winners announced live on the WWE Network. Following the 2020 awards the Slammys went on hiatus again until a 2024 edition was announced, determined entirely by fan vote. Shawn Michaels and The Undertaker hold the record for the most Slammy Awards won by a WWE superstar at fifteen each.

== Editions ==
=== 1986 Slammy Awards ===
The Slammy Awards was initially conceived to commemorate the release of The Wrestling Album, a music album featuring various professional wrestlers from the World Wrestling Federation (WWF, now known as WWE). The ceremony took place on March 1, 1986, from the Civic Center in Baltimore, and aired live on MTV. Martha Quinn served as an interviewer. Gene Okerlund, Jimmy Hart, Hillbilly Jim, and Junkyard Dog performed their songs from the album.

Winners are listed first, highlighted in boldface.

**Best Single Performer**: **Junkyard Dog**; Lou Albano; Gene Okerlund; "Rowdy" Roddy Piper; Nikolai Volkoff; Jimmy Hart; Hillbilly Jim	**Best Producer**: **Mona Flambe aka Cyndi Lauper**; Rick Derringer; Joel Dorn	**Best Commentator**: **Gene Okerlund**; Vince McMahon; Jesse Ventura
**Best Single Performer**: **Junkyard Dog**; Lou Albano; Gene Okerlund; "Rowdy" Roddy Piper; Nikolai Volkoff; Jimmy Hart; Hillbilly Jim	**Best Personality in "Land of a Thousand Dances"**: **Roddy Piper**; All wrestlers in the video were nominees	**Most Ignominious**: **Nikolai Volkoff**

=== 1987 Slammy Awards ===
The Slammy Awards returned a year later, now honoring the events and individuals involved within the professional wrestling aspect of the World Wrestling Federation. The second edition of the ceremony (referred to in commercials and on-air as the 37th annual Slammy Awards) took place on December 16, 1987, from Caesars Atlantic City in Atlantic City, New Jersey. It aired in syndication on December 19, 1987. The ceremony was hosted by Jesse Ventura and Gene Okerlund. Musical numbers were performed by Vince McMahon (singing the song "Stand Back") and Jimmy Hart (singing "Girls in Cars"), with the entire WWF roster performing "If You Only Knew" as the show's closing number.

Winners are listed first, highlighted in boldface.

**Hulk Hogan Real American Award**: **"Superstar" Billy Graham**	**Woman of the Year**: **Miss Elizabeth**; Sherri Martel; Fabulous Moolah; Dolly Parton; Yoko Ono
**Jesse "The Body" Award**: **Rick Rude**; Butch Reed; The Ultimate Warrior; Hercules; Sherri Martel	**Bobby "The Brain" Heenan Scholarship Award**: **The Islanders** (**Haku** and **Tama**), **André the Giant**, **Hercules**, **King Kong Bundy**, and **Harley Race**
**Best Ring Apparel**: **Harley Race**; Demolition; Randy Savage; The Honky Tonk Man; Davey Boy Smith and Dynamite Kid	**Manager of the Year**: **"None of the above"**; Bobby Heenan; Mr. Fuji; Jimmy Hart; Slick
**Best Performance by an Animal**: **George Steele**; Frankie; Damian; Matilda	**Greatest Hit**: **Jim Duggan**; André the Giant; The Honky Tonk Man; Bam Bam Bigelow; Rick Martel and Tito Santana
**Best Vocal Performance**: **Jim Duggan**; Junkyard Dog; One Man Gang; Jimmy Hart; George Steele	**Song of the Year**: **No winner** (envelope eaten by Sika); Vince McMahon (performed "Stand Back"); Koko B. Ware (performed "Piledriver"); The Honky Tonk Man; Jimmy Hart (performed "Girls in Cars"); "If You Only Knew"
**Best Group**: **One Man Gang**; The Hart Foundation; The Heenan Family; NFL Players Association; The Grateful Dead	**Best Personal Hygiene**: **Nikolai Volkoff**, **Boris Zhukov**, and **Slick**; King Kong Bundy; Sika; Hillbilly Jim; George Steele
**Humanitarian of the Year**: **Ted DiBiase** (won through extortion); Cory Aquino; Bob Hope; Pope John Paul II; Rose Kennedy; Mother Teresa	**Best Head**: **Gene Okerlund** and **Bam Bam Bigelow**; Boris Zhukov; King Kong Bundy; The Haiti Kid

=== 1994 Slammy Awards ===
Dormant for years, the Slammy Awards returned on a special edition of WWF Mania which aired on December 31, 1994. Todd Pettengill and Stephanie Wiand presented the awards from the WWF television studios in Stamford, Connecticut.

Winners are listed first, highlighted in boldface.

**MVP**: **Diesel**	**Best Show**: **WWF Mania**
**Most Spectacular Match**: **Razor Ramon vs. Shawn Michaels in a ladder match – WrestleMania X**	**Best PPV**: **WrestleMania X**
**Best Manager**: **Ted DiBiase**	**Best New Generation Spot**: **Bret Hart – "Go get 'em, champ!" commercial**
**Best Tag Team**: **Diesel and Shawn Michaels**	**Worst Tag Team**: **Diesel and Shawn Michaels**
**Most Intimidating**: **The Undertaker**	**Best Entertainer**: **Oscar**
**Worst Idea**: **Abe Knuckleball Schwartz on strike**	**Sweatiest**: **Irwin R. Schyster**
**Biggest Rat**: **Owen Hart**	**Greediest**: **Tatanka**
**Best Coliseum Home Video**: **WWF Raw: Video Strategies & Secrets**	**Mouthiest**: **Jerry The King Lawler**
**Most Eccentric**: **Bob Backlund**	**Smelliest**: **(TIE) Henry Godwinn / Duke The Dumpster Droese**
**Most Likely To See Jenny Craig**: **Bastion Booger**	**Best Etiquette**: **The Headshrinkers**
**Most Devastating**: **Bull Nakano**	**Funniest**: **Dink The Clown**
**Most Evolutionary**: **(TIE) Gorilla Monsoon / King Kong Bundy**	**Most Patriotic**: **Lex Luger**
**Best Dressed**: **James E. Cornette**	**Biggest Heart**: **1–2–3 Kid**

=== 1996 Slammy Awards ===
The fourth edition of the Slammy Awards took place on March 30, 1996, from the Anaheim Marriott in Anaheim, California. It aired live on USA Network, and was hosted by Todd Pettengill.

Winners are listed first, highlighted in boldface.

**Leader of the New Generation**: **Shawn Michaels**; The Undertaker; Bret Hart; Razor Ramon; Diesel	**Lifetime Achievement Award**: **Freddie Blassie**
**"Minds Behind the Mayhem" for Manager of the Year**: **Sunny**; Paul Bearer; Mr. Fuji; Ted DiBiase; Jim Cornette	**Match of the Year**: **Shawn Michaels vs. Razor Ramon in a ladder match – SummerSlam**; Lawrence Taylor vs. Bam Bam Bigelow – WrestleMania XI; Howard Finkel vs. Harvey Wippleman in a Tuxedo match – Raw; Bret Hart vs. Diesel – Survivor Series; Henry Godwinn vs. Hunter Hearst Helmsley in a Hog Pen match – In Your House 5: Seasons Beatings
**New Sensation of the Squared Circle**: **Ahmed Johnson**; Isaac Yankem; The Bodydonnas; Savio Vega; Goldust	**Which WWF World Heavyweight Champion, past or present, in attendance, is Hall of Fame bound?**: **Bret Hart**; Yokozuna; Diesel; Bob Backlund; The Undertaker
**"Put A Fork in Him, He's Done" for Best Finishing Move**: **Sharpshooter – Bret Hart**; Tombstone Piledriver – The Undertaker; Jackknife – Diesel; Pearl River Plunge – Ahmed Johnson; Banzai Drop – Yokozuna	**Master of Mat Mechanics**: **Shawn Michaels**; Davey Boy Smith; Bret Hart; Owen Hart; 1–2–3 Kid
**Best Buns**: **Sunny**; Goldust; Yokozuna; Shawn Michaels; Razor Ramon	**Best Slammin' Jammin' Entrance**: **Shawn Michaels**; Bret Hart; Diesel; The Undertaker; Goldust
**Crime of the Century**: **Vader's assault on WWF President Gorilla Monsoon**; Owen Hart taking credit for Shawn Michaels collapse; Sycho Sid attacks Shawn Michaels; Diesel repeatedly Jackknifing Bret Hart after losing the WWF World Heavyweight Championship to him; 1–2–3 Kid's fast count on Razor Ramon	**"I'm Talking and I Can't Shut Up" for Biggest Mouth**: **Jerry Lawler**; Dok Hendrix; Jim Ross; Jim Cornette; Brother Love
**Best Threads**: **Shawn Michaels**; Ted DiBiase; Goldust; Mr. Perfect; Hunter Hearst Helmsley	**Blue Light Special for Worst Dresser**: **Jim Cornette**; Harvey Wippleman; Henry Godwinn; Brother Love; Dok Hendrix
**WWF's Greatest Hit**: **The Undertaker drags Diesel into the abyss**; Diesel throwing Bret Hart through a table; Jeff Jarrett smashes Ahmed Johnson with a guitar; Yokozuna banzais two wrestlers at once; Hunter Hearst Helmsley	**Most Embarrassing Moment**: **Jerry Lawler kisses his own foot**; Ted DiBiase gets slopped by Henry Godwinn; Bodydonna Skip loses to previously winless Barry Horowitz; 1–2–3 Kid dons a diaper; Hunter Hearst Helmsley gets dropped into the hog pen
**Squared Circle Shocker**: **Shawn Michaels collapses**; Goldust's Premiere; Barry Horowitz gets his first WWF victory; 1–2–3 Kid sells out on Razor Ramon; Bob Backlund declares candidacy	**Best Music Video**: **Bret Hart**; Shawn Michaels; Sunny; The Ultimate Warrior; Jeff Jarrett

=== 1997 Slammy Awards ===
The fifth edition of the Slammy Awards took place on March 21, 1997, from the Westin Hotel in Chicago. It aired live on USA Network, and there was two celebrity presenters were Cindy Margolis and Walter Payton Nominees in some categories included celebrities with no connection to the WWF or even to professional wrestling at all. The event was sponsored by WWF Full Metal: The Album.

Winners are listed first, highlighted in boldface.

**Stri-Dex Star of the Highest Magnitude**: **The Undertaker**; Stone Cold Steve Austin; Bret Hart; Sycho Sid; Shawn Michaels	**Western Union Miss Slammy**: **Sable**; Sunny; Marlena; Chyna; The Funkettes
**Lifetime Achievement Award**: **Arnold Skaaland**	**Milton Bradley Match of the Year**: **Shawn Michaels vs. Bret Hart – WrestleMania XII**; Bret Hart vs. Stone Cold Steve Austin – Survivor Series; Stone Cold Steve Austin vs. Savio Vega – In Your House: Beware of Dog; The Undertaker vs. Mankind – SummerSlam; Shawn Michaels vs. Mankind – In Your House: Mind Games
**Super Soaker New Sensation of the Squared Circle**: **Rocky Maivia**; Stone Cold Steve Austin; Mankind; Marc Mero; Flash Funk	**PlayStation Best Finishing Maneuver ("1, 2, He's Got Him")**: **Sweet Chin Music – Shawn Michaels**; The Wild Thing – Marc Mero; Powerbomb – Sycho Sid; Stone Cold Stunner – Stone Cold Steve Austin; Sharpshooter – Bret Hart
**Full Metal Best Entrance Music ("#1 with a Bullet" The Edel Music Award)**: **The Undertaker**; Jesse James; Faarooq; Flash Funk; Sunny	**Best Couple**: **Goldust and Marlena**; Marc Mero and Sable; Chyna and Hunter Hearst Helmsley; Bill and Hillary Clinton; Siegfried & Roy
**Dimension Films "Dressed to Kill" Award**: **Sable**; Shawn Michaels; Marlena; Flash Funk; The Undertaker	**Best Tattoo ("Tatoo You")**: **The Undertaker**; Crush; Shawn Michaels; Tommy Lee; Drew Barrymore
**Coliseum Video Best Hair ("Best Hair Day")**: **Hunter Hearst Helmsley**; Mankind; Stone Cold Steve Austin; Bret Hart; Shawn Michaels	**Loose Screw**: **Mankind**; Sycho Sid; Stone Cold Steve Austin; Bob Backlund; Cosmo Kramer
**Tyco R/C Best Bow Tie**: **No winner** (Owen Hart stole the award); Clarence Mason; Bob Backlund; Steve Urkel; Yokozuna	**Larry Flynt Freedom of Speech Award**: **Stone Cold Steve Austin**; Jerry Lawler; Paul E. Dangerously; Faarooq; Howard Stern

=== 2008 Slammy Awards ===
The Slammy Awards were brought back in 2008 as part of a strategy to air more "special episodes" of WWE Raw and revive the brand as well as boost ratings. The event took place on December 8, 2008, from the Wachovia Center in Philadelphia. Certain awards were also presented on WWE's website.

Winners are listed first, highlighted in boldface.

**Superstar of the Year**: **Chris Jericho**; Batista; Edge; Jeff Hardy; John Cena; Triple H	**Diva of the Year**: **Beth Phoenix**; Michelle McCool; Kelly Kelly; Mickie James
**Tag Team of the Year**: **John Morrison and the Miz**; Priceless (Cody Rhodes and Ted DiBiase Jr.); Cryme Tyme (JTG and Shad Gaspard); Carlito and Primo	**Match of the Year**: **Ric Flair vs. Shawn Michaels – WrestleMania XXIV**; Royal Rumble match – Royal Rumble; CM Punk vs. Chris Jericho vs. John Morrison vs. Montel Vontavious Porter vs. Carlito vs. Mr. Kennedy vs. Shelton Benjamin in a Money in the Bank ladder match – WrestleMania XXIV; The Undertaker vs. Edge in a Hell in a Cell match – SummerSlam
**Breakout Star of the Year**: **Vladimir Kozlov**; Kofi Kingston; Evan Bourne; Ted DiBiase Jr.	**Announce Team of the Year**: **Todd Grisham and Matt Striker (ECW)**; Michael Cole and Jerry Lawler (Raw); Jim Ross and Tazz (SmackDown)
**Finishing Maneuver of the Year**: **Air Bourne – Evan Bourne**; RKO – Randy Orton; Hell's Gate – The Undertaker; Knockout Punch – Big Show	**Couple of the Year**: **Edge and Vickie Guerrero**; Santino Marella and Beth Phoenix; William Regal and Layla; Finlay and Hornswoggle
**Extreme Moment of the Year**: **Jeff Hardy gives Randy Orton the Swanton Bomb from the top of the Raw set – Raw, January 14**; Edge shoves The Undertaker off a ladder and through several tables – One Night Stand; Chris Jericho throws Shawn Michaels' head through the Jeritron 6000 HD – Raw, June 9; John "Bradshaw" Layfield and John Cena's Parking Lot Brawl – The Great American Bash	**"OMG!" Moment of the Year**: **CM Punk cashes in Money in the Bank briefcase and defeats Edge for the World Heavyweight Championship – Raw, June 30**; John Cena returns – Royal Rumble; Floyd Mayweather Jr. punches Big Show and breaks his nose – No Way Out; The Undertaker sends Edge to Hell – SummerSlam
**"Damn!" Moment of the Year**: **The Great Khali hosts the Kiss Cam – SmackDown, November 7**; CM Punk attacks Chavo Guerrero Jr. disguised as a Mariachi band member – ECW, January 29; Jim Ross dresses up as a sailor for Halloween – SmackDown, October 31; Santino Marella attempts Melina's entrance – Raw, December 1	**Best WWE.com Exclusive**: **John Morrison and the Miz present "The Dirt Sheet"**; Cryme Tyme's "Word Up!"; "Santino's Casa"; Howard Finkel's "Out-think The Fink"
**Best Musical Performance**: **R-Truth's entrance – SmackDown, September 15**; Santino Marella rapping to Akon – Raw, November 17; Edge singing "Heaven" – SmackDown, February 15; John Morrison and the Miz rap – The Dirt Sheet, August 29	**Best Impersonation**: **Charlie Haas as "The GlamaHaas" – Raw, October 27**; Charlie Haas as "Haas Hogan" – Raw, October 13; Charlie Haas as "Charlie Haas Layfield" – Raw, September 8; Charlie Haas as "Mr. (Im)Perfect" – Raw, September 22

=== 2009 Slammy Awards ===
The event took place on December 14, 2009, from the American Bank Center in Corpus Christi, Texas. It was hosted by Dennis Miller. The "Diva of the Year" award was decided by a fan vote, with votes cast through WWE's website.

Winners are listed first, highlighted in boldface.

**Superstar of the Year**: **John Cena won a tournament for the award**; Randy Orton (lost to Cena by pinfall in the final); The Undertaker (lost to Orton by countout in the first round); CM Punk (lost to Cena by submission in the first round)	**Diva of the Year**: **Maria**; All Divas were nominated
**Tag Team of the Year**: **Jeri-Show (Chris Jericho and Big Show)**; D-Generation X (Triple H and Shawn Michaels); The Legacy (Cody Rhodes and Ted DiBiase Jr.); The Hart Dynasty (David Hart Smith and Tyson Kidd)	**Match of the Year**: **Shawn Michaels vs. The Undertaker – WrestleMania XXV**; Jeff Hardy vs. Edge in a ladder match – Extreme Rules; John Cena vs. Randy Orton in an "I Quit" match – Breaking Point; Team Raw vs. Team SmackDown – Bragging Rights
**Breakout Star of the Year**: **Sheamus**; Drew McIntyre; Yoshi Tatsu; Abraham Washington	**Shocker of the Year**: **CM Punk forces Jeff Hardy to leave the company after Steel Cage match victory**; Batista turns against former friend Rey Mysterio; Randy Orton DDTs Stephanie McMahon and forces Triple H to watch; Sheamus slams Raw host Mark Cuban through a table
**Raw Guest Host of the Year**: **Bob Barker**; Ozzy and Sharon Osbourne; Seth Green; Shaquille O'Neal	**Extreme Moment of the Year**: **Jeff Hardy jumps from ladder onto CM Punk – SummerSlam**; Kofi Kingston lands a Boom Drop on Randy Orton through a table at Madison Square Garden; Big Show chokeslams John Cena into arena spotlight – Backlash; Triple H invades Randy Orton's home
**The "Oh My" Moment of the Year**: **Michael Cole vomits on Chris Jericho – SmackDown's 10th anniversary**; Chris Masters performs special "dancing pecs" routine for Osbournes; Shawn Michaels superkicks little girl in cafeteria; Santino Marella nails Vickie Guerrero with a pie

=== 2010 Slammy Awards ===
The event took place on December 13, 2010, from the New Orleans Arena in New Orleans. The awards were presented on Raw, with "supplemental" awards given on WWE's website. The "Superstar of the Year" award was decided by a fan vote, which were cast through WWE's website.

Winners are listed first, highlighted in boldface.

**Superstar of the Year**: **John Cena**; Randy Orton; Edge; Rey Mysterio; Kane; The Miz	**Diva of the Year**: **Michelle McCool won a battle royal for the award**; All Divas were nominated via battle royal (Note: Order of elimination: Kaitlyn, Rosa Mendes, Tamina, Brie Bella, Eve Torres, Nikki Bella, Maryse, Kelly Kelly, Melina, Layla, Beth Phoenix, Gail Kim, Alicia Fox, and Natalya.)
**WWE Moment of the Year**: **The Undertaker vs. Shawn Michaels – WrestleMania XXVI**; Edge spears Chris Jericho through the barricade – WrestleMania XXVI; Sheamus attacks Triple H with a lead pipe; John Cena counts the pinfall that gets him fired from WWE	**Shocker of the Year**: **The Nexus debuts**; The Miz cashes in Money in the Bank to become WWE Champion; Paul Bearer turns on The Undertaker; Randy Orton punts Chris Jericho
**Despicable Me Award**: **CM Punk sings "Happy Birthday" to Rey Mysterio's daughter**; Vince McMahon makes a truce with Bret Hart, then attacks him; Drew McIntyre embarrasses Theodore Long; Kane buries The Undertaker alive	**Guest Star Shining Moment of the Year**: **Pee-wee Herman vs. The Miz**; Mike Tyson punches out Chris Jericho; Wayne Brady gets RKO'ed by Randy Orton; William Shatner sings WWE Entrances
**Holy %&@*# Move of the Year**: **John Cena sends Batista through the stage with an Attitude Adjustment off the top of a car (accepted by Wade Barrett on Cena's behalf)**; John Morrison dives off the stage onto Daniel Bryan and The Miz; Kofi Kingston hits Drew McIntyre with a leg drop off a ladder; Randy Orton delivers an RKO to a flying Evan Bourne	**"Oh Snap" Meltdown of the Year**: **Edge destroys the Anonymous Raw General Manager's computer**; Big Show destroys Jack Swagger's trophies; Alberto Del Rio injures Rey Mysterio's arm with a steel chair; Batista quits WWE
**Knucklehead Moment of the Year**: **LayCool (Layla El and Michelle McCool) gets beaten by Mae Young**; Big Show unmasks a bald CM Punk; Beth Phoenix eliminates The Great Khali from the Royal Rumble; Santino Marella gets out-danced by Vladimir Kozlov	**WWE Universe Fan Reaction of the Year**: **"Angry Miz Girl" Cayley**
**"And I Quote ..." Line of the Year**: **Michael Cole**	**Best Performance By a Winged Specimen**: **Raw Chicken**
**Best Use of Exercise Equipment**: **Rosa Mendes**	**Most Menacing Haircut**: **Tyler Reks**
**Best Family Values**: **Kane beats up Jack Swagger Sr.**	**Superstar/Diva Most in Need of Make-up**: **Sheamus**
**Cole in Your Stocking**: **Daniel Bryan beats up Michael Cole – NXT**	**Outstanding Achievement of Baby Oil Application**: **Cody Rhodes**
**Frequent Tweeter Award**: **Goldust**	**Best WWE.com Exclusive TV Show**: **NXT**
**Most Annoying Catchphrase**: **Zack Ryder – "Woo, woo, woo, you know it."**

=== 2011 Slammy Awards ===
The event took place on December 12, 2011, from the Norfolk Scope in Norfolk, Virginia. The awards were presented on Raw, with additional awards given on WWE's website. The "Superstar of the Year" award was decided by a fan vote, which were cast through WWE's website.

Winners are listed first, highlighted in boldface.

**Superstar of the Year**: **CM Punk**; John Cena; Randy Orton; Mark Henry; Alberto Del Rio; The Miz	**Divalicious Moment of the Year**: **Kelly Kelly wins the WWE Divas Championship**; Natalya puts Layla and Eve Torres in a double sharpshooter- Raw: Power to the People (June 20); Kharma debuts – Extreme Rules; Beth Phoenix gives Eve Torres a Glam Slam from the top rope – Survivor Series
**Game Changer of the Year**: **The Rock challenges John Cena to a match at WrestleMania XXVIII**; Vince McMahon removed from WWE; Edge retires (for first time)- April 11 Raw; Kevin Nash costs CM Punk the WWE Championship – SummerSlam	**OMG Moment of the Year**: **The Undertaker kicks out of a Tombstone Piledriver against Triple H – WrestleMania XXVII**; The Rock gives John Cena a Rock Bottom – WrestleMania XXVII; Raw roster walks out on Triple H- October 3, Raw; CM Punk wins the WWE Championship and leaves WWE – Money in the Bank
Holy $#!+ Move of the Year: **Big Show and Mark Henry implode the ring after a superplex – Vengeance**; Sheamus delivers a powerbomb to Sin Cara through a ladder – Money in the Bank; Evan Bourne performs Air Bourne off a ladder – Money in the Bank; Randy Orton RKO's Christian onto the steel steps – SummerSlam	**"Tell Me I Did NOT Just See That" Moment of the Year**: **Jim Ross dancing during the "Michael Cole Challenge"**; Santino Marella almost winning the Royal Rumble match; The Miz disguised as The Rock; A young fan splashes water into R-Truth's face
**Trending Star of the Year**: **Zack Ryder**; Dolph Ziggler; Cody Rhodes; Daniel Bryan	**WWE A-lister of the Year**: **Snooki**; The Muppets; Hugh Jackman; Cee Lo Green
**"Pipe Bomb" of the Year**: **CM Punk**	**Outstanding Achievement in Muppet Resemblance**: **Sheamus**
**The Pee-wee Herman Bowtie Award**: **David Otunga**	**Most Predictable Outcome of the Year**: **Kevin Nash's powerbomb to Santino Marella after the trombone dance**
**Guess Who's Back or: Return of the Year**: **The Rock**	**Double Vision Moment of the Year**: **Sin Cara vs. Sin Cara**
**T-shirt of the Year**: **CM Punk – "Best in the World"**	**WWE.com Exclusive of the Year**: **John Laurinaitis congratulates CM Punk**
**Most Regrettable Attire of the Year**: **Michael Cole as Triple H**	**Critter Moment of the Year**: **The mouse that ran past Alberto Del Rio on Raw (August 15)**
**Superstar Transformation of the Year**: **Zack Ryder**

=== 2012 Slammy Awards ===
The event took place on December 17, 2012, from the Wells Fargo Center in Philadelphia. Awards were presented on Raw, on WWE's website, and on the TLC: Tables, Ladders & Chairs pre-show the day before. Votes for several categories were cast through the WWE App during the live broadcast; over 583,000 votes were tallied.

Winners are listed first, highlighted in boldface.

**Superstar of the Year**: **John Cena**; Big Show; CM Punk; Sheamus	**Diva of the Year**: **AJ Lee**; Layla; Kaitlyn; Eve Torres
**Newcomer of the Year**: **Ryback**; Brodus Clay; Antonio Cesaro; Tensai	**Match of the Year**: **The Undertaker vs. Triple H in a Hell in a Cell match – WrestleMania XXVIII**; Brock Lesnar vs. John Cena in an Extreme Rules match – Extreme Rules; Big Show vs. Sheamus for the World Heavyweight Championship – Hell in a Cell; The Rock vs. John Cena – WrestleMania XXVIII
**"Tell Me I Didn't Just See That" Moment of the Year**: **Kofi Kingston handstands during the Royal Rumble match to avoid elimination – Royal Rumble**; Brad Maddox low-blows Ryback – Hell in a Cell; Sheamus beating Daniel Bryan in 18 seconds for the World Heavyweight Championship – WrestleMania XXVIII; CM Punk attacks The Rock – Raw 1000	**Comeback of the Year**: **Jerry Lawler**; Brock Lesnar; Chris Jericho; D-Generation X
**Kiss of the Year**: **AJ Lee and John Cena**; AJ Lee and Daniel Bryan; AJ Lee and Kane; AJ Lee and CM Punk	**LOL Moment of the Year**: **The Rock throws John Cena's things into the Boston Harbor**; Kane and Daniel Bryan's anger management sessions; Randy Orton's food fight frenzy; Vickie Guerrero's danceoff with Brodus Clay
**Trending Now (Hashtag of the Year)**: **#FeedMeMore – Ryback**; #PeoplePower – John Laurinaitis; #LittleJimmy – R-Truth; #WWWYKI – Zack Ryder	**Feat of Strength of the Year**: **Sheamus delivers White Noise to Big Show**; Big Show KO Punches Sheamus – Hell in a Cell; Antonio Cesaro unleashes his Neutralizer on Brodus Clay; Ryback delivers Shell Shocked to Primo and Epico at the same time
**Best Dancer of the Year**: **Brodus Clay**; Rosa Mendes; R-Truth; The Great Khali	**Top Social Media Ambassador**: **Charlie Sheen**; Mike Tyson; The Muppets; Arnold Schwarzenegger
**Tweet of the Year**: **"Goat face is a horrible insult. My face is practically perfect in every way. In fact, from now on I demand to be called Beautiful Bryan." – Daniel Bryan**; "I don't have Instagram. I'm an adult." – Cody Rhodes; "I did it for Andy Kaufman." – CM Punk; "Yes, this is the real Great Khali. I'm ready to tweet with you!" – The Great Khali	**Insult of the Year**: **John Cena to Dolph Ziggler and Vickie Guerrero: "You're the exact opposite. One enjoys eating a lot of nuts and the other is still trying to find his."**; CM Punk calls Daniel Bryan "goat-faced."; Sheamus to Dolph Ziggler, while Ziggler was standing on a ladder: "Look at you there, Ziggler. You’re finally taller than everybody, congratulations."; The Rock to John Cena: "If John Cena had led the American Revolution, right now all of us would be playing cricket, we'd be sipping tea and we'd be blessing the Queen."
**Facial Hair of the Year**: **Daniel Bryan**; Damien Sandow; Cody Rhodes; CM Punk	**Betrayal of the Year**: **Big Show knocks out John Cena – Over the Limit**; Daniel Bryan dumps AJ Lee; AJ Lee walks out on Daniel Bryan; Eve Torres low-blows Zack Ryder
**Crowd Chant of the Year**: **"Feed Me More!" – Ryback**; "YES! YES! YES!" – Daniel Bryan; "Hoeski!" – Zack Ryder; "Cody's Mustache!" – Cody Rhodes	**Upset of the Year**: **Daniel Bryan defeats Mark Henry and Big Show – Royal Rumble**; Justin Gabriel defeats Antonio Cesaro; Dolph Ziggler wins Money in the Bank; Santino Marella defeats Jack Swagger for the WWE United States Championship
**WWE.com Exclusive Video of the Year**: **Jerry Lawler speaks to WWE.com about his miraculous return**; Eve Torres fires The Bella Twins online; Daniel Bryan explains why he's "Mr. Small Package"; CM Punk and Paul Heyman address Punk's 365-day reign	**YouTube Show of the Year**: **Z! True Long Island Story**; Santino's Foreign Exchange; WWE Download; Are You Serious?

=== 2013 Slammy Awards ===
This event took place on December 9, 2013, from the KeyArena in Seattle, Washington, with over 13,000 people in attendance and was hosted by Booker T and Jerry Lawler. The awards were presented on Raw, its pre-show, and on WWE's website. Votes were cast through the WWE App during the live broadcast; over 1.64 million votes were tallied.

Winners are listed first, highlighted in boldface.

**Superstar of the Year**: **Daniel Bryan**; John Cena; Randy Orton; CM Punk; Big Show; Brock Lesnar	**Diva of the Year**: **The Bella Twins (Brie Bella and Nikki Bella)**; AJ Lee; The Funkadactyls (Naomi and Cameron); Natalya; Kaitlyn; Eva Marie
**Tag Team of the Year**: **Cody Rhodes and Goldust**; The Shield (Seth Rollins and Roman Reigns); The Prime Time Players (Darren Young and Titus O'Neil); The Usos (Jimmy Uso and Jey Uso); The Real Americans (Antonio Cesaro and Jack Swagger)	**Match of the Year**: **The Rock vs. John Cena for the WWE Championship – WrestleMania 29**; The Undertaker vs. CM Punk – WrestleMania 29; Cody Rhodes and Goldust vs. The Shield (Seth Rollins and Roman Reigns) – Battleground; Triple H vs. Brock Lesnar in a Steel cage match – Extreme Rules
**Breakout Star of the Year**: **The Shield (Dean Ambrose, Seth Rollins, and Roman Reigns)**; The Wyatt Family (Bray Wyatt, Luke Harper, and Erick Rowan); Big E Langston; Fandango (with Summer Rae)	**Faction of the Year**: **The Shield (Dean Ambrose, Seth Rollins, and Roman Reigns)**; The Wyatt Family (Bray Wyatt, Luke Harper, and Erick Rowan); The Real Americans (Antonio Cesaro, Jack Swagger, and Zeb Colter); 3MB (Heath Slater, Drew McIntyre, and Jinder Mahal)
**"THIS IS AWESOME!" Moment of the Year**: **Big Show knocks out Triple H**; Dolph Ziggler cashes in Money in the Bank; Kofi Kingston hops on a chair to save himself from elimination in the Royal Rumble match – Royal Rumble; Daniel Bryan wins the WWE Championship from Randy Orton – Night of Champions	**"LOL!" Moment of the Year**: **The Rock concert – 20th anniversary of Raw**; Vickie Guerrero is fired as Raw General Manager; Titus O'Neil throws up on JBL, Michael Cole, and Zeb Colter – SmackDown; The Great Khali and Jinder Mahal try to charm Santino Marella's cobra – SmackDown
**Double-Cross of the Year**: **Shawn Michaels superkicks Daniel Bryan – Hell in a Cell**; Triple H turns on Daniel Bryan and costs him the WWE Championship – SummerSlam; Mark Henry's "retirement speech" – Raw; Paul Heyman turns on CM Punk and costs him the Money in the Bank contract – Money in the Bank	**Fan Participation of the Year**: **"Yes! Yes! Yes!" – Daniel Bryan**; Fandango-ing; "Let's go Cena/Cena sucks!" – John Cena; "What's up!" – R-Truth
**Insult of the Year**: **Stephanie McMahon insults Big Show**; AJ Lee goes off on the Total Divas cast; Paul Heyman's insults toward CM Punk; Zeb Colter's insults	**Extreme Moment of the Year**: **CM Punk exacts vengeance on Paul Heyman – Hell in a Cell**; The Shield triple powerbombs The Undertaker – SmackDown; Ryback spears John Cena through the LED light board – Extreme Rules; The Wyatt Family crushes Kane – SummerSlam
**Trending Now (Hashtag of the Year)**: **#BelieveInTheShield – The Shield**; #BestForBusiness – The Authority; #FollowTheBuzzards – The Wyatt Family; #WeThePeople – The Real Americans	**Beard of the Year**: **Daniel Bryan**; Damien Sandow; The Wyatt Family (Bray Wyatt, Luke Harper, and Erick Rowan); Zeb Colter
**"What a Maneuver!" Award**: **Spear – Roman Reigns**; Running knee strike – Daniel Bryan; Black Widow – AJ Lee; Cesaro Swing – Antonio Cesaro	**"You Still Got It!" Best Superstar Return**: **Goldust**; Rob Van Dam; The Bella Twins (Brie Bella and Nikki Bella); Bruno Sammartino; Chris Jericho
**Couple of the Year**: **Daniel Bryan and Brie Bella**; Triple H and Stephanie McMahon; Fandango and Summer Rae; Tyson Kidd and Natalya; John Cena and Nikki Bella; Jimmy Uso and Naomi	**Feat of Strength of the Year**: **Mark Henry pulls two trucks with his bare hands**; Antonio Cesaro swings The Great Khali; Ryback Shell Shocks Mark Henry; The Shield (Dean Ambrose, Seth Rollins, and Roman Reigns) triple powerbombs Big Show
**"Say What?!" Quote of the Year**: **"One stipulation: I'm in my boys' corner and I'll be your huckleberry all night long." – Dusty Rhodes**; "Paul, say somethin' stupid" – Brock Lesnar; "Rise above THIS" – Damien Sandow; "The "Paulcano" eruption" – Paul Heyman	**Best Dance Moves**: **The Funkadactyls (Naomi and Cameron)**; Fandango; R-Truth; Summer Rae; The Great Khali; Miz-co Inferno
**Favorite Web Show**: **The JBL and Cole Show**; WWE Inbox; 30-Second Fury; WWE Top 10	**Best Crowd of the Year**: **Raw after WrestleMania (East Rutherford, New Jersey)**; Payback (Chicago); SummerSlam (Los Angeles); Raw in England (London on April 22)
**Catchphrase of the Year**: **"YES! YES! YES!" – Daniel Bryan**; "That's What I Do" – Mark Henry; "FAAAAAHHNNNN...DAAAAHHHHNNN...GO" – Fandango; "Follow the Buzzards" – Bray Wyatt; "We the People" – The Real Americans (Antonio Cesaro, Jack Swagger, and Zeb Colter); "Believe in The Shield" – The Shield (Dean Ambrose, Seth Rollins, and Roman Reigns)

=== 2014 Slammy Awards ===
This event took place on December 8, 2014, from the Bon Secours Wellness Arena in Greenville, South Carolina. It was hosted by Seth Green. The awards were presented on Raw, its pre-show and on WWE's website. Votes were cast through WWE's website for the pre-show and website awards, while the main categories were voted through the WWE App during the live broadcast.

Winners are listed first, highlighted in boldface.

**Superstar of the Year**: **Roman Reigns**; Brock Lesnar; Dean Ambrose; John Cena; Seth Rollins; Daniel Bryan; Bray Wyatt	**Diva of the Year**: **AJ Lee**; Paige; Nikki Bella; Brie Bella
**Tag Team of the Year**: **The Usos (Jimmy and Jey Uso)**; Gold and Stardust; Los Matadores (Diego and Fernando) with El Torito; Slater Gator (Heath Slater and Titus O'Neil) with Mini Gator; The Miz and Damien Mizdow	**Match of the Year**: **Team Cena (John Cena, Dolph Ziggler, Big Show, Erick Rowan, and Ryback) vs. Team Authority (Seth Rollins, Kane, Luke Harper, Rusev, and Mark Henry) in a 5-on-5 Traditional Survivor Series elimination tag team match – Survivor Series**; Daniel Bryan vs. Batista vs. Randy Orton in a Triple threat match for the WWE World Heavyweight Championship – WrestleMania XXX; The Shield (Dean Ambrose, Seth Rollins, and Roman Reigns) vs. Evolution (Triple H, Randy Orton, and Batista) in a six-man Tag team match – Extreme Rules; John Cena vs. Bray Wyatt in a Last Man Standing match – Payback
**Breakout Star of the Year**: **Dean Ambrose**; Rusev with Lana; Roman Reigns; Paige; Seth Rollins	**Faction of the Year**: **The Shield (Dean Ambrose, Seth Rollins, and Roman Reigns)**; The Authority; The Wyatt Family (Bray Wyatt, Luke Harper, and Erick Rowan); The Rosebuds
**Rivalry of the Year**: **Daniel Bryan vs. The Authority**; The Shield (Dean Ambrose, Seth Rollins, and Roman Reigns) vs. Evolution (Triple H, Randy Orton, and Batista); Brock Lesnar vs. John Cena; Rusev vs. Jack Swagger; Seth Rollins vs. Dean Ambrose	**NXT Superstar of the Year**: **Sami Zayn**; Adrian Neville; Tyler Breeze; The Ascension (Konnor and Viktor)
**"Tell Me You Didn't Just Say That" Insult of the Year**: **The Rock insults Rusev and Lana – Raw, October 6**; Nikki Bella tells Brie Bella that she wished she died – Raw, August 25; Paul Heyman raps on John Cena – Raw, August 11; Chris Jericho insults The Authority after Stephanie McMahon's arrest – Raw, July 28	**"This is Awesome" Moment of the Year**: **Sting debuts to help Team Cena defeat Team Authority – Survivor Series**; The YES! Movement occupies Raw, March 10; Stephanie McMahon gets arrested and taken away – Raw, July 21; Hulk Hogan, The Rock, and Steve Austin meet – WrestleMania XXX
**Surprise Return of the Year**: **The Ultimate Warrior returns to WWE at the Hall of Fame induction ceremony, WrestleMania XXX and Raw (April 7)**; Hulk Hogan returns as the guest host of WrestleMania XXX – Raw, February 24; Batista returns – Raw, January 20; The Rock returns to interrupt Rusev and Lana – Raw, October 6	**The OMG Shocking Moment of the Year**: **Brock Lesnar defeats The Undertaker, ending The Streak – WrestleMania XXX**; Seth Rollins turns on The Shield – Raw, June 2; Bray Wyatt's choir surrounds John Cena inside a steel cage – Raw, April 28; Nikki Bella turns on Brie Bella – SummerSlam
**LOL Moment of the Year**: **Damien Mizdow as The Miz's stunt double**; Mr. T thanks his mother at the Hall of Fame induction ceremony; Vickie Guerrero throws Stephanie McMahon into a pool of pudding – Raw, June 23; El Torito vs. Hornswoggle in a WeeLC match – Extreme Rules	**Extreme Moment of the Year**: **Chris Jericho hits a cross-body on Bray Wyatt from the top of a steel cage – Raw, September 8**; Brock Lesnar hits 16 German suplexes on John Cena – SummerSlam; Kane hits Daniel Bryan with Tombstone Piledrivers on the floor, steel steps and announce table – Raw, April 21; Seth Rollins curb stomps Dean Ambrose through cinderblocks – Raw, August 18
**Fan Participation Award**: **"You Sold Out" – Seth Rollins**; "Nine Ninety-Nine" – WWE Network; "We the People" – Jack Swagger; "I'm Afraid I've Got Some Bad News" – Wade Barrett; "He's Got the Whole World in his Hands" – Bray Wyatt	**Double-Cross of the Year**: **Seth Rollins betrays The Shield and joins The Authority – Raw, June 2**; The Authority turns on Randy Orton – Raw, November 3; Nikki Bella betrays her twin sister, Brie Bella – SummerSlam; Mark Henry turns on his friend, Big Show – Raw, October 27
**Animal of the Year**: **The Bunny**; Mini Gator; El Torito; Grumpy Cat	**Best Actor**: **The Rock**; The Miz; Batista; Damien Mizdow
**Tweet It! Best Twitter Handle or Social Champion**: **@HEELZiggler – Dolph Ziggler**; @JohnCena – John Cena; @ZackRyder – Zack Ryder; @Ryback22 – Ryback; @BellaTwins – The Bella Twins	**Hashtag of the Year**: **#RKOOuttaNowhere – Randy Orton**; #OccupyRaw – Daniel Bryan; #MoscowMooseKnuckle – The Rock; #EatSleepSuplexRepeat – Brock Lesnar; #NineNinetyNine – WWE Network
**Raw Guest Star of the Year**: **Hugh Jackman**; Larry the Cable Guy; Jerry Springer; Kevin Hart; Betty White	**Best Couple of the Year**: **Daniel Bryan and Brie Bella**; Triple H and Stephanie McMahon; Jimmy Uso and Naomi; Tyson Kidd and Natalya
**Anti-Gravity Moment of the Year**: **Seth Rollins dives off the balcony – Payback**; Adrian Neville's Red Arrow; Dean Ambrose dives onto the lumberjacks – SummerSlam; Kofi Kingston jumps from the barricade to the ring apron to avoid elimination in the Royal Rumble match

=== 2015 Slammy Awards ===
This event took place on December 21, 2015, from the Target Center in Minneapolis, Minnesota. Awards were presented on Raw, its pre-show, and WWE's website. Votes were cast for certain categories through Twitter, Instagram and Facebook, with voting for additional categories occurring on the WWE App during the live show.

Winners are listed first, highlighted in boldface.

**Superstar of the Year**: **Seth Rollins**; Every Superstar on the main WWE roster was nominated	**Diva of the Year**: **Nikki Bella**; Naomi; Paige; Sasha Banks; Charlotte
**Tag Team of the Year**: **The Usos (Jimmy Uso and Jey Uso)**; The New Day (Big E, Kofi Kingston, and Xavier Woods); The Prime Time Players (Darren Young and Titus O'Neil); Tyson Kidd and Cesaro; The Lucha Dragons (Kalisto and Sin Cara)	**Match of the Year**: **Brock Lesnar vs. The Undertaker in a Hell in a Cell match – Hell in a Cell**; Brock Lesnar (c) vs. John Cena vs. Seth Rollins in a Triple Threat match for the WWE World Heavyweight Championship – Royal Rumble; Sting vs. Triple H in a Pinfall and submission-only match – WrestleMania 31; John Cena vs. Kevin Owens – Elimination Chamber; Roman Reigns vs. Dolph Ziggler vs. Alberto Del Rio vs. Kevin Owens in a Fatal Four Way to determine the No. 1 contender for the WWE World Heavyweight Championship – Raw, October 26
**Breakout Star of the Year**: **Neville**; Kevin Owens; Charlotte; Tyler Breeze; Braun Strowman	**Rivalry of the Year**: **The Undertaker vs. Brock Lesnar**; Roman Reigns vs. Bray Wyatt; John Cena vs. Rusev; Team Bella (Nikki Bella, Brie Bella, and Alicia Fox) vs. Team B.A.D. (Naomi, Tamina, and Sasha Banks) vs. Team PCB (Paige, Charlotte, and Becky Lynch); Seth Rollins vs. Randy Orton
**Best John Cena's U.S. Open Challenge**: **vs. Cesaro – Raw, July 6**; vs. Dolph Ziggler – Raw, October 12; vs. Sami Zayn – Raw, May 4; vs. Dean Ambrose – Raw, March 30; vs. Neville – Raw, May 11	**Hashtag of the Year**: **#SuplexCity – Brock Lesnar**; #GiveDivasAChance; #SaveTheTables – The New Day; #AxelMania – Curtis Axel; #RKOOUTTANOWHERE – Randy Orton
**Celebrity Moment of the Year**: **Stephen Amell dives onto Stardust and King Barrett – SummerSlam**; The cast of Entourage introduces Zack Ryder – Raw, May 25; Machine Gun Kelly gets powerbombed off the stage by Kevin Owens – Raw, June 15; Jon Stewart gets involved in John Cena's match – SummerSlam; Wayne Rooney slaps King Barrett – Raw, November 9	**"Tell Me You Didn't Just Say That" Insult of the Year**: **Brock Lesnar coins "Suplex City" – WrestleMania 31**; Dean Ambrose calls Seth Rollins "Justin Bieber" – Raw, May 25; Seth Rollins calls Johnny Manziel "Johnny Idiot Face" – Raw, June 15; Seth Rollins disses Kane while celebrating The Authority's WrestleMania accomplishments – Raw, April 6; Paige spoils Charlotte's WWE Divas Championship celebration – Raw, September 21
**Best Original WWE Network Show**: **Stone Cold Podcast**; Breaking Ground; Table for 3; WWE 24; Swerved	**Double-Cross of the Year**: **Damien Mizdow eliminates The Miz from the André the Giant Memorial Battle Royal – WrestleMania 31**; Jon Stewart costs John Cena the WWE United States Championship – SummerSlam; Randy Orton turns on Seth Rollins – Raw, March 9; Paige attacks Charlotte and Becky Lynch – Raw, October 26; Stardust turns on Goldust – Raw, February 16
**Extreme Moment of the Year**: **Roman Reigns attacks Sheamus, Alberto Del Rio, Rusev, and Triple H with a steel chair – TLC: Tables, Ladders and Chairs**; Brock Lesnar and The Undertaker brawl throughout the arena – Raw, July 20; Luke Harper powerbombs Dean Ambrose through a ladder on the outside – WrestleMania 31; Seth Rollins breaks John Cena's nose – Raw, July 27; Neville dives off a ladder onto several superstars – SmackDown, June 11	**LOL! Moment of the Year**: **R-Truth misunderstands his status – Raw (June 8) and SmackDown (November 19)**; Edge and Christian bring back the kazoo – Raw, September 7; The Bushwhackers' (Butch and Luke) Hall of Fame induction speech; The Miz and Damien Mizdow's erectile dysfunction commercial – Raw, March 2; The New Day (Big E, Kofi Kingston, and Xavier Woods) get Stephanie McMahon and Triple H to dance – Raw, September 14
**The "OMG!" Moment of the Year**: **Kalisto executes Salida del Sol off the top of a ladder through another ladder on Jey Uso – TLC: Tables, Ladders and Chairs**; Seth Rollins cashes in his Money in the Bank contract during a match between Brock Lesnar and Roman Reigns to win the WWE World Heavyweight Championship – WrestleMania 31; Brock Lesnar's rampage in order to get his championship rematch the night after WrestleMania 31 – Raw, March 30; The Wyatt Family (Bray Wyatt, Braun Strowman, Luke Harper, and Erick Rowan) attack and carry off The Undertaker after his Hell in a Cell match against Brock Lesnar – Hell in a Cell; Sheamus cashes in his Money in the Bank contract against Roman Reigns to win the WWE World Heavyweight Championship – Survivor Series	**"The Hero in All of Us" Award**: **John Cena**; Natalya; Roman Reigns; Big Show; Titus O'Neil
**Surprise Return of the Year**: **Sting returns, as Seth Rollins' statue, and attacks Rollins – Raw, August 24**; Chris Jericho joins forces with Roman Reigns and Dean Ambrose – Night of Champions; The Dudley Boyz (Bubba Ray Dudley and D-Von Dudley) return to WWE – Raw, August 24; Alberto Del Rio and Zeb Colter return to WWE – Hell in a Cell; Demon Kane returns to prevent Sheamus from cashing in his Money in the Bank contract and attacks Seth Rollins – Night of Champions	**"This is Awesome!" Moment of the Year**: **The Rock and Ronda Rousey attack Triple H and Stephanie McMahon – WrestleMania 31**; Brock Lesnar destroys J&J Security's car – Raw, July 6; Randy Orton counters Seth Rollins' Curb Stomp into an RKO – WrestleMania 31; The Divas Revolution begins – Raw, July 13; The Shield (Dean Ambrose, Seth Rollins, and Roman Reigns) briefly reunite to triple powerbomb Randy Orton through the announce table – Payback

=== 2020 Slammy Awards ===
This event took place on December 23, 2020, and aired through WWE’s digital and social media platforms.

Winners are listed first, highlighted in boldface.

**Superstar of the Year**: **Drew McIntyre**; Asuka; Roman Reigns; Sasha Banks; Randy Orton; Bayley; Braun Strowman; Becky Lynch; The Fiend; Charlotte Flair	**Male Superstar of the Year**: **Drew McIntyre**; Roman Reigns; Randy Orton; Braun Strowman; The Fiend
**Female Superstar of the Year**: **Sasha Banks**; Asuka; Bayley; Becky Lynch; Charlotte Flair	**Tag Team of the Year**: **The Street Profits (Angelo Dawkins and Montez Ford)**; The Golden Role Models (Bayley and Sasha Banks); Nia Jax and Shayna Baszler; The New Day (Big E, Kofi Kingston, and Xavier Woods); Shinsuke Nakamura and Cesaro
**Match of the Year**: **The Undertaker vs. AJ Styles in a Boneyard match at WrestleMania 36**; The New Day (Kofi Kingston and Xavier Woods) (c) vs. The Hurt Business (Cedric Alexander and Shelton Benjamin) for the WWE Raw Tag Team Championship on Raw (November 16); Edge vs. Randy Orton at Backlash; Men's Royal Rumble match at Royal Rumble; AJ Styles vs. Daniel Bryan for the vacant WWE Intercontinental Championship on SmackDown (June 12); Roman Reigns (c) vs. Jey Uso in a Hell in a Cell "I Quit" match for the WWE Universal Championship at Hell in a Cell; Bayley (c) vs. Sasha Banks in a Hell in a Cell match for the WWE SmackDown Women's Championship at Hell in a Cell; Jeff Hardy (c) vs. AJ Styles vs. Sami Zayn in a Triple threat ladder match for the WWE Intercontinental Championship at Clash of Champions; Drew McIntyre vs. Roman Reigns in a Champion vs. Champion match at Survivor Series; Becky Lynch (c) vs. Asuka for the WWE Raw Women's Championship at Royal Rumble	**Rivalry of the Year**: **Edge vs. Randy Orton**; Seth Rollins vs. The Mysterio Family; Drew McIntyre vs. Randy Orton; Sasha Banks vs. Bayley; R-Truth vs. The World; Lana vs. Announcer Tables
**Return of the Year**: **Edge**; Roman Reigns; MVP; Goldberg; Sami Zayn	**Moment of the Year**: **The Undertaker's Final Farewell at Survivor Series**; Drew McIntyre defeats Brock Lesnar for the WWE Championship at WrestleMania 36; Becky Lynch announces her pregnancy on Raw (May 11); Edge returns in the Men's Royal Rumble match at Royal Rumble; The New Day's farewell address on SmackDown (October 16); Roman Reigns and Paul Heyman unite on SmackDown (August 28); Bayley betrays Sasha Banks on SmackDown (September 4); The New Day gets drafted to different brands on SmackDown (October 9)
**Breakout Star of the Year**: **The Street Profits (Angelo Dawkins and Montez Ford)**; Dominik Mysterio; Bianca Belair; Otis; Murphy	**Ring Gear of the Year**: **The New Day (Big E, Kofi Kingston, and Xavier Woods)**; Charlotte Flair; Sasha Banks; Seth Rollins; Bianca Belair; Shinsuke Nakamura; Carmella
**Musical Performance of the Year**: **Elias' live performance of Universal Truth on Raw (October 19)**	**Social Media Superstar of the Year**: **Bayley**
**Trash Talker of the Year**: **Lacey Evans**; **The Hurt Business (MVP, Bobby Lashley, Shelton Benjamin, and Cedric Alexander)**	**WWE Network Documentary of the Year**: **Undertaker: The Last Ride**
**Celebrity of the Year**: **Rob Gronkowski**	**Double-Cross of the Year**: **Bayley attacks Sasha Banks on SmackDown (September 4)**
**Referee of the Year**: **Charles Robinson**	**Most Creative 24/7 Pin of the Year**: **Drew Gulak in a janitor outfit on Raw (October 5)**

=== 2024 Slammy Awards ===
On March 22, 2024, it was announced that the Slammys were returning and the winners would be entirely determined by fans' votes. The voting ran March 22nd till the 27th with the winners being announced on April 7th from WWE World in a ceremony hosted by Cathy Kelley and Big E.

Winners are listed first, highlighted in boldface.

**Female Superstar of the Year**: **Rhea Ripley**; Bianca Belair; Bayley; Iyo Sky; Becky Lynch	**Male Superstar of the Year**: **Cody Rhodes**; Roman Reigns; Seth "Freakin" Rollins; Gunther; Jey Uso
**Best Entrance of the Year**: **Cody Rhodes**; Roman Reigns; Bianca Belair; Seth "Freakin" Rollins; Rhea Ripley; Becky Lynch; The Rock; "Dirty" Dominik Mysterio at WrestleMania 39	**Return of the Year**: **CM Punk at Survivor Series: WarGames 2023**; The Rock (Day 1 2024); Nia Jax on Raw (September 11, 2023); Randy Orton at Survivor Series: WarGames 2023; Naomi at Royal Rumble 2024
**Faction of the Year**: **The Judgment Day (Damian Priest, "Dirty" Dominik Mysterio, Finn Bálor, JD McDonagh, and Rhea Ripley)**; Alpha Academy (Akira Tozawa, Chad Gable, Maxxine Dupri, and Otis); Imperium (Giovanni Vinci, Gunther, and Ludwig Kaiser); The Bloodline (Jimmy Uso, Paul Heyman, Roman Reigns, Solo Sikoa, and The Rock); Damage CTRL (Asuka, Bayley, Dakota Kai, Iyo Sky, and Kairi Sane)	**Rivalry of the Year**: **Roman Reigns vs. Cody Rhodes**; Seth "Freakin" Rollins vs. Drew McIntyre; "Dirty" Dominik Mysterio vs. Rey Mysterio; Bianca Belair vs. Damage CTRL (Bayley, Dakota Kai, and Iyo Sky); R-Truth vs. The Judgment Day (Damian Priest, "Dirty" Dominik Mysterio, Finn Bálor, JD McDonagh, and Rhea Ripley)
**NXT Superstar of the Year**: **Tiffany Stratton**; Ilja Dragunov; Carmelo Hayes; Lyra Valkyria; Bron Breakker	**Breakout Superstar of the Year**: **LA Knight**; Jey Uso; Tiffany Stratton; Pretty Deadly (Elton Prince and Kit Wilson); Dragon Lee
**OMG Moment of the Year**: **CM Punk returns to WWE at Survivor Series: WarGames 2023**; Rey Mysterio punches "Dirty" Dominik Mysterio on SmackDown (March 23, 2023); Iyo Sky cashing in her Money in the Bank contract at SummerSlam 2023; The Rock slaps Cody Rhodes during the WrestleMania XL press conference; Damage CTRL (Asuka, Iyo Sky, and Kairi Sane) turns on Bayley on SmackDown (February 2, 2024); Cody Rhodes slaps The Rock on SmackDown (March 8, 2024)	**Social Star of the Year**: **Drew McIntyre**; Grayson Waller; Logan Paul; Chelsea Green; Liv Morgan
**Match of the Year**: **Charlotte Flair (c) vs. Rhea Ripley for the WWE SmackDown Women's Championship at WrestleMania 39**; Bad Bunny vs. Damian Priest in a San Juan Street Fight at Backlash 2023; Roman Reigns (c) vs. Sami Zayn for the Undisputed WWE Universal Championship at Elimination Chamber 2023; Gunther (c) vs. Chad Gable for the WWE Intercontinental Championship on Raw (September 4, 2023); Asuka (c) vs. Bianca Belair vs. Charlotte Flair in a Triple threat match for the WWE Women's Championship at SummerSlam 2023	**Mic Drop of the Year**: **Paul Heyman telling Cody Rhodes that his father, Dusty Rhodes, told him that "Roman Reigns was the son he always wanted" on Raw (February 6, 2023)**
**Fan Chant of the Year**: **"Yeah!" – LA Knight**	**Rizzie of the Year**: **Seth "Freakin" Rollins**
**Villain of the Year**: **"Dirty" Dominik Mysterio**	**Trash Talker of the Year**: **The Rock**

=== 2025 Slammy Awards ===
On March 21, 2025, it was announced that the Slammys were returning and the winners would entirely be determined by fans' votes. The voting ran from March 21st with the winners being announced on April 20th from WWE World in a ceremony hosted by Cathy Kelley and Big E.

Winners are listed first, highlighted in boldface.

**Female Superstar of the Year**: **Liv Morgan**; Rhea Ripley; Bayley; Nia Jax; Tiffany Stratton; Chelsea Green; Iyo Sky	**Male Superstar of the Year**: **Cody Rhodes**; Roman Reigns; Gunther; CM Punk; Damian Priest; Drew McIntyre; Jey Uso; Seth Rollins
**Most Memorable Entrance**: **Cody Rhodes at WrestleMania XL**; Jey Uso on Raw on the Netflix debut with Travis Scott; Roman Reigns at WrestleMania XL; The Rock at WrestleMania XL; Bayley at WrestleMania XL; Randy Orton at Bash in Berlin; Seth Rollins at WrestleMania XL with the Philadelphia Mummers Band; Sami Zayn in Montreal with Jey Uso; Sami Zayn at WrestleMania XL with Kevin Owens and Chad Gable; Logan Paul at SummerSlam with MGK; Liv Morgan at Bad Blood with Dominik Mysterio in the Lowrider; Drew McIntyre at Clash at the Castle: Scotland	**OMG Moment of the Year**: **John Cena turning on Cody Rhodes at Elimination Chamber: Toronto**; Cody Rhodes vs. Roman Reigns match finish at WrestleMania XL; Dominik Mysterio turning on Rhea Ripley with Liv Morgan at SummerSlam; Kevin Owens turning on Randy Orton and Cody Rhodes in October; The New Day turning on Big E on Raw; Tiffany Stratton's Money in the Bank cash-in on Nia Jax on SmackDown; Damian Priest's Money in the Bank cash-in on Drew McIntyre at WrestleMania XL; The Wyatt Sicks debut on Raw; Bron Breakker spearing iShowSpeed at Royal Rumble; Bronson Reed hitting a Tsunami on Braun Strowman onto a car; Roman Reigns returning at SummerSlam; Iyo Sky beating Rhea Ripley to become the Women's World Champion on Raw
**Faction of the Year**: **The OG Bloodline (Roman Reigns, Jey Uso, Jimmy Uso, and Sami Zayn)**; The Judgment Day (Finn Bálor, "Dirty" Dominik Mysterio, JD McDonagh, Carlito, Liv Morgan and Raquel Rodriguez); The Bloodline/MFT (Solo Sikoa, Jacob Fatu, Tama Tonga, and Tonga Loa); American Made (Chad Gable, Brutus Creed, Julius Creed, and Ivy Nile); Damage CTRL (Asuka, Dakota Kai, Iyo Sky, and Kairi Sane)	**Tag Team of the Year**: **Jade Cargill and Bianca Belair**; DIY (Johnny Gargano and Tommaso Ciampa); Awesome Truth (R-Truth and The Miz); A-Town Down Under (Austin Theory and Grayson Waller); Motor City Machine Guns (Alex Shelley and Chris Sabin); The Bloodline/MFT (Tama Tonga and Tonga Loa); War Raiders (Erik and Ivar); The Judgment Day (Finn Bálor and JD McDonagh); The Street Profits (Angelo Dawkins and Montez Ford); Liv Morgan and Raquel Rodriguez
**Rivalry of the Year**: **CM Punk vs. Drew McIntyre**; Roman Reigns vs. Cody Rhodes; Liv Morgan vs. Rhea Ripley; Damian Priest vs. Finn Bálor; Kevin Owens vs. Cody Rhodes; Nia Jax vs. Tiffany Stratton; The Bloodline/MFT vs. The OG Bloodline	**NXT Superstar of the Year**: **Roxanne Perez**; Oba Femi; Trick Williams; Ethan Page; Giulia; Kelani Jordan
**Match of the Year**: **Roman Reigns vs. Cody Rhodes at WrestleMania XL**; **CM Punk vs. Drew McIntyre – Hell in a Cell match at Bad Blood**; Roman Reigns and The Rock vs. Cody Rhodes and Seth Rollins at WrestleMania XL; Liv Morgan vs. Rhea Ripley at SummerSlam; Damian Priest vs. Gunther at SummerSlam; Cody Rhodes vs. AJ Styles at Backlash; 2024 Men's WarGames Match at Survivor Series: WarGames; Bayley vs. Iyo Sky at WrestleMania XL; Sami Zayn vs. Gunther at WrestleMania XL; Gunther vs. Randy Orton at Bash in Berlin; Seth Rollins vs. CM Punk on the Raw Netflix premiere	**WTF Moment of the Year**: **The Wyatt Sicks debut**; R-Truth calls Triple H “Ciampa”; Kevin Owens' car interviews; Chelsea Green goes into the dumpster; Dominik Mysterio in the shark cage; iShowSpeed with Logan Paul at WrestleMania; LA Knight in Logan Paul's pool; R-Truth wrestles with John Cena; Rabid noises from Tama Tonga; Jacob Fatu: “I Love You Solo”
**Social Star of the Year**: **Drew McIntyre**; Chelsea Green	**Breakout Superstar of the Year**: **Stephanie Vaquer**; Bron Breakker; Lyra Valkyria; Penta; Oba Femi; Giulia; Tiffany Stratton; Jacob Fatu; Chelsea Green
**Most Aura of the Year**: **Jey Uso**	**Villain of the Year**: **Liv Morgan and Dominik Mysterio**
**Mic drop of the Year**: Cody Rhodes tells The Rock “Go F*** Yourself“

== Records ==
- Most wins – Shawn Michaels and The Undertaker (15)
- Most wins in a single year – Shawn Michaels (1996) and Seth Rollins (2014) (6)
- Most nominations – Seth "Freakin" Rollins (38)
- Most nominations in a single year – Seth Rollins (2014) (15)

== See also ==
- List of professional wrestling awards
- List of Pro Wrestling Illustrated awards
- List of Wrestling Observer Newsletter awards
- NXT Year-End Award
