= WWE: Walk with Elias =

EP by Elias
- Released: July 23, 2018
- Recorded: 2018
- Genre: Blues, spoken word
- Length: 14:00
- Label: WWE Music Group
- Producer: CFO$

Elias chronology
WWE: Walk with Elias (2018)	WWE: Universal Truth (2020)

WWE: Walk with Elias is an extended play (EP) by American professional wrestler Jeffrey Sciullo, better known by his ring name Elias. The EP was released by WWE Music Group on July 23, 2018. Sciullo performs all of the songs in his character of a guitar-playing drifter. The album reached number 14 on the Top 100 US albums on iTunes in the first day of release.

== Track listing ==
All songs are performed by Elias. All songs are produced by John Paul Alicastro and Michael Conrad Lauri, known as CFO$.

Track	Song	Length
1	"The Ballad of Every Town I've Ever Been To..."	3:43
2	"Elias' Words"	2:52
3	"Nothing I Can't Do"	4:38
4	"Walk with Me"	3:17

== Charts ==
Chart (2018)	Peak position
US Digital Albums (Billboard)	20
US Heatseekers Albums (Billboard)	5
US Independent Albums (Billboard)	17
US Top Album Sales (Billboard)	10

== Promotion ==
On July 30, 2018, WWE aired a mockumentary titled Walk with Elias: The Documentary on the WWE Network, to promote the EP. Elias is seen meeting with John Alicastro and Mike Lauri of CFO$. The mockumentary also features other professional wrestlers, as well as Gregg Wattenberg of Arcade Songs, giving their opinions of the EP.

== See also ==
- Music in professional wrestling
