= Elias (wrestler) =

American professional wrestler (born 1987)

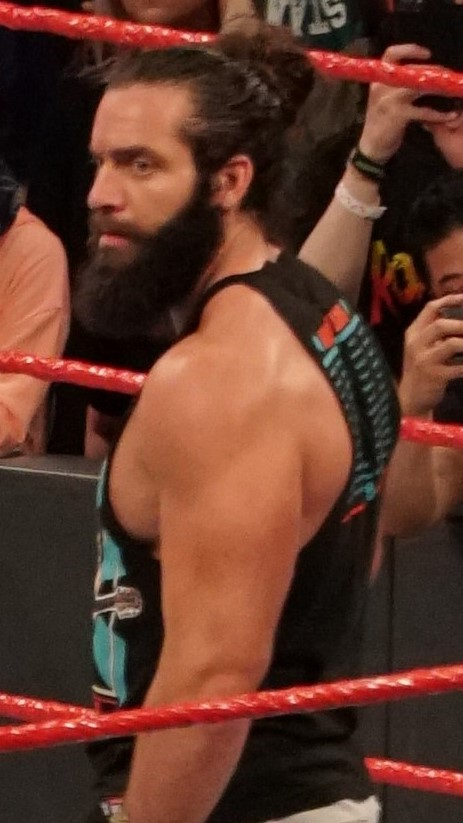
- Elias in 2018

Personal information
- Born: Jeffrey Daniel Sciullo; November 22, 1987 (age 38) Pittsburgh, Pennsylvania, U.S.

Professional wrestling career
- Ring name(s): Elias; Elias Samson; Elijah; El Vagabundo; Ezekiel; Logan Shulo
- Billed height: 6 ft 0 in (1.83 m)
- Billed weight: 217 lb (98 kg)
- Billed from: Pittsburgh, Pennsylvania
- Trained by: Shirley Doe; Benjamin Bisson; Super Hentai
- Debut: June 7, 2008
- Musical career
- Genres: Blues; spoken word
- Instruments: Vocals; guitar
- Years active: 2018–2020
- Label: WWE Music Group

Jeffrey Daniel Sciullo (born November 22, 1987) is an American professional wrestler and musician. He is signed to Total Nonstop Action Wrestling (TNA) under the ring name Elijah. He is best known for his tenure with WWE from 2014 to 2023, where he performed as Elias Samson, Elias, and Ezekiel.

Prior to joining WWE, Sciullo worked for various companies on the independent circuit under the ring name Logan Shulo. He then joined WWE and was assigned to the developmental brand NXT in 2014 under the ring name Elias Samson, which he portrayed as a musician who often used music to mock his opponents or the fans in attendance, and he was nicknamed "The Drifter". Shortly after joining the main roster in 2017, his ring name was shortened to Elias. In 2018, the EP WWE: Walk with Elias was released by WWE Music Group featuring Sciullo, which was followed by Universal Truth in 2020. After a hiatus starting in August 2021, Sciullo returned in April 2022, but as Elias' younger brother named Ezekiel. Later that year, Ezekiel was taken off television, and Sciullo returned as Elias until he was released from his contract in September 2023. In 2024, Sciullo returned to wrestling on the independent circuit under the ring name Elijah before debuting in TNA in February 2025.

== Professional wrestling career ==
=== Independent circuit (2008–2014) ===
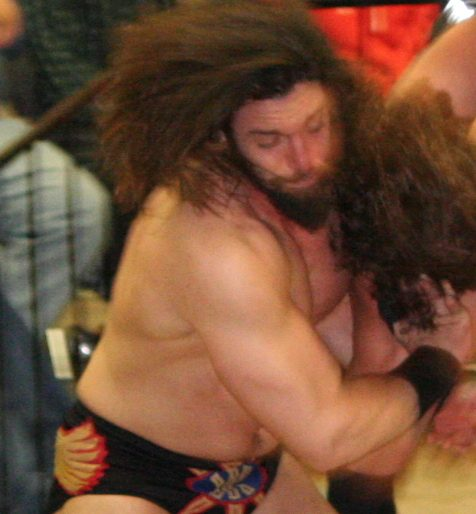
Logan Shulo wrestling at an International Wrestling Cartel (IWC) event in February 2012

Sciullo wrestled extensively on the independent circuit for various promotions in the Northeastern USA, primarily for the International Wrestling Cartel (IWC) under the ring name Heavy Metal Jesus, Logan Shulo. While in the IWC, Shulo won the promotion's Super Indy Championship and World Heavyweight Championship.

=== WWE (2014–2023) ===
==== NXT (2014–2017) ====
In early 2014, Sciullo was signed to a developmental deal by WWE under the ring name Elias Samson. He made his NXT debut at the April 24, 2014, tapings, working as an enhancement talent and teaming with Buddy Murphy in a losing effort against The Ascension. Samson was then used sporadically on television throughout 2014 and early 2015, mostly appearing as enhancement talent to wrestlers such as Baron Corbin.

In August 2015, Samson debuted a new drifter musician character in a match taped prior to NXT TakeOver: Brooklyn, approaching the ring with a guitar before defeating Bull Dempsey, and established himself as a heel at the same time. Samson then entered the Dusty Rhodes Tag Team Classic tournament, where he was paired with Tucker Knight, but the two were eliminated from the tournament by Dash Wilder and Scott Dawson. On the December 23 episode of NXT, taped before NXT TakeOver: London, Samson defeated Bull Dempsey with a diving elbow drop, which he would dub as a finishing move onwards. In the following weeks, Samson would rack up victories over various competitors such as Steve Cutler and Jesse Sorensen. On the March 23, 2016, episode of NXT, after he suffered a loss to Johnny Gargano, Samson would attack him only to be fended off by Apollo Crews. This led to a match between Samson and Crews that took place at NXT TakeOver: Dallas, where Samson was defeated. Throughout the rest of the year, Samson would compete in different matches against competitors such as Shinsuke Nakamura and Finn Bálor, but he would be on the losing side.

In what would be his final feud in NXT, Samson faced Kassius Ohno (whom he mocked after he had just lost an NXT Championship match against Bobby Roode) in the first ever "loser leaves NXT" match that took place on the March 29, 2017, episode of NXT, where Samson was defeated. Just a week later, on the April 5 episode of NXT (which was taped as part of NXT TakeOver: Orlando prior to the beginning of the event), Samson wrestled his final match on NXT as the masked "El Vagabundo" (Spanish for "The Vagabond"), where he lost to Oney Lorcan, who unmasked him afterwards.

==== Main roster beginnings (2017–2019) ====
On the April 10, 2017, episode of Raw, Samson made his main roster debut, appearing on the stage briefly during an eight–man tag team match, as well as walking through the crowd during another match later that night. Samson continued to appear in the background playing his guitar during backstage segments over the next few weeks. In his in–ring debut match on the May 22 episode of Raw, Samson defeated Dean Ambrose by disqualification after The Miz intentionally attacked him. In June, Samson started his first feud as part of the main roster with Finn Bálor, who interrupted him during one of his performances. This led to a match between the two, where Samson defeated Bálor in a No Disqualification match after interference from Bray Wyatt. In the end of July, WWE shortened his ring name to "Elias".

Elias was then placed in a feud with Jason Jordan, after Jordan would interrupt Elias during his songs by throwing vegetables at him at No Mercy. This would lead to a match between the two at TLC: Tables, Ladders & Chairs, where Elias was defeated by Jordan. On the November 6 episode of Raw, Elias was defeated by Jordan in a Guitar–on–a–Pole match, ending their feud. Two weeks later, Elias competed in his first title match as he unsuccessfully challenged Roman Reigns for the Intercontinental Championship.

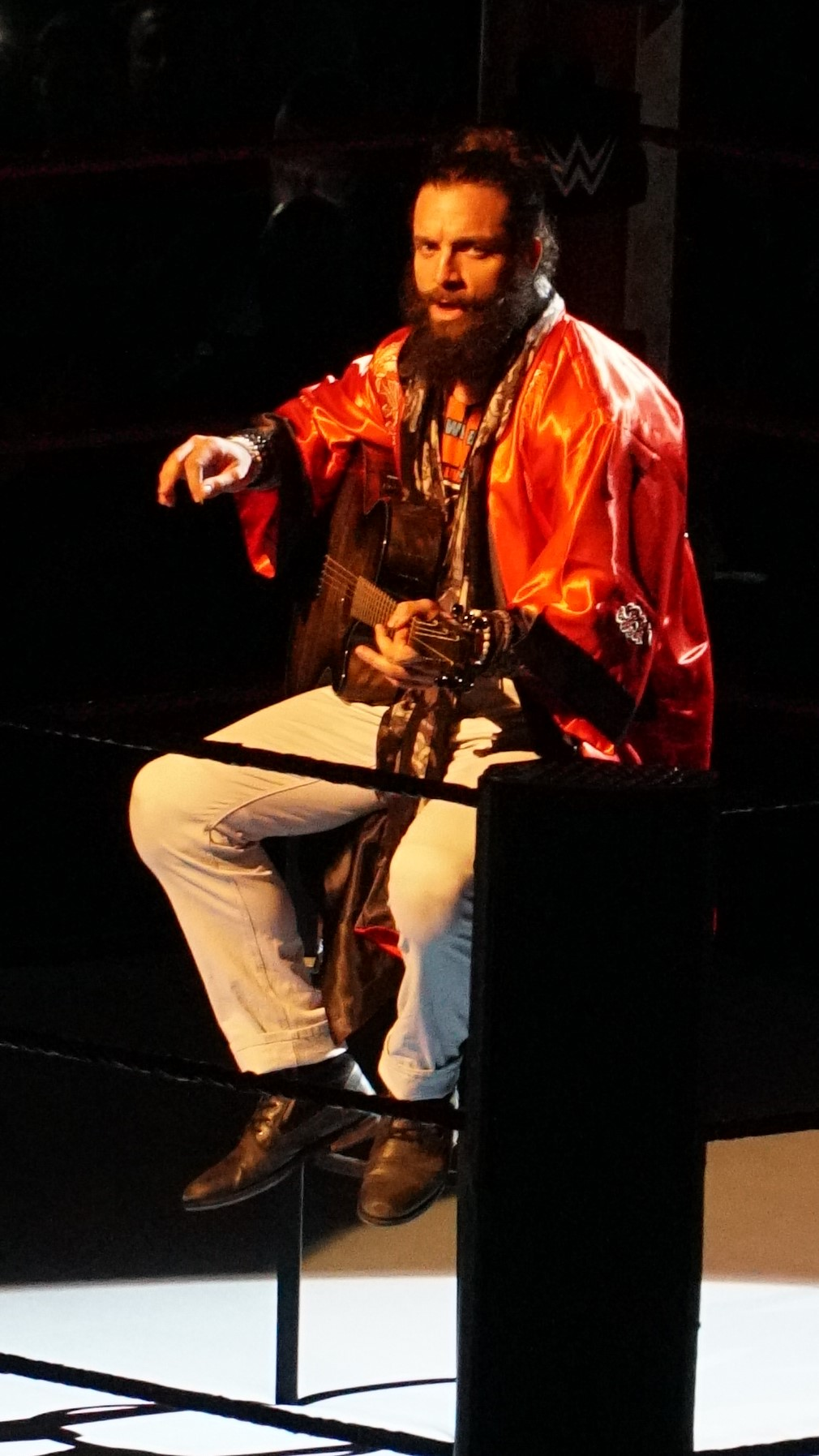
Elias during one of his performances on Raw in April 2018

On January 28, 2018, at the Royal Rumble, Elias entered his first Royal Rumble match at No. 6, lasting 26 minutes before being eliminated by John Cena. On the February 5, 2018 episode of Raw, Elias defeated Braun Strowman and John Cena in a Triple Threat match. Elias competed for the first time in an Elimination Chamber match at the namesake pay–per–view, where he entered last, but was the second participant eliminated by Braun Strowman. Elias also appeared at WrestleMania 34, where he was attacked by Cena. Three weeks later, Elias competed at the Greatest Royal Rumble event, where he entered at No. 20, lasting over 30 minutes and eliminating five wrestlers before being eliminated by Bobby Lashley. Shortly after, Elias started a feud with Seth Rollins, whom he attacked with his guitar after interrupting his performance. The two eventually faced off for the Intercontinental Championship at the Money in the Bank, where Elias lost.

In October, Elias turned face for the first time in his career, as he attacked Baron Corbin with his guitar. Throughout November, Elias started a feud with Bobby Lashley, who would defeat him in different matches via count–out, disqualification or a distraction by his manager Lio Rush. This led to a match at the TLC: Tables, Ladders & Chairs event, where Elias defeated Lashley in a ladder match with a guitar hanging over the ring, after which Lashley would attack him with the guitar after the match. The following night on Raw, Elias would gain revenge as he would attack Lashley with a guitar. This sparked a Miracle on 34th Street Fight between the two, in which Elias was victorious.

At the Royal Rumble on January 27, 2019, Elias entered the Royal Rumble match at entrant 1 and was prepared for a concert before being interrupted by Jeff Jarrett, who proposed a duet. After seemingly accepting, Elias attacked Jarrett with his guitar. Afterwards, as the match officially began, Elias lasted fifteen minutes before being eliminated by the eventual winner Seth Rollins. The following night on Raw, Elias turned heel after insulting the crowd, proclaiming that they disappointed him for lackluster reactions towards him, and was subsequently interrupted by Jeff Jarrett and Road Dogg, who proceeded to sing "With My Baby Tonight" until Elias attacked both men, smashing a guitar over both Jarrett and Road Dogg. On the February 4 episode of Raw, Elias defeated Jeff Jarrett, who wrestled in his first match on Raw since Jarrett left WWE after No Mercy 1999. After the match, Jarrett smashed Elias with his guitar as payback for the previous week. Elias was attacked on both WrestleMania 35 and the Raw after the event by John Cena and The Undertaker respectively during his musical performances.

==== Various alliances and feuds (2019–2021) ====
During the 2019 WWE Superstar Shake-up, Elias was drafted to the SmackDown brand. Just before Elias was to have a musical performance, he was interrupted and attacked by Roman Reigns who was also making his SmackDown debut. The following week, Shane McMahon challenged Reigns to a fight for attacking his father. Reigns came out and was attacked from behind by Elias, who assisted McMahon in beating up Reigns. Elias then challenged Reigns to a match at Money in the Bank, and Reigns accepted. At the event, Elias was defeated by Reigns in 8 seconds. On the May 28 episode of SmackDown Live, Elias pinned R-Truth with the help of McMahon and Drew McIntyre, winning the 24/7 Championship, his first title in WWE. He lost the title in the same night against R-Truth, after a tag team match that also involved Roman Reigns and Drew McIntyre. R-Truth pinned him after the match with the help of Roman Reigns.

The following week at SmackDown Live he defeated again R-Truth in a Lumberjack match for the 24/7 Championship, but in the same episode, while the lumberjacks brawled with each other, Truth pinned him under the ring ending his second reign. Elias participated at the 51-Man Battle Royal at the 2019 Super Showdown but he was the last competitor eliminated by the eventual winner Mansoor. After this, Elias continued his alliance with Shane McMahon and Drew McIntyre, helping them in various feuds and matches. During the special episode WWE Smackville, he was defeated by Shane's new rival Kevin Owens. On August 12, 2019, during the Raw episode post-SummerSlam, Elias pinned R-Truth in the backstage after hitting him with his guitar, regaining the 24/7 Title.

One week later, at SmackDown, Elias participated in the King of the Ring tournament, defeating Kevin Owens during the first match thanks to the help of Shane, who made himself the special referee while the match was in progress and distracted the latter. Elias then lost and regained the 24/7 title on August 23 during the Fox Sports Founder's Day events in Los Angeles, ultimately pinning Fox Sports host Rob Stone on the set of the Fox College Football pregame show immediately after Stone had pinned R-Truth (who had pinned Elias earlier in the day while Elias was doing a concert to kick off the Founder's Day festivities). On August 27 at SmackDown Live, Drake Maverick defeated Elias for the title after the latter was attacked by Kevin Owens. It was announced on September 10, 2019, that Elias was suffering from an ankle injury and was not able to compete in the 2019 King of the Ring semi-final match against Chad Gable. After a two-month hiatus, He returned on November 29, 2019, edition of SmackDown making fun of Drake Maverick, turning face in the process. The next week, he cemented his face turn when he sang with Dana Brooke and attacked Maverick.

Elias participated in the Royal Rumble match at the namesake pay-per-view and entered at No. 2 but was eliminated by the WWE Champion Brock Lesnar. Elias would then begin a feud with King Corbin defeating him at Wrestlemania 36 at Night 1 of the event with a roll-up pin. On the May 15 episode of SmackDown, Elias defeated Corbin again during the first round of the tournament for the vacant Intercontinental Championship. On the May 29 episode of SmackDown, he was unable to continue the tournament when he suffered an injury caused, in storyline, by a car incident. In reality, Elias had suffered a torn pectoral muscle and required surgery rendering him out of action for 6–9 months. As part of the 2020 Draft in October, Elias was drafted to the Raw brand. On the October 12 episode of Raw, he returned from injury and attacked Jeff Hardy by bashing his guitar, turning heel once again. At Hell in a Cell, Elias defeated Hardy by disqualification after Hardy smashed him with his guitar. On the November 2 Raw, Elias was defeated by Hardy in a Guitar on a Pole match and a few weeks later would again be defeated in a Symphony of Destruction match, ending the feud.

In December 2020, Elias formed an alliance with Jaxson Ryker. At the Royal Rumble, Elias would enter his fourth Rumble match at No. 13, eliminating Carlito before being eliminated by Damian Priest. At Fastlane, Elias would replace Shane McMahon in his match against Braun Strowman, in which he was defeated. On the May 31, 2021 episode of Raw, after challenging AJ Styles and Omos for the WWE Raw Tag Team Championship in a losing effort, Elias split up with Ryker. The two would briefly feud until the July 19 episode of Raw, where in a match between the two Ryker was victorious. In August, WWE aired vignettes where Elias burned his guitar, ending the musician character.

==== Ezekiel, return of Elias and release (2022–2023) ====
On the April 4, 2022 episode of Raw after WrestleMania 38, Elias returned to WWE television as a face, sporting a look consisting of a clean shaven face, shorter hair, and trunks, and claiming that he was Ezekiel, the younger brother of Elias. In the following weeks on Raw, Ezekiel entered a feud with Kevin Owens, who refused to believe Ezekiel was really Elias's brother, and thought he was actually Elias himself. At Hell in a Cell, Ezekiel lost to Owens. On the June 20 episode of Raw, the two brothers "reunited" in a doctored backstage segment. Later that night, Elias appeared to perform a concert, before being interrupted by Owens. Still refusing to believe that the brothers were different people, Owens challenged Ezekiel, Elias or "even their younger brother Elrod" to a match. On the August 8 episode of Raw, Owens stretchered Ezekiel out of the arena after attacking him with an Apron Powerbomb, ending their feud. On September 16, the Ezekiel gimmick was scrapped and Sciullo would revert back to his Elias gimmick, returning on the October 17 episode of Raw. He went undrafted in the 2023 WWE Draft, and was released from his WWE contract on September 21, 2023.

=== Return to independent circuit (2024–present) ===
On January 1, 2024, Sciullo posted a video on his Twitter account to promote his new gimmick, named Elijah. On February 18, 2024, Elijah wrestled his first match since leaving WWE at Wrestling Revolver in a losing effort against Mike Bailey.

On February 3, 2025, Elijah revealed, via a video posted to his Twitter account, he had joined the Ring of Honor (ROH) tag team The Righteous alongside Vincent and Dutch, becoming The Righteous Ones. On February 7, it was reported by Dave Meltzer of the Wrestling Observer Newsletter that Elijah had signed a deal with ROH. However on February 12, Fightful Select contradicted Meltzer's report stating that Elijah was not signed to ROH.

=== Total Nonstop Action Wrestling (2025–present) ===
On the February 20, 2025 episode of Impact!, Elijah made his surprise debut for Total Nonstop Action Wrestling (TNA), saving TNA World Champion Joe Hendry from an attack by The Colons. Later that night, Elijah would team with Hendry to defeat The Colons in a tag team match. It was later announced that Elias has signed with TNA. On the March 6 episode of Impact!, he defeated The System's Brian Myers At Sacrifice, Elijah along with Joe Hendry, Matt Hardy, Leon Slater, and Nic Nemeth defeated The System (Eddie Edwards, Brian Myers, and JDC) and The Colons in a Steel Cage 10-man tag team match. At Rebellion, Elijah defeated Shane Haste, who accepted Elijah's open challenge.

At Under Siege, Elijah would team with Joe Hendry to defeat the team of Trick Williams and Frankie Kazarian. Following Trick Williams' TNA World Title win at NXT Battleground, it was announced that Elijah would face Trick Williams for the TNA World Championship at Against All Odds. At the event, Elijah would be defeated by Trick Williams.

=== Return to WWE (2025) ===
Sciullo, under his Elijah name, made his return to WWE on the May 6, 2025 episode of NXT, participating in a battle royal to determine the number one contender for NXT Champion Oba Femi, where he eliminated Charlie Dempsey and Trick Williams before being eliminated by Shawn Spears.

== Personal life ==
Scuillo is a born-again Christian. At fifteen years old, he received his first guitar as a gift from his father, an event that marked the beginning of his musical journey. He taught himself playing the guitar, initially learning songs by artists such as Eric Clapton. Sciullo described music as something that came naturally to him. Over time, his musical abilities expanded to include the piano, drums, and harmonica, which would later become an integral part of his “Elias” and “Elijah” characters, with Sciullo expressing interest in incorporating a wider range of instruments into those characters.

== Discography ==
=== Extended plays ===
- WWE: Walk with Elias (2018)
- WWE: Universal Truth (2020)

== Championships and accomplishments ==
- International Wrestling Cartel
  - IWC World Heavyweight Championship (1 time)
  - IWC Super Indy Championship (2 times)
- Pro Wrestling Illustrated
  - Ranked No. 69 of the top 500 singles wrestlers in the PWI 500 in 2018
- WWE
  - WWE 24/7 Championship (4 times)
  - Slammy Award (1 time)
    - Musical Performance of the Year (2020) Elias's live performance of Universal Truth on Raw (October 19)
  - WWE Year-End Award (1 time)
    - Breakout Superstar of the Year (2018)
