= CFO$ =

American musical duo

- Also known as: Arcadia; Kromestatik
- Origin: Long Island, New York, U.S.
- Occupation(s): Producers, songwriters, composers, mix engineers
- Instrument(s): Vocals, guitar, drums, piano, production
- Years active: 2012–2020
- Labels: WWE Music Group, Arcade Songs
- Past members: John Paul Alicastro; Michael Conrad "Mike" Lauri

CFO$ (/ˌsiːɛfˈoʊs/) were an American songwriting and production duo consisting of John Paul Alicastro and Michael Conrad Lauri. They were primarily known for creating entrance music and program themes for World Wrestling Entertainment (WWE).

== Career ==
CFO$ joined forces with the WWE through Arcade Songs, a record label owned by Gregg Wattenberg, when it was named Wind-Up Records back in 2012. They made their musical debut on the special 1,000th episode edition of WWE Monday Night Raw, named WWE Raw 1000, which aired on July 23, 2012, when their song "The Night" was selected as the show's official main theme. Shortly after, they began contributing themes for main roster WWE talent.

The duo acted as WWE Music Group's executive producers and were the driving creative force behind the WWE's music department until early 2020. During their tenure, they secured two number one singles in the iTunes Soundtrack category with "The Rising Sun" for Shinsuke Nakamura and "Glorious Domination" for Bobby Roode. They further contributed theme songs and original scores to shows and programming which aired on the WWE Network.

In February 2020, it was publicly reported that CFO$ had been in a dispute with their publisher over the previous month, due to money CFO$ states was owed to them per their publishing deal. CFO$ attempted to have WWE buy them out of their publishing deal and have them work in-house but the publisher rejected the proposal. In August 2020, CFO$ were released from their recording contract and disbanded shortly afterwards. All of the production input has since been replaced by def rebel.

== Television appearances ==
=== Television ===
Year	Title	Role	Notes
2015	Total Divas	Themselves; Alicastro and Lauri	Episode: "It's a Beautiful Life?"

=== Web ===
Year	Title	Role	Notes
2018	WWE Ride Along	Themselves; Alicastro and Lauri	Episode: "Ballad of Elias and Balor Club"
2018	Walk with Elias: The Documentary	Themselves; Alicastro and Lauri	WWE Network mockumentary

== See also ==
- Music in professional wrestling
