= SummerSlam (2014) =

WWE pay-per-view and livestreaming event

- Promotional poster featuring John Cena and Brock Lesnar
- Promotion: WWE
- Date: August 17, 2014
- City: Los Angeles, California
- Venue: Staples Center
- Attendance: 17,357
- Buy rate: 147,000 (excluding WWE Network views)

WWE event chronology
← Previous; Battleground	Next → NXT TakeOver: Fatal 4-Way

SummerSlam chronology
← Previous; 2013	Next → 2015

The 2014 SummerSlam was a professional wrestling pay-per-view (PPV) and livestreaming event produced by WWE. It was the 27th annual SummerSlam and took place on August 17, 2014, at the Staples Center in Los Angeles, California. This was the sixth and final consecutive SummerSlam event to take place at the arena.

Eight professional wrestling matches were scheduled on the event's main card and one match took place on the Kickoff pre-show. The main event saw Brock Lesnar defeat John Cena to win the WWE World Heavyweight Championship for a fourth time and marked the final appearance of the Big Gold Belt, which had been used in tandem with the Big Scratch Logo belt since December 2013 to represent the WWE World Heavyweight Championship; on the following night's Raw, both belts were replaced with a singular belt, referred to as the Network Logo Belt. This was the first of six consecutive SummerSlams in which Lesnar competed in the main event match. In other prominent matches, Seth Rollins defeated Dean Ambrose in a lumberjack match, Stephanie McMahon defeated Brie Bella, and Roman Reigns defeated Randy Orton.

This was the first SummerSlam to livestream on the WWE Network, which launched in February. The event had 147,000 pay-per-view buys (excluding WWE Network views), down from the previous year's 296,000 buys. It was also WWE's first PPV and livestreaming event to incorporate WWE's current logo but it would not be used on air and on the turnbuckle pads until the next night on Raw, including all championship belts being updated with the new logo.

== Production ==
=== Background ===
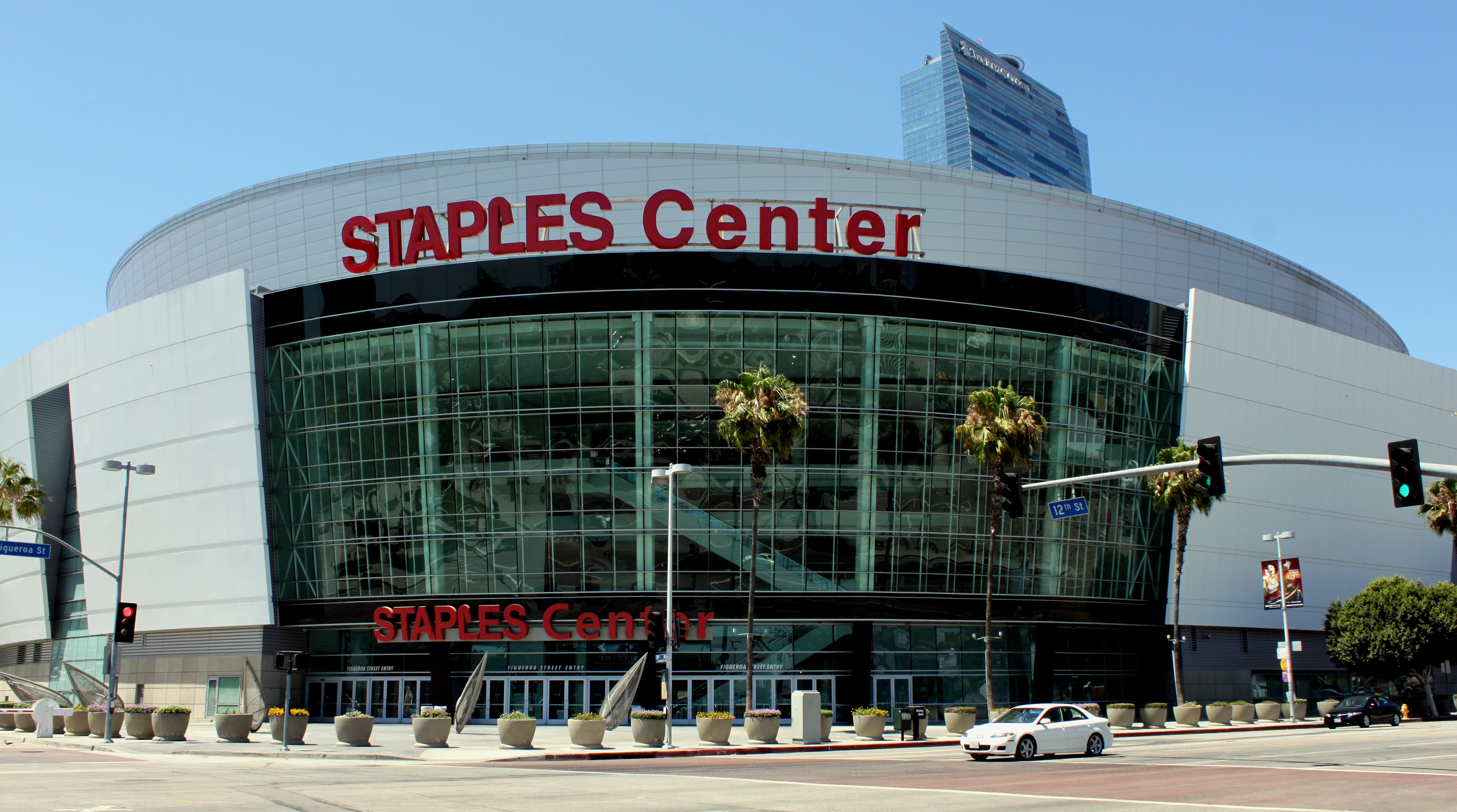
The 27th annual SummerSlam was the sixth and final consecutive time for the event to be held at the Staples Center in Los Angeles, California.

SummerSlam is an annual professional wrestling pay-per-view (PPV) produced every August by WWE since 1988. Dubbed "The Biggest Party of the Summer", it is one of the promotion's original four pay-per-views, along with WrestleMania, Royal Rumble, and Survivor Series, referred to as the "Big Four". It has since become considered WWE's second biggest event of the year behind WrestleMania. Announced on February 27, 2014, the 27th SummerSlam was scheduled to be held on August 17, 2014, at Staples Center in Los Angeles, California for the sixth consecutive year. Tickets went on sale on March 15. In addition to airing on traditional PPV, it was the first SummerSlam to livestream on the WWE Network, which launched in February.

=== Storylines ===
The event comprised nine matches, including one on the Kickoff pre-show, that resulted from scripted storylines. Results were predetermined by WWE's writers, while storylines were produced on WWE's weekly television programs, Raw and SmackDown.

At Payback, Brie Bella quit WWE after her husband Daniel Bryan was given an ultimatum by the principal owner of WWE Stephanie McMahon to either forfeit the WWE World Heavyweight Championship or have Brie fired. Brie decided to quit and slapped Stephanie in the face. After that incident, McMahon would repeatedly put Brie's twin sister Nikki Bella in matches which invariably ended with Nikki being beaten down. On the July 21 episode of Raw, Brie returned to WWE as a fan in the audience to support her sister, but was slapped in the face by McMahon, who came to ringside to confront her. Later that night, Stephanie was arrested by the police for assault and battery, due to Brie not being part of WWE's roster. The next week on Raw, Brie confronted Stephanie and said that she would drop the charges as long as Stephanie rehired her and accepted her challenge to a match at SummerSlam, which Stephanie accepted. On the August 11 episode of Raw, Stephanie brought in Megan Miller, Bryan's physical therapist, who confessed to having an affair with her client. An infuriated Brie stormed into the ring and slapped Megan before attacking Stephanie. Later that night, Brie was arrested by the police after Stephanie revealed that Megan was pressing charges against her.

At Battleground, AJ Lee defeated Paige to retain the WWE Divas Championship. On the July 21 episode of Raw, Paige attacked AJ after they defeated Emma and Natalya. On the July 28 episode, AJ confronted and attacked Paige. On the August 1 episode of SmackDown, after AJ defeated Rosa Mendes, Paige attacked AJ and threw her off the stage ramp, resulting in AJ suffering a whiplash injury. On August 4, it was announced on WWE.com that AJ would defend the title against Paige at SummerSlam.

On the June 30 episode of Raw, Chris Jericho made his unexpected return to WWE, only to be attacked by The Wyatt Family. This led to a match at Battleground, where Jericho defeated Bray Wyatt. On the July 21 episode of Raw, Jericho was to have Wyatt on his Highlight Reel show, but the Wyatt Family attacked Jericho in the locker room. On the July 28 episode, Triple H made the official announcement of the Wyatt-Jericho rematch at SummerSlam. On the August 1 edition of SmackDown, Jericho defeated Erick Rowan, banning Rowan from ringside during the match at SummerSlam as per match stipulation. On the August 4 edition of Raw, Jericho defeated Luke Harper by disqualification due to interference by Wyatt, causing Harper to be banned from ringside.

At Battleground, John Cena defeated Randy Orton, Kane, and Roman Reigns to retain the WWE World Heavyweight Championship. The following night on Raw, Brock Lesnar returned to WWE and was chosen by WWE COO Triple H to face Cena at SummerSlam for the championship.

At Battleground, Rusev defeated Jack Swagger by countout. On the July 22 edition of Main Event, Swagger defeated Rusev by disqualification after Rusev hit Swagger with a Russian flag. On the August 1 edition of SmackDown, after Swagger defeated Cesaro, Lana came out along with Rusev and challenged Swagger to a Flag match at SummerSlam on Rusev's behalf, which Zeb Colter accepted on Swagger's behalf.

At Battleground, The Miz won a 19-man battle royal to win the vacated WWE Intercontinental Championship, last eliminating Dolph Ziggler. On the July 21 episode of Raw, Ziggler defeated Miz in a non-title match. On the July 28 episode, Ziggler and The Usos (Jey Uso and Jimmy Uso) defeated Miz and RybAxel. On August 4, it was announced on WWE.com that Miz would defend the title against Ziggler at SummerSlam.

At Battleground, Seth Rollins defeated Dean Ambrose by forfeit when Ambrose was ejected out of the arena by Triple H for attacking Rollins before the match. On the August 4 episode of Raw, Triple H announced that Ambrose and Rollins would face off at SummerSlam. Triple H also announced that Ambrose and Rollins would face Alberto Del Rio and Rob Van Dam respectively in Beat the Clock challenge matches, and the winner would choose the stipulation for the match at SummerSlam. Ambrose defeated Del Rio to set a time of 15:42. Van Dam was switched out at the last minute for Heath Slater, who defeated Rollins, thus giving Ambrose the right to choose. On the August 8 episode of Smackdown, Ambrose announced that their match at SummerSlam would be a Lumberjack match.

On the July 21 episode of Raw, Roman Reigns defeated Kane and Randy Orton in a handicap match and attacked Orton during Triple H's announcement on who would face John Cena at SummerSlam for the WWE World Heavyweight Championship. On the July 28 episode, Orton attacked Reigns before his scheduled match against Kane. On the August 1 episode of SmackDown, Orton challenged Reigns to a match at SummerSlam. On August 4, it was announced on WWE.com that Orton would face Reigns at SummerSlam.

On August 16, it was announced on WWE.com that Cesaro would face Rob Van Dam on the SummerSlam Kickoff show.

== Event ==
Other on-screen personnel
Role:	Name:
English commentators	Michael Cole
English commentators	Jerry Lawler
English commentators	John "Bradshaw" Layfield
Spanish commentators	Carlos Cabrera
Spanish commentators	Marcelo Rodriguez
Backstage interviewer	Tom Phillips
Ring announcers	Justin Roberts
Ring announcers	Lilian Garcia
Referees	Mike Chioda
Referees	Charles Robinson
Referees	Darrick Moore
Referees	Chad Patton
Referees	Ryan Tran
Referees	Rod Zapata
Pre-show panel	Renee Young
Pre-show panel	Booker T
Pre-show panel	Ric Flair
Pre-show panel	Alex Riley

=== Pre-Show ===
The SummerSlam Kickoff pre-show match saw Rob Van Dam defeat Cesaro with a Five-Star Frog Splash. An analytical show which was hosted by Renee Young consisted of a pre-show panel that contained Booker T, Alex Riley, and Ric Flair. Hulk Hogan also made an appearance at the event before the main card got underway, promoting the WWE Network to the audience.

=== Miscellaneous ===
The English commentators were Michael Cole, Jerry Lawler, and John "Bradshaw" Layfield, with Spanish and German commentators also at ringside. Lilian Garcia and Justin Roberts were the ring announcers while Tom Phillips conducted backstage interviews.

UFC's Ronda Rousey, Jessamyn Duke, Marina Shafir, and Shayna Baszler (known as "The 4 HorseWomen of MMA") were all present at SummerSlam.

The cast of Pitch Perfect also appeared at the event, quite notably Adam DeVine, Anna Kendrick, Chrissie Fit, Kelley Jakle, and Brittany Snow, with the latter being seen in a backstage segment with Lana.

=== Main card ===
The actual pay-per-view opened with The Miz defending the WWE Intercontinental Championship against Dolph Ziggler. The ending saw Miz executed a Skull Crushing Finale on Ziggler for a near-fall. Ziggler executed a Zig Zag on Miz to win the title.

Next, AJ Lee defended the WWE Divas Championship against Paige. The match ended when AJ applied the Black Widow on Paige, who countered the Black Widow into a Ram Paige to win the title.

After that, Rusev faced Jack Swagger in a flag match. Rusev attempted to attack Swagger before the match but Swagger countered into the Patriot Lock, thus weakening Rusev's ankle. In the end, Swagger passed out to the Accolade, meaning Rusev won by technical submission. Following the match, Rusev assaulted Zeb Colter while he was tending to the fallen Swagger and the National Anthem of Russia was played for Rusev.

In the fourth match, Seth Rollins faced Dean Ambrose in a lumberjack match. After both men fought in the arena stands and assaulted the lumberjacks at ringside, Kane came out to try and restore order. Ambrose executed a Curb Stomp on Rollins but Kane interfered and broke up the pinfall, starting a brawl involving all the lumberjacks. Rollins hit a distracted Ambrose with the Money in the Bank briefcase to win the match.

Next, Chris Jericho faced Bray Wyatt, with Luke Harper and Erick Rowan banned from ringside. Jericho executed a Codebreaker on Wyatt for a near-fall. In the end, Wyatt executed a Sister Abigail into the barricade on Jericho. Wyatt executed another Sister Abigail on Jericho to win the match.

After that, Stephanie McMahon faced Brie Bella. Stephanie dominated the start of the match and countered a suicide-dive attempt by slamming Brie's face into the mat. Stephanie performed a DDT for a near-fall. Brie eventually gained the advantage and performed a missile-dropkick on Stephanie for a near-fall. Following this, Triple H appeared, followed by Nikki Bella. Triple H pulled the referee out of the ring as Brie applied the Yes! Lock, leading to Brie performing a baseball slide on him. Nikki then entered the ring, seemingly to prevent Stephanie from escaping, but instead attacked her sister, turning heel. Stephanie then executed a Pedigree on Brie to win the match.

In the penultimate match, Randy Orton faced Roman Reigns. After back-and-forth action, Reigns executed a Superman Punch and attempted a Spear but Orton countered with a Snap Scoop Powerslam for a near-fall. Reigns attempted a Leaping Clothesline but Orton countered with an RKO for a near fall. Orton attempted a Punt Kick but Reigns countered and executed a Spear to win the match.

=== Main event ===
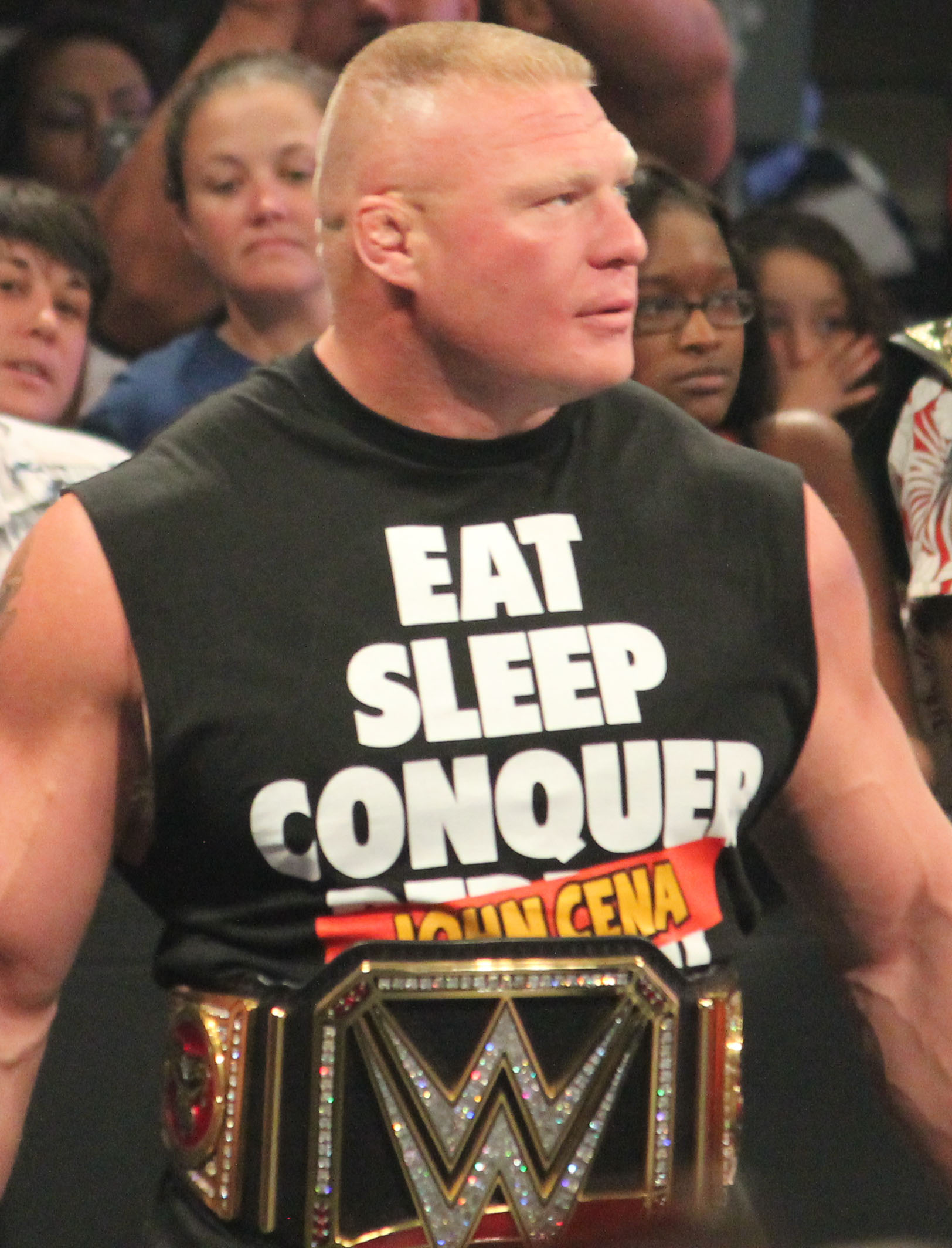
Brock Lesnar became a four-time WWE World Heavyweight Champion at the event, shown here with the updated design that was presented to him on the August 18, 2014, episode of Raw.

In the main event, John Cena defended his WWE World Heavyweight Championship against Brock Lesnar (accompanied by Paul Heyman). In the first 30 seconds of the match, Lesnar executed an F-5 on Cena for a near-fall. After, the match was a one-sided beatdown. Lesnar executed 2 German suplexes and a vertical suplex on Cena. Cena in turn managed only brief and ineffective offense. Lesnar executed another 4 German suplexes and then went for the cover on Cena, who kicked out at two. Lesnar once again executed 2 German suplexes on him. As he attempted a third, Cena struck his head with an elbow. As Lesnar attempted a second F-5, Cena countered and executed an Attitude Adjustment for a near-fall. Lesnar then proceeded to sit up (mimicking The Undertaker) and laugh. He executed 7 more German suplexes on Cena, this time not releasing him at some points. Cena applied the STF on Lesnar but Lesnar escaped and executed a second F-5 to win the title.

== Reception ==
The event received positive reviews. The main event match between Lesnar and Cena received 4.25 stars out of five from Dave Meltzer, the best of the event. The Reigns and Orton match received four stars, the Lumberjack Match received 3.75 stars, and the Kickoff match received 3.25 stars.

== Aftermath ==
The following night on Raw, Stephanie McMahon came out to Daniel Bryan's entrance theme to celebrate her victory. She also invited Nikki Bella out to address her betraying Brie Bella. Nikki said she and Brie were supposed to be a team, but that she had felt betrayed by Brie's actions in quitting the company at Payback. Brie came out and confronted Nikki, but Nikki said she would never forgive her and slapped Brie across the face (cementing her heel turn), leaving Brie in tears.

On the same event, Seth Rollins fell victim to a surprise Ice Bucket Challenge and beating from Dean Ambrose during an interview segment. Triple H then set up a SummerSlam rematch in order to 'finish off' Ambrose, with WWE's fans voting on the stipulation; the vote was made for a Falls Count Anywhere match. Ambrose was closing in on a victory when Kane (who had been sitting at ringside) once again interfered and set up Ambrose for Rollins' Curb Stomp through a pile of concrete blocks next to the announce table. Rollins was awarded the victory via knockout and Ambrose was stretchered out of the arena. Ambrose was then reported to have refused treatment and 'gone missing' afterwards. The storyline was put to place to allow Ambrose's absence from television in order to film the movie 12 Rounds 3: Lockdown.

Also on Raw, Dolph Ziggler defended his newly won Intercontinental Championship against The Miz. Miz won the match via count-out when Ziggler fell to the floor, thus Ziggler retained the title.

The Authority revealed a new belt (subsequently retiring the Big Gold Belt) to represent the WWE World Heavyweight Championship which was presented to Brock Lesnar. On the August 19 episode of Main Event, Triple H announced later that John Cena would invoke his rematch clause at Night of Champions.

After winning back the Divas Championship, Paige and AJ Lee continued their rivalry, with AJ twice distracting Paige and thus causing Paige to lose during matches against Natalya. The Authority made a triple threat match, adding Nikki Bella set for Night of Champions.

On the August 25 episode of Raw, Cesaro defeated Rob Van Dam in a rematch to become the number one contender for Sheamus' United States Championship. The match was officially confirmed by WWE on August 29 when it was announced that the championship match would take place at Night of Champions.

After defeating Jack Swagger in a flag match, Rusev was celebrating his victory until he was attacked by Mark Henry. In the ensuing weeks, they would interfere in each other's matches. Henry then challenged Rusev to a match at Night of Champions vowing to be the first to beat Rusev.

Chris Jericho's feud with Bray Wyatt ended on the September 8 episode of Raw, with Wyatt defeating Jericho in a Steel Cage match.

Also on the September 8 episode, Roman Reigns defeated Randy Orton by disqualification in a rematch after Rollins and Kane interfered. The steel cage used in the Wyatt vs. Jericho match was lowered. In the cage, Reigns initially gained the upper hand on Orton before Rollins and Kane were able to get in. Orton hit Reigns with a steel chair that Rollins retrieved under the ring and Rollins performed a curb stomp on Reigns onto the chair.

== Results ==
No.	Results	Stipulations	Times
1^{P}	Rob Van Dam defeated Cesaro by pinfall	Singles match	8:06
2	Dolph Ziggler defeated The Miz (c) by pinfall	Singles match for the WWE Intercontinental Championship	7:57
3	Paige defeated AJ Lee (c) by pinfall	Singles match for the WWE Divas Championship	4:55
4	Rusev (with Lana) defeated Jack Swagger (with Zeb Colter) by technical submission	Flag match	9:01
5	Seth Rollins defeated Dean Ambrose by pinfall	Lumberjack match (Note: The lumberjacks were: Big E, Bo Dallas, Cesaro, Curtis Axel, Damien Sandow, Erick Rowan, Fandango, Goldust, Heath Slater, Jey Uso, Jimmy Uso, Kane, Kofi Kingston, Luke Harper, R-Truth, Rob Van Dam, Ryback, Sin Cara, Stardust, and Titus O'Neil.)	10:51
6	Bray Wyatt defeated Chris Jericho by pinfall	Singles match	12:53
7	Stephanie McMahon defeated Brie Bella by pinfall	Singles match	11:06
8	Roman Reigns defeated Randy Orton by pinfall	Singles match	16:30
9	Brock Lesnar defeated John Cena (c) by pinfall	Singles match for the WWE World Heavyweight Championship	15:53
(c) / – the champion(s) heading into the match; P / – the match was broadcast on the pre-show
