= Royal Rumble (2026) =

WWE premium live event

Royal Rumble رويال رامبل 2026 (Arabic)
- Promotional poster featuring various WWE wrestlers
- Promotion: WWE
- Brand(s): NXT; Raw; SmackDown
- Date: January 31, 2026
- City: Riyadh, Saudi Arabia
- Venue: Riyadh Season Stadium at King Abdullah Financial District
- Attendance: 25,000

WWE event chronology
← Previous; Saturday Night's Main Event XLIII	Next → Elimination Chamber

Royal Rumble chronology
← Previous; 2025	Next → 2027

WWE in Saudi Arabia chronology
← Previous; Night of Champions	Next → Night of Champions

The 2026 Royal Rumble, also promoted as Royal Rumble: Riyadh (Arabic: رويال رامبل, romanized: ruyal rambil), was a professional wrestling premium live event (PLE) produced by the American company WWE, held for wrestlers from the promotion's Raw, SmackDown, and NXT brand divisions. It was the 39th annual Royal Rumble event and took place on Saturday, January 31, 2026, at Riyadh Season Stadium, a purpose-built temporary outdoor stadium in the King Abdullah Financial District in Riyadh, Saudi Arabia. The event was held as part of the city's annual Riyadh Season festivities and aired live at 10:00 p.m. Arabia Standard Time (2:00 p.m. Eastern Time).

This was the first traditional Royal Rumble to take place outside of North America, the 14th event WWE held in Saudi Arabia as part of its 10-year partnership in support of Saudi Vision 2030, the second to feature a Royal Rumble match after the Greatest Royal Rumble in April 2018, which was a non-traditional 50-man match, and the first of WWE's "Big Five" events to take place in the country. It was also the first Royal Rumble to livestream on ESPN Unlimited in the United States, as well as the last on the WWE Network in any country as the last few countries that were still on the service due to pre-existing contracts merged under Netflix on April 1. It would also be the last on Abema in Japan, which subsequently merged under Netflix on October 1.

The event was based around the Royal Rumble match, a modified 30-person battle royal in which the participants enter at timed intervals instead of all beginning in the ring at the same time and the respective men's and women's winners received a world championship match at WrestleMania. For the 2026 event, the men's and women's winners received a choice of which championship to challenge for at WrestleMania 42. The men's winner could choose to challenge for Raw's World Heavyweight Championship or SmackDown's Undisputed WWE Championship, while the women had the choice between Raw's Women's World Championship and SmackDown's WWE Women's Championship. The 2026 Men's Royal Rumble match, which was the main event of the card, was won by SmackDown's Roman Reigns, who last eliminated Raw's Gunther, marking his second Royal Rumble victory, after 2015, and making him the 12th overall two-time winner. The 2026 Women's Royal Rumble match, which was the opening bout, was won by Raw's Liv Morgan, who last eliminated SmackDown's Tiffany Stratton.

In addition to the two Royal Rumble matches, two other matches were contested on the main card, as well as two dark matches before the event. The other two televised matches were featured matches for Raw and SmackDown, respectively. For Raw, Gunther defeated AJ Styles by technical submission in a Career Threatening match, forcing Styles to retire, while in SmackDown's match, Drew McIntyre defeated Sami Zayn to retain the Undisputed WWE Championship. The event also saw the debut of Royce Keys, formerly known as Powerhouse Hobbs in All Elite Wrestling, as well as the returns of Brie Bella, Tiffany Stratton, and Chad Gable, the latter as the original El Grande Americano, and the final Royal Rumble appearance of Brock Lesnar as an in-ring performer due to his retirement from professional wrestling in August 2026. The men's Royal Rumble match also saw special appearances of wrestlers from WWE's Mexican sister promotion Lucha Libre AAA Worldwide (AAA), which WWE acquired in 2025 and marked the first time that AAA wrestlers appeared in WWE's Royal Rumble match since 1997.

== Production ==
=== Background ===
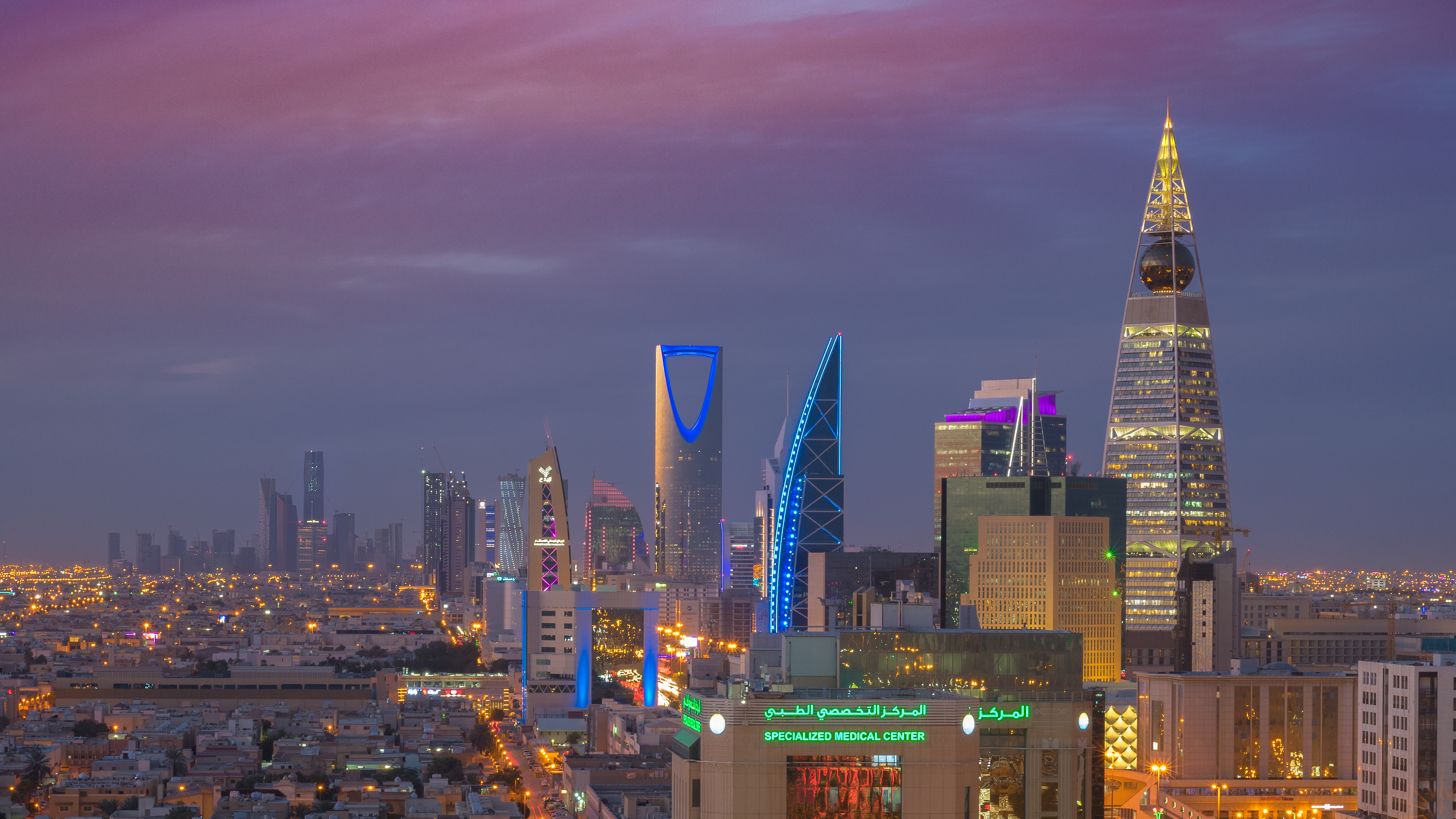
The 39th annual Royal Rumble event was held at the Riyadh Season Stadium, a purpose-built temporary stadium in the King Abdullah Financial District in Riyadh, Saudi Arabia (pictured), marking the first traditional Royal Rumble event to take place outside of North America.

The Royal Rumble is an annual professional wrestling premium live event (PLE), traditionally held in January by the American company WWE since 1988; that first event was a television special before it became a pay-per-view (PPV) event beginning in 1989 and then also simulcast on WWE's livestreaming platforms since 2015. It is one of the promotion's original four PPVs, along with WrestleMania, SummerSlam, and Survivor Series, referred to as the "Big Four", and as of August 2021, it is considered one of the "Big Five", along with Money in the Bank. It is named after and centered on the Royal Rumble match.

From 1988 up through the 2025 event, the Royal Rumble was held annually in North America, with the inaugural 1988 event in Canada and the rest in the United States. In early 2018, WWE began a 10-year strategic multiplatform partnership with the Ministry of Sport (formerly General Sports Authority) in support of Saudi Vision 2030, Saudi Arabia's social and economic reform program. The first PLE in this partnership was an event titled the Greatest Royal Rumble, which featured a 50-man Royal Rumble match. In May 2024, the chairman of Saudi Arabia's General Entertainment Authority, Turki Alalshikh, announced that the country was in talks with WWE to bring either the Royal Rumble or WrestleMania to the country in 2026 or 2027. On January 3, 2025, PWInsider reported that WWE would be holding the 2026 Royal Rumble in Saudi Arabia, with Fightful later confirming an official announcement would come during the Raw premiere on Netflix.

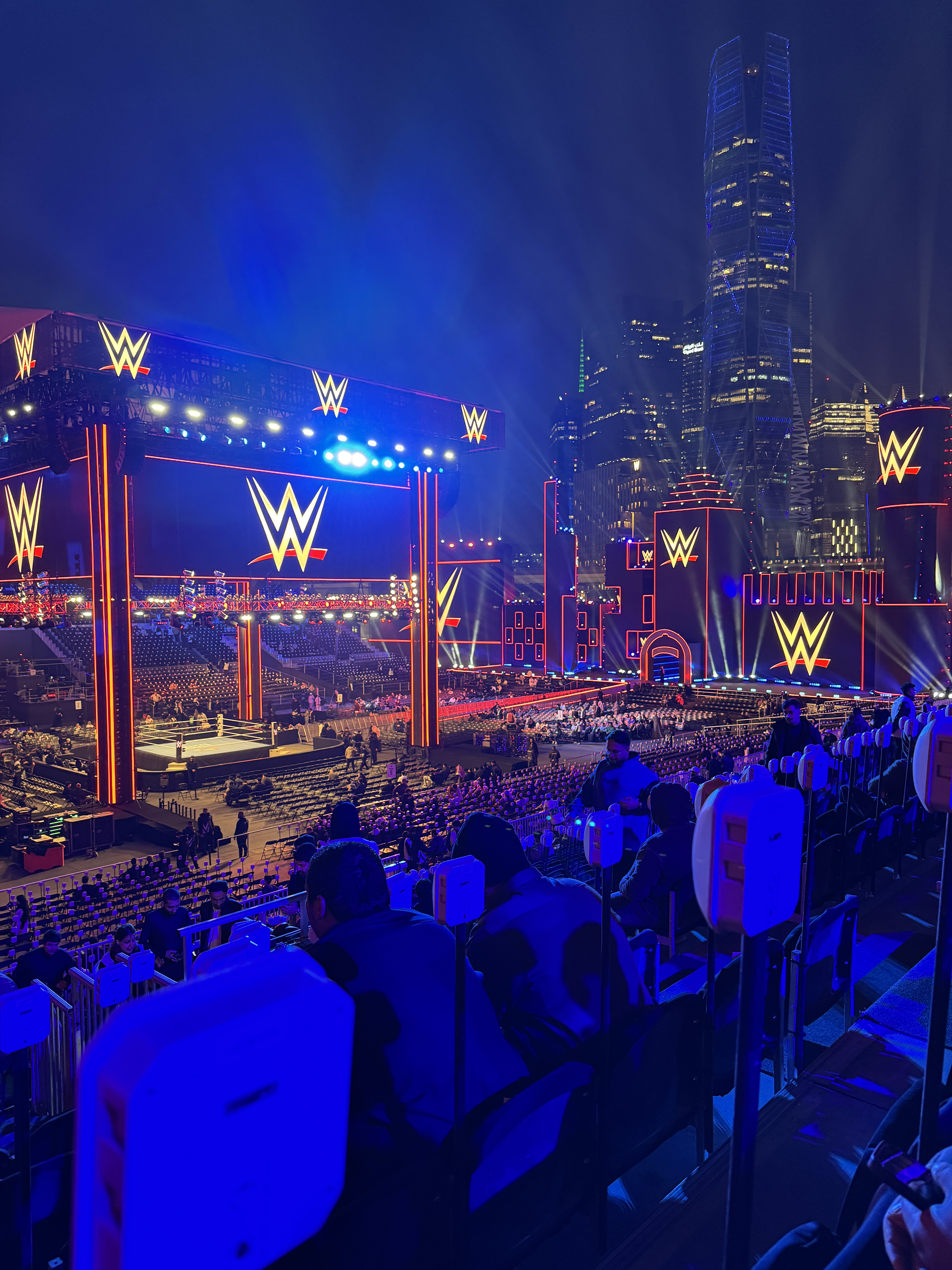
The event was held at the Riyadh Season Stadium, a purpose-built temporary outdoor stadium in the King Abdullah Financial District. The preceding night's episode of SmackDown was also held here.

Ahead of the Netflix debut, WWE officially confirmed that the 39th Royal Rumble, and 14th event in the Saudi Arabian partnership, would be happening in Riyadh in January 2026 as part of the 2025–2026 Riyadh Season, an annual series of entertainment events that typically hosts WWE's Crown Jewel; with the scheduling of the 2026 Royal Rumble, the 2025 Crown Jewel was moved to Perth, Australia as a result. It was later confirmed that it would be held on Saturday, January 31 at a purpose-built temporary outdoor stadium called the Riyadh Season Stadium in the King Abdullah Financial District. With the 2026 Royal Rumble in Saudi Arabia, the 2026 calendar year hosted three events in the country instead of two, as 2025 only had one (Night of Champions). This also returned the Royal Rumble to its traditional January slot as the 2025 event was held in February. The event primarily featured wrestlers from the Raw and SmackDown brands, with NXT wrestlers also participating in the Royal Rumble matches. The January 30 episode of Friday Night SmackDown was also held at the same venue. The main theme song was "Heavy Is the Crown" by Linkin Park.

The Royal Rumble match is a modified battle royal in which the participants enter at timed intervals instead of all beginning in the ring at the same time, and the match generally features 30 wrestlers. Since 1993, the winner traditionally earns a world championship match at that year's WrestleMania. For 2026, the men and women could choose to challenge for either Raw or SmackDown's top championship at WrestleMania 42: the men had their choice between Raw's World Heavyweight Championship Championship or SmackDown's Undisputed WWE Championship, while the women could choose either Raw's Women's World Championship or SmackDown's WWE Women's Championship.

=== Broadcast outlets ===
The PLE was broadcast on traditional PPV outlets worldwide. It was also available to livestream on ESPN Unlimited in the United States, the WWE Network in Austria, Germany, Italy, and Switzerland, SuperSport in Sub-Saharan Africa, Abema in Japan, and Netflix everywhere else. This was the first Royal Rumble to livestream on ESPN's app in the United States, as WWE's contract with Peacock to air main roster PLEs expired at the conclusion of Clash in Paris in August 2025. With the event being held in Saudi Arabia, it aired live at 10:00 p.m. Arabia Standard Time (2:00 p.m. Eastern Time).

=== Storylines ===
The event included four matches that resulted from scripted storylines. Results were predetermined by WWE's writers on the Raw and SmackDown brands, while storylines were produced on WWE's weekly television shows, Monday Night Raw and Friday Night SmackDown.

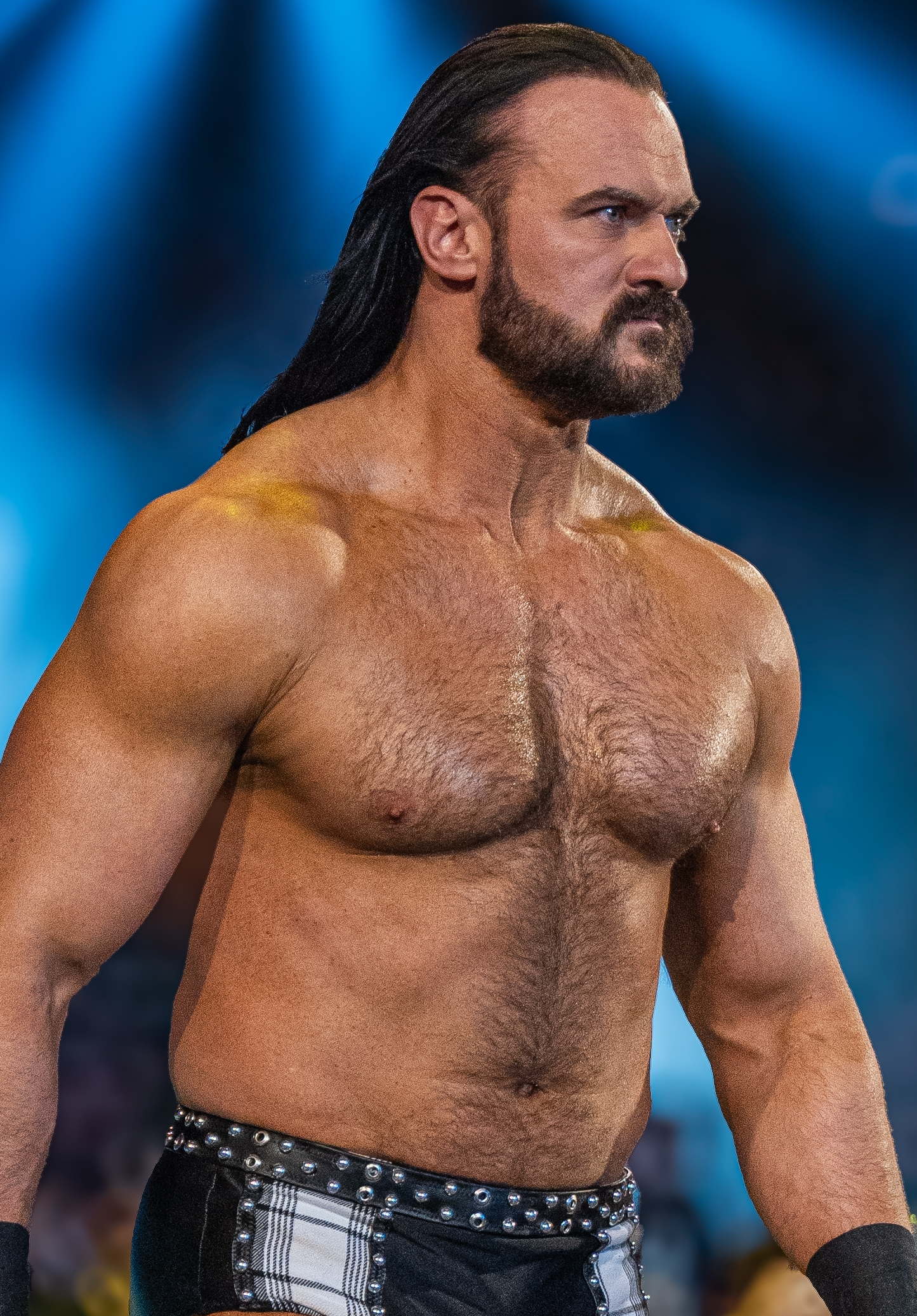
Due to his first two reigns taking place during the COVID-19 pandemic, Drew McIntyre's defense of SmackDown's Undisputed WWE Championship against Sami Zayn at the event was his first televised defense of the title in front of a live audience.

On the January 9 episode of SmackDown, the brand's General Manager Nick Aldis announced that a tournament would begin the following week, with eight wrestlers competing against each other in four singles matches, with the winners advancing to a fatal four-way match at Saturday Night's Main Event XLIII, and the winner of that bout would earn an Undisputed WWE Championship match at the Royal Rumble. Later that night, Drew McIntyre defeated Cody Rhodes to win the title, confirming his status as the defending champion. At Saturday Night's Main Event XLIII on January 24, Sami Zayn won the fatal four-way. Additionally, as McIntyre's win over Rhodes had an extra stipulation in that Rhodes would not receive an automatic rematch for the title and would instead have to earn one, Rhodes became the first to declare himself for the men's Royal Rumble match.

At Saturday Night's Main Event XLII on December 13, 2025, Gunther defeated John Cena in the latter's retirement match by making Cena tap out. Over the following episodes of Raw, Gunther continuously gloated about making Cena tap out. Several wrestlers took issue with this, including AJ Styles, who confronted Gunther several times. During the Raw on Netflix Anniversary Show on January 5, 2026, Styles interrupted Gunther; however, Gunther did not allow Styles to speak, resulting in Styles slapping Gunther. They faced each other on the next episode where during the match, Gunther feigned a tap out during a Calf Crusher by Styles out of sight of the referee. Styles released the hold thinking he had won and during the distraction, Gunther delivered a low blow and a Powerbomb on Styles to win the match. The following week, Styles interrupted Gunther and challenged him to a rematch at the Royal Rumble. Gunther initially declined but later proposed that he would accept if Styles put his career on the line, as during the Crown Jewel: Perth Kickoff show in October 2025, Styles stated that he would retire in 2026. Later that night after consulting his wife, Styles accepted, with Raw General Manager Adam Pearce making the match official.

== Event ==
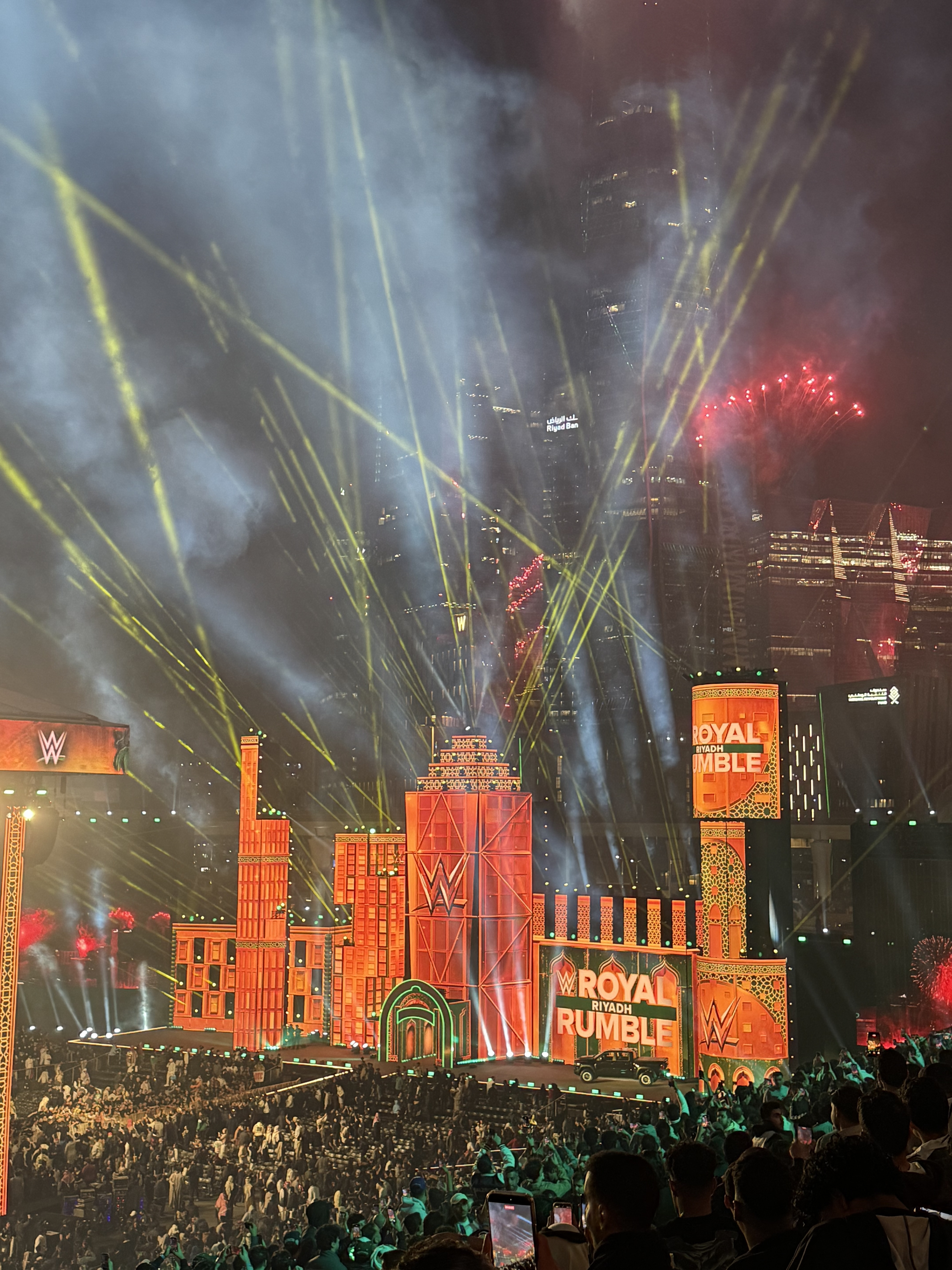
Royal Rumble stage

Stage following opening pyro

Other on-screen personnel
Role:	Name:
English commentators	Michael Cole
English commentators	Wade Barrett
Arabic commentators	Faisal Bin Mughaisib
Arabic commentators	Jude Aldajani
Ring announcer	Mark Nash
Referees	Danilo Anfibio
Referees	Jessika Carr
Referees	Dan Engler
Referees	Eddie Orengo
Referees	Charles Robinson
Referees	Ryan Tran
Interviewers	Cathy Kelley
Interviewers	Byron Saxton
Pre-show panel	Michael Cole
Pre-show panel	Jackie Redmond
Pre-show panel	Wade Barrett
Pre-show panel	Big E
Pre-show panel	CM Punk

=== Preliminary matches ===
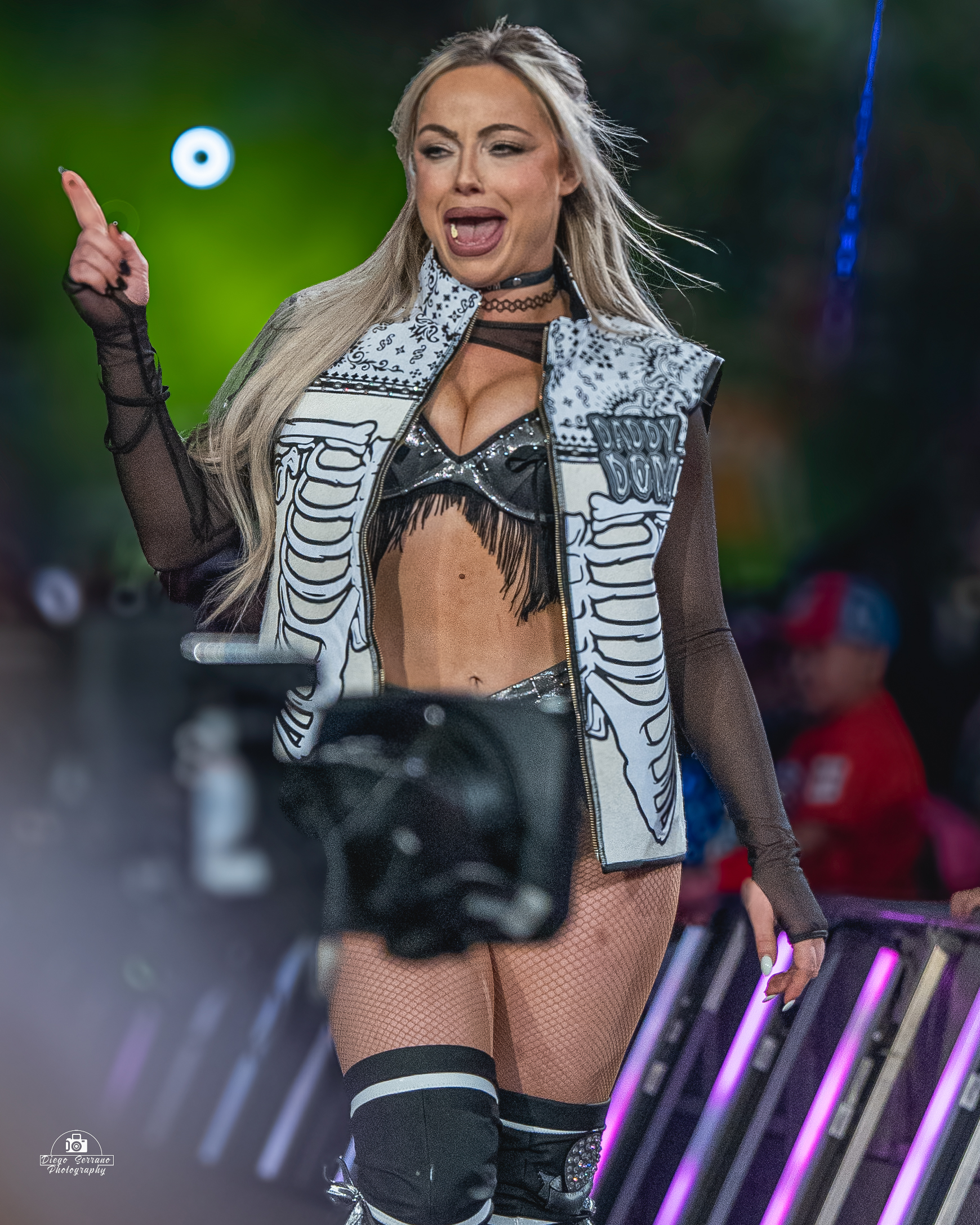
Liv Morgan, the winner of the 2026 Women's Royal Rumble match.

The PLE began with the women's Royal Rumble match. Charlotte Flair and Alexa Bliss began the match as the first and second entrants, respectively, and rather than fight each other, decided to wait for Kiana James, who entered third. Nia Jax entered fourth and dominated all three. Lola Vice entered sixth but was taken out before long by Jax. James performed a Samoan Drop on Jax and the remaining competitors tried to eliminate Jax. Candice LeRae entered seventh and formed a brief alliance with Jax, her former tag team partner. Jordynne Grace entered eighth and eliminated LeRae, Vice, and Ivy Nile (who entered fifth). Flair and Bliss attempted to eliminate Jax; Flair knocked Jax off the ring apron, inadvertently eliminating Bliss. Becky Lynch entered ninth, immediately reigniting an historic rivalry with Flair. Both rolled out of the ring and brawled at ringside. Nattie entered 13th and was targeted by Maxxine Dupri who entered 12th. When Lynch eliminated Dupri, Nattie eliminated Lynch.

Liv Morgan entered 14th. Lash Legend entered 15th and eliminated Grace after a struggle on the ring apron. Raquel Rodriguez entered 17th and aligned with her Judgment Day stablemates, Morgan and Roxanne Perez (who entered 11th), to eliminate Kiana James. Chelsea Green entered 18th, accompanied by Alba Fyre (who was not in the match), and targeted Morgan, Perez, and Rodriguez. Fyre intervened to help Green and Rodriguez clotheslined Fyre, putting her out of the ring. Giulia (19th), Iyo Sky (20th), and Asuka (21st) followed, leading to a confrontation between the three. Rhea Ripley entered 22nd, and quickly eliminated Green and Perez. Bayley (23rd) and Jacy Jayne (24th) targeted Sol Ruca, who was the 10th entrant. Nikki Bella entered 25th. Lyra Valkyria entered 26th and worked with her tag team partner, Bayley, to eliminate Giulia. A miscommunication between Kairi Sane (28th) and Asuka led to Sane eliminating Asuka, after which Sky immediately eliminated Sane. A returning Brie Bella, entering 29th, reunited with her sister, Nikki Bella, to eliminate Bayley and Valkyria. Tiffany Stratton was the final entrant. When Lash Legend eliminated both Bellas, eight competitors remained in the ring.

After eliminating Charlotte Flair and then Iyo Sky, Legend was herself immediately dispatched by Rhea Ripley, who in turn fell to Raquel Rodriguez. Rodriguez was then eliminated by her stablemate, Liv Morgan, leaving only Morgan, Ruca, and Stratton in the match. In the closing moments, Stratton, Ruca, and Morgan were on the ring apron. Stratton then eliminated Ruca, and Morgan eliminated Stratton to win the match and earn a women's championship match at WrestleMania 42.

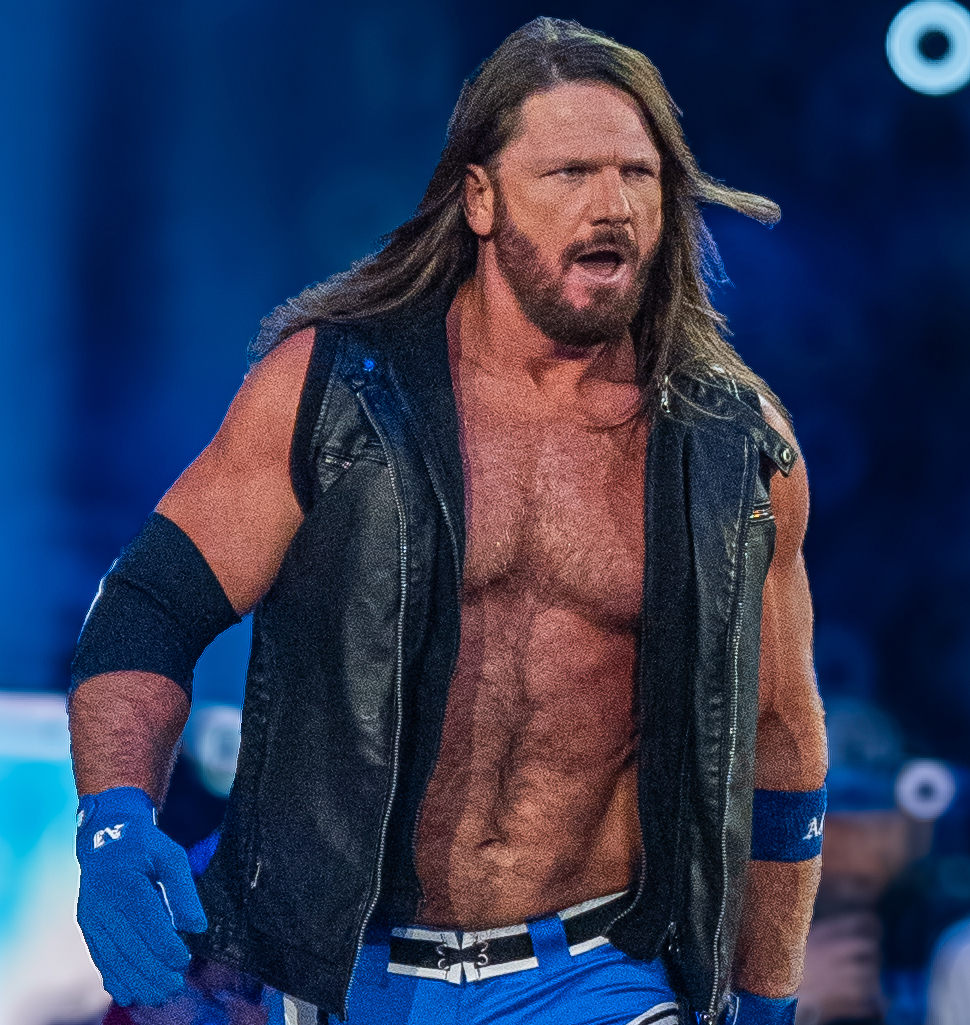
As a result of losing to Gunther, AJ Styles (pictured) was forced to retire from professional wrestling.

Next, AJ Styles faced Gunther in a Career Threatening match, where Styles would be forced to retire if he lost. Gunther dominated early with a suplex to Styles onto the announce table and a Boston Crab. Styles responded with an Ushigoroshi and locked in the Calf Crusher. Styles attempted a pinfall after a springboard 450 splash and the Styles Clash on Gunther for a nearfall. Amid a referee distraction, Gunther performed the low blow, a powerbomb, and brutally attacked Styles with chops and kicks that prompted the referee to check on Styles' condition. After Styles failed to connect with a Phenomenal Forearm, in the end, Gunther applied the sleeper hold on Styles who lost consciousness, leading the referee to award the technical submission victory to Gunther. Following the match, a visibly emotional Styles received a standing ovation from the crowd. Styles then removed his gloves, however, he chose to keep his gloves on and posed for the crowd.

In the penultimate match, Drew McIntyre defended the Undisputed WWE Championship against Sami Zayn. During the match, McIntyre focused on Zayn's lower back early in the match, and performed a backbreaker and an avalanche White Noise in Zayn for a near-fall. Zayn countered a superplex into a sunset flip powerbomb and performed the Blue Thunder Bomb on McIntyre for a nearfall. McIntyre performed three consecutive Future Shock DDTs on Zayn for a nearfall. McIntyre performed the Claymore on Zayn who placed his foot on the bottom rope to void the pin. Zayn performed a Helluva Kick on McIntyre for a nearfall. At ringside, McIntyre performed a powerbomb on Zayn through the announce table. After the referee and medical personnel checked on Zayn, McIntyre threw Zayn back into the ring, and taunted McIntyre. As Zayn attempted a Helluva Kick on McIntyre, McIntyre performed a Claymore on Zayn. In the end, McIntyre performed another Claymore on Zayn to retain the title.

=== Main event ===
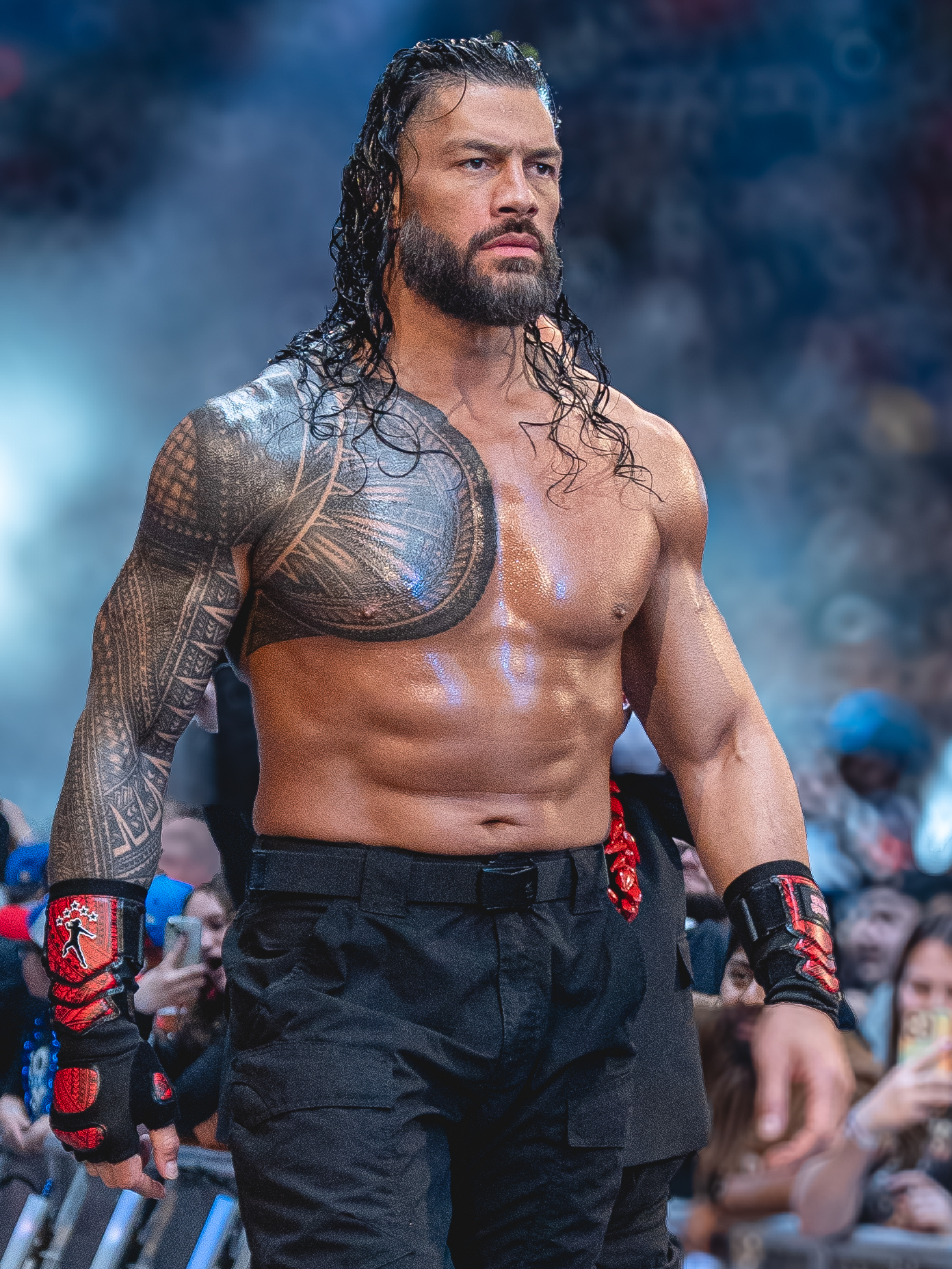
Roman Reigns, winner of the 2026 Men's Royal Rumble match, marking his second win, after 2015, which made him the 12th overall multi-time winner.

The main event was the men's Royal Rumble match which began with Oba Femi and Bron Breakker (the latter accompanied by Paul Heyman) as the first and second entrants. Before Breakker could enter the ring, a masked assailant, purportedly Seth Rollins, attacked Breakker. The masked assailant threw Breakker in the ring and escaped into the crowd, and Femi eliminated Breakker. Femi dominated the early stages, eliminating Solo Sikoa (who entered at #3), Rey Mysterio (who entered at #4) and Rusev (who entered at #5), and Matt Cardona (who entered at #6). Trick Williams entered 10th and eliminated Mr. Iguana (who entered #8) from sister promotion Lucha Libre AAA Worldwide (AAA), which WWE acquired in 2025, and had a staredown with Femi and Je'Von Evans (who entered at #9). A conflict between two versions of El Grande Americano (who entered #12) occurred (one portrayed by Ludwig Kaiser and the other by the returning Chad Gable who portrayed The Original El Grande Americano), resulting in Kaiser's elimination by Gable; Gable was then eliminated by Williams and Cody Rhodes (who entered at #11) eliminated Williams. Royce Keys, formerly Powerhouse Hobbs in All Elite Wrestling, made his WWE debut and entered #14 and eliminated Damian Priest (who entered at #7). The Vision's Austin Theory and Bronson Reed entered at #15 and #16 respectively. Fellow Vision member, Logan Paul, entered #20 to eliminate Keys, AAA's La Parka (who entered at #18), and Dragon Lee (who entered at #19).

LA Knight returned at number 21 and ended The Vision's domination of the match by eliminating Austin Theory and Bronson Reed. Brock Lesnar entered 22nd and eliminated Ilja Dragunov, Rey Fénix, and Femi. Cody Rhodes and LA Knight teamed up to eliminate Lesnar as Jey Uso came in. When Roman Reigns entered 26th, he turned on his cousin (Uso) and eliminated The Miz. Jacob Fatu arrived 27th and attacked Rhodes. Penta and Randy Orton were the next two in the ring, and the final entrant, Gunther, eliminated Penta. Orton eliminated Je'Von Evans after countering a cutter with the RKO. Miscommunication between Orton and Rhodes allowed Drew McIntyre, who was not a participant, to hit Rhodes with the Claymore on the ring apron, eliminating him.

Reigns eliminated Fatu and Uso, leaving Reigns, Gunther, Orton, and Paul the final four. Reigns eliminated Paul; Gunther eliminated Orton. Gunther attempted to lock in a sleeper hold, but Reigns countered by driving him into the turnbuckle. Reigns followed with a spear and then eliminated Gunther, securing a world championship match at WrestleMania 42. Aside from the only three-time winner, "Stone Cold" Steve Austin, Reigns became the 11th man, and 12th overall wrestler (including women), to win twice.

== Aftermath ==
This would be the final Royal Rumble to livestream on the WWE Network in any country as the service permanently shut down on April 1 in the last four remaining countries that still had the service, with these countries subsequently transitioning to Netflix. This would also be the final Royal Rumble to air on Abema in Japan before moving to Netflix on October 1.

=== Raw ===
On the following episode of Raw, an enraged Bron Breakker came out and destroyed the ringside area, furious over his sudden elimination at the start of the men's Royal Rumble match. Breakker's Vision members (Bronson Reed, Austin Theory, Logan Paul, and Paul Heyman) then came down to console Breakker while Breakker demanded for Raw General Manager Adam Pearce to come out to reveal the identity of the masked assailant that attacked Breakker. LA Knight then attacked The Vision before departing. The mysterious masked man would continue to attack the members of The Vision over the following weeks, before finally revealing his identity at Elimination Chamber to be a returning Seth Rollins, The Vision's former leader who had been turned on and excommunicated by the stable.

Also on Raw, SmackDown's Roman Reigns appeared and discussed his history in Philadelphia, Pennsylvania, and then considered which title he would challenge for at WrestleMania 42. Raw's World Heavyweight Champion CM Punk interrupted, and stated that Reigns could choose the easy path with Undisputed WWE Champion Drew McIntyre or the hard one with Punk. Following a heated exchange of words, Reigns expressed his hatred towards Punk and chose to challenge him for the World Heavyweight Championship at WrestleMania. This subsequently confirmed that the men's Elimination Chamber match winner would challenge for SmackDown's Undisputed WWE Championship at WrestleMania.

On the February 23 episode of Raw, AJ Styles made an appearance in Atlanta, Georgia, near his home town, to give a farewell address to the fans, before leaving his trademark gloves and jacket in the ring, officially concluding his 28-year long career. Styles was then met by The Undertaker who announced that he would be inducted in the WWE Hall of Fame Class of 2026.

Also on February 23, after weeks of delaying her choice, Liv Morgan decided that she would challenge Stephanie Vaquer for her own brand's Women's World Championship at WrestleMania 42. This subsequently confirmed that the women's Elimination Chamber match winner would challenge for SmackDown's WWE Women's Championship at WrestleMania.

=== SmackDown ===
On the following episode of SmackDown, as Undisputed WWE Champion Drew McIntyre was heading to the ring, he was attacked by Cody Rhodes in an act of revenge from the Royal Rumble. Rhodes then cut a promo about his frustrations with McIntyre before concluding that McIntyre would not make it to WrestleMania. SmackDown General Manager Nick Aldis later added Rhodes to an Elimination Chamber qualifying match for the next episode, which should he win would add him to the men's Elimination Chamber match, but on the condition that Rhodes left the building so as to not cause any more issues and Rhodes reluctantly agreed. Jacob Fatu, who had also been feuding with both Rhodes and McIntyre and was the one who accidentally caused Rhodes to lose the championship to McIntyre, was also added to a qualifying match under the same condition as Rhodes.

== Results ==
No.	Results	Stipulations	Times
1^{D}	The Wyatt Sicks (Dexter Lumis and Joe Gacy) defeated The MFTs (Solo Sikoa and Tama Tonga)	Tag team match	10:27
2^{D}	Motor City Machine Guns (Alex Shelley and Chris Sabin) and Shinsuke Nakamura defeated The New Day (Kofi Kingston and Xavier Woods) and Grayson Waller	Six-man tag team match	11:15
3	Liv Morgan won by last eliminating Tiffany Stratton	30-woman Royal Rumble match for a world championship match at WrestleMania 42	1:07:00
4	Gunther defeated AJ Styles by technical submission	Career Threatening match Since Styles lost, he was forced to retire from in-ring competition.	24:15
5	Drew McIntyre (c) defeated Sami Zayn by pinfall	Singles match for the Undisputed WWE Championship	16:15
6	Roman Reigns won by last eliminating Gunther	30-man Royal Rumble match for a world championship match at WrestleMania 42	56:10
(c) / – the champion(s) heading into the match; D / – this was a dark match

=== Women's Royal Rumble match entrances and eliminations ===
– Raw
– SmackDown
– NXT
– Hall of Famer (HOF)
– Winner

Draw	Entrant	Brand/Status	Order	Eliminated by	Time	Elimination(s)
1	Charlotte Flair	SmackDown	23	Lash Legend	59:49	2
2	Alexa Bliss	SmackDown	5	Charlotte Flair	13:29	0
3	Kiana James	SmackDown	9	Raquel Rodriguez	27:30	0
4	Nia Jax	SmackDown	4	Charlotte Flair	09:29	0
5	Ivy Nile	Raw	3	Jordynne Grace	06:24	0
6	Lola Vice	NXT	1	Jordynne Grace	04:32	0
7	Candice LeRae	SmackDown	2	Jordynne Grace	02:13	0
8	Jordynne Grace	SmackDown	8	Lash Legend	14:47	3
9	Becky Lynch	Raw	7	Nattie	07:35	1
10	Sol Ruca	NXT	28	Tiffany Stratton	50:47	1
11	Roxanne Perez	Raw	12	Rhea Ripley	22:12	0
12	Maxxine Dupri	Raw	6	Becky Lynch	02:47	0
13	Nattie	Raw	13	Liv Morgan	23:01	1
14	Liv Morgan	Raw	—	Winner	43:50	3
15	Lash Legend	SmackDown	25	Rhea Ripley	38:46	5
16	Zelina	SmackDown	10	Giulia	10:54	0
17	Raquel Rodriguez	Raw	27	Liv Morgan	35:29	2
18	Chelsea Green	SmackDown	11	Rhea Ripley	08:35	0
19	Giulia	SmackDown	14	Lyra Valkyria	15:15	1
20	Iyo Sky	Raw	24	Lash Legend	27:31	1
21	Asuka	Raw	15	Kairi Sane	14:36	0
22	Rhea Ripley	Raw	26	Raquel Rodriguez	25:40	3
23	Bayley	Raw	18	Nikki Bella	16:22	0
24	Jacy Jayne	NXT	20	Sol Ruca	16:11	1
25	Nikki Bella	Raw (HOF)	21	Lash Legend	14:02	1
26	Lyra Valkyria	Raw	17	Brie Bella	10:44	1
27	Kelani Jordan	NXT	19	Jacy Jayne	09:22	0
28	Kairi Sane	Raw	16	Iyo Sky	01:36	1
29	Brie Bella	HOF	22	Lash Legend	06:50	1
30	Tiffany Stratton	SmackDown	29	Liv Morgan	12:48	1

=== Men's Royal Rumble match entrances and eliminations ===
– Raw
– SmackDown
– AAA
– Unaffiliated
– Hall of Famer (HOF)
– Winner

Draw	Entrant	Brand/Status	Order	Eliminated by	Time	Elimination(s)
1	Oba Femi	Unaffiliated	18	Brock Lesnar	39:04	5
2	Bron Breakker	Raw	1	Oba Femi	00:10	0
3	Solo Sikoa	SmackDown	3	Oba Femi	03:51	0
4	Rey Mysterio	Raw (HOF)	4	Oba Femi	02:43	0
5	Rusev	Raw	2	Oba Femi	00:32	0
6	Matt Cardona	SmackDown	5	Oba Femi	00:55	0
7	Damian Priest	SmackDown	10	Royce Keys	11:06	0
8	Je'Von Evans	Raw	22	Randy Orton	40:58	0
9	Mr. Iguana	AAA	6	Trick Williams	02:05	0
10	Trick Williams	SmackDown	9	Cody Rhodes	06:19	2
11	Cody Rhodes	SmackDown	24	Drew McIntyre (Note: Drew McIntyre was not an official participant in the match.)	36:50	3
12	El Grande Americano	Raw	7	"The Original" El Grande Americano	02:45	0
13	"The Original" El Grande Americano	Raw	8	Trick Williams	01:21	1
14	Royce Keys	Unaffiliated	11	Bronson Reed	09:55	1
15	Austin Theory	Raw	14	LA Knight	10:08	1
16	Bronson Reed	Raw	15	LA Knight	09:02	2
17	Ilja Dragunov	SmackDown	16	Brock Lesnar	11:00	0
18	La Parka	AAA	12	Austin Theory	04:26	0
19	Dragon Lee	Raw	13	Bronson Reed	03:01	0
20	Logan Paul	Raw	27	Roman Reigns	25:07	0
21	LA Knight	Raw	21	Cody Rhodes	14:25	3
22	Brock Lesnar	Unaffiliated	19	Cody Rhodes and LA Knight	05:32	3
23	The Miz	SmackDown	20	Roman Reigns	07:05	0
24	Rey Fenix	SmackDown	17	Brock Lesnar	00:28	0
25	Jey Uso	Raw	26	Roman Reigns	13:08	0
26	Roman Reigns	SmackDown	—	Winner	15:48	5
27	Jacob Fatu	SmackDown	25	Roman Reigns	09:01	0
28	Penta	Raw	23	Gunther	06:01	0
29	Randy Orton	SmackDown	28	Gunther	07:40	1
30	Gunther	Raw	29	Roman Reigns	07:51	2

=== WWE Championship No. 1 Contender's Tournament ===
Qualifiers; SmackDown; January 16, 2026
Randy Orton	Pinfall
The Miz	4:30
Matt Cardona	8:50
Trick Williams	Pinfall
Damian Priest	Pinfall
Solo Sikoa	9:45
Sami Zayn	Pinfall
Ilja Dragunov	12:30

Final; Saturday Night's Main Event; January 24, 2026
Randy Orton	—
Trick Williams	—
Damian Priest	17:00
Sami Zayn	Pinfall

== See also ==
- List of WWE pay-per-view and livestreaming supercards
- Sport in Saudi Arabia
- WWE in Saudi Arabia
