= WWE: Uncaged series =

Index of articles associated with the same name

WWE: Uncaged is the name of a series of albums featuring unreleased theme songs mostly written and performed by Jim Johnston. The first album was released on December 16, 2016, and so far there have been fifteen albums released in total as of February 8, 2021. Starting from WWE: Uncaged XI, the albums were released around the 'Big Four' pay-per-view events (Royal Rumble, WrestleMania, SummerSlam, and Survivor Series). However, there have been no new releases since February 2021, leaving the future of the series in doubt.

Album	Date released	Number of songs	Length
WWE: Uncaged	December 16, 2016	16	49:41
WWE: Uncaged II	March 21, 2017	16	48:15
WWE: Uncaged III	August 21, 2017	16	53:00
WWE: Uncaged IV	November 20, 2017	12	32:56
WWE: Uncaged V	August 20, 2018	14	43:02
WWE: Uncaged VI	October 26, 2018	14	41:20
WWE: Uncaged VII	January 25, 2019	13	39:36
WWE: Uncaged VIII	May 17, 2019	13	40:22
WWE: Uncaged IX	August 9, 2019	21	44:56
WWE: Uncaged X	October 4, 2019	25	1:00:23
WWE: Uncaged XI	January 31, 2020	12	33:42
WWE: Uncaged XII	April 4, 2020	14	42:07
WWE: Uncaged XIII	August 21, 2020	15	45:37
WWE: Uncaged XIV	November 20, 2020	53	2:38:33
WWE: Uncaged XV	February 8, 2021	25	1:07:28
