= Uncaged (disambiguation) =

Uncaged is a 2012 album by Zac Brown Band.

Uncaged may also refer to:

- Uncaged, a series of compilation albums from the record label Monstercat
- WWE: Uncaged series, a series of compilation music albums from WWE
- Uncaged Campaigns, a British non-profit animal protection organization
- Uncaged Films, a film studio
- Uncaged: Faces of Sigil, an accessory for 2nd edition Advanced Dungeons & Dragons
- Uncaged (anthology), an adventure anthology series for 5th edition Dungeons & Dragons
