= WWE: Uncaged III =

Compilation album by World Wrestling Entertainment
- Released: August 21, 2017
- Length: 53:00
- Label: WWE Music Group
- Producer: Jim Johnston

World Wrestling Entertainment chronology
WWE: Uncaged II (2017)	WWE: Uncaged III (2017)	WWE: Uncaged IV (2017)

WWE: Uncaged III is a compilation album of previously unreleased professional wrestling entrance theme songs which was released by WWE on August 21, 2017 on online music stores.

== Track listing ==
All songs are composed, written and produced by Jim Johnston

Track	Song	Subject	Length
1	"Medal (Remix)"	Kurt Angle	3:02
2	"Smoke and Mirrors (Ugly)"	Cody Rhodes	3:25
3	"Deviant"	Goldust	3:50
4	"Venom”	Stone Cold Steve Austin	3:01
5	"Crackin"	Eddie Guerrero	3:03
6	"Evil Behind the Makeup"	Doink the Clown	3:29
7	"Model”	Rick "The Model" Martel	3:37
8	"Follower"	Ministry of Darkness	2:55
9	"I Want it All"	SmackDown	3:12
10	"My Time (Instrumental)"	Triple H	3:16
11	"Enough is Enough (Nation)"	Owen Hart	3:49
12	"Urban Cowboy"	Jeff Jarrett	2:59
13	"Dojo"	Kaientai	1:54
14	"Gut Punch"	Viscera	3:11
15	"Animal"	Batista	2:56
16	"Is Cooking"	The Rock	5:21

== See also ==
- Music in professional wrestling
