= WWE: Uncaged =

Compilation album by World Wrestling Entertainment
- Released: December 16, 2016
- Length: 49:41
- Label: WWE Music Group
- Producer: Jim Johnston

World Wrestling Entertainment chronology
WWE: Uncaged (2016)	WWE: Uncaged II (2017)

WWE: Uncaged is a compilation album of professional wrestling entrance theme songs that was released by WWE on December 16, 2016, on online music stores. The album includes several tracks that were previously unreleased to the public, with tracks 15 and 16 featuring acoustic versions of Randy Orton's and Batista's theme songs.

== Track listing ==
All songs are composed, written and produced by Jim Johnston.

Track	Song	Subject	Length
1	"Smack"	SmackDown	3:12
2	"Holla If Ya Hear Me"	Scott Steiner	3:16
3	"Break the Walls Down"	Chris Jericho	2:40
4	"Viva La Raza"	Eddie Guerrero	3:31
5	"Desert Threat"	The Iron Sheik	2:50
6	"Dragon"	Ricky Steamboat	3:06
7	"Blayzing Hot"	Alundra Blayze	2:43
8	"The Horror"	The Boogeyman	3:24
9	"Buffalo"	Tatanka	3:06
10	"Posse"	Mean Street Posse	2:54
11	"Star of Vega"	Savio Vega	3:08
12	"Hardwood"	Bam Bam Bigelow	2:57
13	"Green Mist"	Tajiri	3:16
14	"Fighter"	Dan Severn	2:28
15	"I Walk Alone (Acoustic)"	Batista	3:31
16	"Voices (Acoustic)"	Randy Orton	3:39

== See also ==
- Music in professional wrestling
