= Mark Nash (announcer) =

Professional wrestling ring announcer

Personal information
- Born: Mark Shunock; April 2, 1977 (age 49) Sault Ste. Marie, Ontario, Canada

Professional wrestling career
- Ring name: Mark Nash
- Debut: March 28, 2025

Mark Shunock (born April 2, 1977), better known as Mark Nash is a Canadian ring announcer. He is signed to WWE, where he serves as the ring announcer for SmackDown.

== Career ==
Shunock was the announcer for Top Rank Boxing on ESPN for seven years, and also worked with the National Hockey League (NHL) franchise, the Vegas Golden Knights, and with the NFLs Las Vegas Raiders.

On March 27, 2025, Shunock announced on social media that he had signed to WWE. He made his debut the following night, during the March 28, 2025 episode of SmackDown, under the name Mark Nash.
