= WWE: Uncaged II =

Compilation album by World Wrestling Entertainment
- Released: March 21, 2017
- Length: 48:15
- Label: WWE Music Group
- Producer: Jim Johnston

World Wrestling Entertainment chronology
WWE: Uncaged (2016)	WWE: Uncaged II (2017)	WWE: Uncaged III (2017)

WWE: Uncaged II is a compilation album of unreleased professional wrestling entrance theme songs which was released by WWE on March 21, 2017, on online music stores. The album was originally scheduled to be released on March 17, 2017, but was delayed. The album features multiple tracks that were not available to the general public before the release of the album, track 10 "Danger in the Jungle" with Rainforest intro was originally used for The Headshrinkers, the version that Haku and Faces of Fear used was remixed with drums in WCW, Track 6 Shango Tango/Forest Voodoo an arena version was used for Paul Bearer & The Executioner in 1996

== Track listing ==
All songs are composed, written and produced by Jim Johnston,

Track	Song	Subject	Length
1	"Dam-Nation"	Rob Van Dam	2:42
2	"Guard"	Big Boss Man	3:12
3	"Lie Cheat Steal"	Eddie Guerrero	3:02
4	"Trust Me"	Jake "The Snake" Roberts	3:13
5	"Bangers"	The Headbangers	3:05
6	"Shango Tango"	Papa Shango	3:45
7	"Ticking Timebomb"	Brian Pillman	2:49
8	"Snow-Man"	Al Snow	3:13
9	"Pretty Mean Sister"	Jacqueline	3:00
10	"Danger in the Jungle"	Haku	3:06
11	"Radicalz"	The Radicalz	3:24
12	"Storm"	Texas Tornado	2:10
13	"Dragon"	Último Dragón	3:24
14	"Bam Bam"	Bam Bam Bigelow	3:06
15	"Desert Soldier"	Colonel Mustafa with General Adnan	1:46
16	"And Then There Was Darkness" feat Shaman's Harvest	WrestleMania 31	3:18

== See also ==
- Music in professional wrestling
