= WWE: Uncaged IV =

Compilation album by World Wrestling Entertainment
- Released: November 20, 2017
- Length: 32:56
- Label: WWE Music Group
- Producer: Jim Johnston

World Wrestling Entertainment chronology
WWE: Uncaged III (2017)	WWE: Uncaged IV (2017)	WWE: Uncaged V (2018)

WWE: Uncaged IV is a compilation album of unreleased professional wrestling entrance theme songs which was released by WWE on November 20, 2017 on online music stores. The album features multiple tracks that were not available to the general public before the release of the album.

== Track listing ==
All songs are composed, written and produced by Jim Johnston.

Track	Song	Subject	Length
1	"Enforcer"	Brock Lesnar	3:13
2	"Circle of Doom"	The Ringmaster	3:51
3	"Corporate Player"	Triple H	2:55
4	"Are You Ready? (2000)"	D-Generation X	2:55
5	"Made in the USA"	Lex Luger	3:13
6	"Dangerous River"	Essa Rios	2:47
7	"Jackknife"	Kevin Nash	2:56
8	"Pierced"	Droz	2:24
9	"Masterpiece"	Chris Masters	2:58
10	"Iceman"	Dean Malenko	2:45
11	"Wreck (Acoustic)"	Holy Foley!	0:44
12	"Is Christmas Ready?"	D-Generation X	2:15

== See also ==
- Music in professional wrestling
