= WWE SmackDown =

Professional wrestling television program

- Logo used since September 13, 2024
- Also known as: SmackDown! (1999–2008); SmackDown Live (2016–2019)
- Genre: Professional wrestling
- Created by: Vince McMahon
- Written by: John Swikata (lead writer); Ryan Ward (lead writer); See list of SmackDown creative writers
- Presented by: Michael Cole (play-by-play commentator); Joe Tessitore (alternate play–by–play commentator); Corey Graves (color commentator); Wade Barrett (alternate color commentator)
- Starring: SmackDown roster
- Announcer: Mark Nash
- Opening theme: "Let 'Em Know" by T.I.
- Country of origin: United States
- No. of seasons: 28
- No. of episodes: 1422

Production
- Executive producers: Paul "Triple H" Levesque (2024–present); Lee Fitting (2024–present)
- Camera setup: Multi-camera setup
- Running time: 120 minutes (August 26, 1999–present) (Note: For the duration of the SmackDown contract with USA Network since 2024, the show runs in a two-hour format between July to December.) (including commercials); 180 minutes (January 3, 2025–present) (Note: From January to June, SmackDown runs in a three-hour format for the duration of the contract with USA Network until 2029.) (including commercials)
- Production company: World Wrestling Entertainment, LLC

Original release
- Network: UPN
- Release: August 26, 1999 – September 15, 2006
- Network: The CW
- Release: September 22, 2006 – September 26, 2008
- Network: MyNetworkTV
- Release: October 3, 2008 – September 24, 2010
- Network: Syfy
- Release: October 1, 2010 – December 31, 2015
- Network: USA Network
- Release: January 7, 2016 – September 24, 2019
- Network: Fox
- Release: October 4, 2019 – September 6, 2024
- Network: USA Network (Note: Due to USA Network's coverage of the 2026 Winter Olympics, the series temporarily aired on sister channel Syfy for two weeks.)
- Release: September 13, 2024 – present

Related
- WWE Raw; WWE Evolve; WWE NXT

WWE SmackDown, also known as Friday Night SmackDown or simply SmackDown, is an American professional wrestling television program produced by WWE. It currently airs live every Friday at 8 p.m. Eastern Time (ET) on USA Network in the United States, and in most international markets on Netflix. The show features characters from the SmackDown brand, to which WWE wrestlers are assigned to work and perform. SmackDown debuted on August 26, 1999, and is considered to be one of WWE's two flagship programs, along with Monday Night Raw.

Originally launched as a complementary second show to Raw, SmackDown became further distinct after the WWE brand split in 2002, representing the company's talent in the SmackDown brand roster. It has been taped in and broadcast from over hundreds of arenas and cities throughout twelve countries, mostly in the United States but also in Canada, France, Germany, Iraq, Italy, Japan, (Note: In 2005) Mexico, (Note: (In 2011 and 2026)) Saudi Arabia, Spain, (Note: (In 2025)) the United Kingdom, Ireland (Note: (In 2025)) and Australia. (Note: (In 2025)) Prior to switching to its current live format, taped episodes premiered a few hours or up to a day earlier in certain countries outside the United States due to time differences.

SmackDown! began on the broadcast network UPN in 1999 and was initially broadcast on Thursday nights. The show moved to Friday nights on September 9, 2005, and began airing on The CW in September 2006, after the merger of UPN and the WB, before later moving to MyNetworkTV in October 2008. On October 1, 2010, SmackDown moved to cable network Syfy, and eventually returned to Thursdays on January 15, 2015. The show then moved to the sibling USA Network on January 7, 2016, and later that year, beginning on July 19, SmackDown began broadcasting live on Tuesday nights. SmackDown's move to Fox on October 4, 2019 marked the show's return to Friday nights and over-the-air broadcast television. On September 13, 2024, the show returned to USA Network. As of 2024, SmackDown is the most viewed television show on Friday nights in the United States. SmackDown! has also been broadcast globally on other networks since it first began. The WWE Network ceased operations in the United States on April 4, 2021, with all content moved to Peacock which has all previous episodes of SmackDown, in 2025 most WWE content was moved to Netflix. As of March 15, 2026, Peacock retains replays of recent episodes of WWE SmackDown until at least 2029, as USA Network secured a five-year broadcasting rights deal for the program that began in 2024.

== History ==
=== Early years (1999–2002) ===
The first ever SmackDown! logo used from August 26, 1999, to August 9, 2001

WWF SmackDown! first appeared on April 29, 1999, using the Raw is War set as a single television special on UPN. On August 26, 1999, SmackDown! officially debuted on UPN as a weekly, two-hour, primetime show. As a second WWF show complementing Raw, SmackDown! increased the exposure to the company's superstars and the storylines and its airing on the UPN network expanded the accessibility of WWF television to audiences without a cable subscription. SmackDown! was also conceived to compete against World Championship Wrestling (WCW)'s Thursday night show, Thunder, and like Thunder it was recorded on Tuesdays and then broadcast on Thursdays.

SmackDown! quickly became UPN's most watched show and is credited for saving the network. The show had a viewership of about 6.5 million as of late 1999, almost as many as the WWF's flagship show Raw. The new WWF show was so popular that WCW moved Thunder to Wednesdays so that it would not compete directly. However, some advertisers pulled after citing what they thought was the show's overly crude nature on broadcast television, and combined with a Parents Television Council campaign led to bad publicity for WWF. On November 30, 1999, Vince McMahon announced changes that will lead to "less aggression, less colorful language, less sexuality" on Smackdown!.

Throughout the show's early existence, The Rock routinely called SmackDown! "his show", in reference to the fact that the name was derived from one of his catchphrases, "Layeth the Smack down".

=== Brand extension (2002–2009) ===
In March 2002, WWF implemented the "brand extension", under which Raw and SmackDown! would have separate rosters of performers that are exclusive to their respective programs and events, and be positioned in-universe as competing "brands" (in a manner reminiscent of athletic conferences).

In the 2004–05 season, SmackDown! had an average viewership of 5.1 million viewers, making it UPN's second-highest-rated series behind America's Next Top Model. With the cancellation of Star Trek: Enterprise, SmackDown! moved into its former timeslot on Friday nights for the 2005–06 season, beginning September 9, 2005. WWE subsequently announced that the show would be renamed Friday Night SmackDown! to emphasize the new scheduling.

In January 2006, CBS Corporation and Warner Bros. Entertainment announced that UPN and The WB would merge to form a new network known as The CW that fall. As part of the announcement, The CW announced that it would renew Friday Night SmackDown! for two more seasons as part of its launch schedule—which drew from the strongest programs of its two predecessors. On September 22, 2006, Friday Night SmackDown! aired its first ever episode on The CW.

The CW declined to renew SmackDown, resulting in the series being picked up in October 2008 by MyNetworkTV, a second new network that had been formed by Fox Entertainment Group to take on former UPN and WB affiliates who were not selected to join The CW. Retaining its previous Friday-night time slot, the season premiere of SmackDown on MyNetworkTV was the highest-rated program in that night on the network, with 3.2 million viewers. On March 20, 2009, SmackDown celebrated its 500th episode.

=== Move to Syfy and USA Network (2010–2019) ===
On October 1, 2010, as part of a new broadcast deal with NBC Universal, SmackDown moved to Syfy, retaining its Friday night timeslot. This move left MyNetworkTV with no new original programming other than the first-run programming that it shared with its syndicators.

Prior to this premiere of SmackDown, Michael Cole hosted a "pre-game" show. The move saw Syfy paying close to $30 million for the show as opposed to the $20 million paid by its former network MyNetworkTV.

During the August 29, 2011 episode of Raw, WWE dissolved the brand extension, thus allowing performers to appear on Raw and SmackDown at any given time without restriction. The October 14, 2011, episode made SmackDown the second-longest-running weekly episodic television series of American television history (behind Raw, which surpassed that mark on August 1, 2005). On January 18, 2013, SmackDown celebrated its 700th episode.

On October 10, 2014, SmackDown celebrated its 15-year anniversary. To help celebrate the 15th anniversary, Stephanie McMahon came out first, then Laurinaitis and Long, respectively, the latter of which kept one-upping each other for the main event of the night until McMahon decided to keep the 15-man tag team match that Long suggested, on the condition Laurinaitis and Long be the captains of each team like at WrestleMania XXVIII. Long's team won the match. On December 16, 2014, SmackDown aired a live 800th episode special on Syfy's sister channel USA Network, SuperSmackDown Live!, featuring a main event between Dolph Ziggler and Seth Rollins.

In January 2015, SmackDown returned to a Thursday time slot. The return to Thursday nights was expected to help attract a younger audience to Syfy, as well as more premium advertising dollars from marketers, who tend to spend more to promote their products, especially film releases, on the night as consumers head into the weekend. The last SmackDown airing on a Friday night had 2.43 million viewers with a 0.7 share. On January 7, 2016, SmackDown moved to USA Network, remaining on Thursday nights. With the move, all top three WWE programs—Raw, SmackDown and Tough Enough—would air on the same network for the first time ever.

On May 25, 2016, as part of the re-implementation of the brand extension and split between Raw and SmackDown, it was announced that SmackDown would move to Tuesday nights and be broadcast live. On the July 11, 2016 episode of Raw, Vince McMahon named Shane McMahon the commissioner of SmackDown. Then next week on Raw, Daniel Bryan was revealed as the new SmackDown General Manager. On July 22, 2016, general manager Daniel Bryan revealed the new SmackDown logo on his official Twitter page, renaming the show SmackDown Live. On April 10, 2018, SmackDown Commissioner Shane McMahon announced that Daniel Bryan was back as a full-time WWE wrestler and named Paige the new general manager. The show had its 1,000th episode on October 16, 2018.

=== SmackDown on Fox (2019–2024) ===
This SmackDown logo used from October 4, 2019 to September 6, 2024 during its run on Fox.

On June 26, 2018, Fox announced a five-year agreement to air SmackDown, in a deal worth $205 million per year. SmackDown would debut on October 4, 2019, with its first episode being the 20th Anniversary special. The episode also marked the return of SmackDown to Friday nights and the return of WWE programming to Fox for the first time since Fox aired the November 14, 1992 episode of Saturday Night's Main Event. The agreement came as WWE's previous broadcast deal with USA Network to air both SmackDown and WWE Raw was set to expire, and as Fox has increasingly emphasized live sports programming and non-scripted entertainment in the wake of its then-upcoming sale of its in-house studios to Disney. Fox had hoped to acquire Raw for the Fox network and SmackDown for FS1. However, amid a competitive bidding situation, NBCUniversal focused its efforts on renewing Raw, freeing up Fox to pursue SmackDown. In particular, Fox promised a larger amount of promotion for SmackDown during its sports programming, as well as a WWE-oriented studio show (WWE Backstage) on FS1.

From March 13, 2020, all WWE touring shows were cancelled indefinitely due to the COVID-19 pandemic, with SmackDown, Raw, and pay-per-views being broadcast from a studio in the WWE Performance Center in Orlando, Florida with no audience beginning that night. The ensuing episode also featured Triple H as a guest commentator, and an encore presentation of the Elimination Chamber match for the SmackDown Tag Team Championship from the titular pay-per-view the previous Sunday. On August 17, WWE announced that SmackDown, Raw, and pay-per-views would move out of the Performance Center to the "WWE ThunderDome" at Orlando's Amway Center, beginning with SmackDown on August 21. The program continued to be broadcast behind closed doors, but with a virtual audience and enhanced arena production. WWE returned to hosting and touring shows for both the SmackDown and Raw brands in July 2021.

Since the move to Fox, SmackDown has occasionally been pre-empted to FS1 due to conflicts with other Fox Sports programming airing in primetime, particularly the Major League Baseball postseason. In one instance in October 2019 due to the World Series, an hour-long version of the episode aired on Fox the following Sunday afternoon.

In conjunction with the 2023 Money in the Bank event, which was held at The O2 Arena in London, England, on July 1, the June 30, 2023, episode of SmackDown was held at the same venue, and broadcast live on BT Sport in local primetime hours for the first time. In 2024, the program aired episodes from other countries for the first time in conjunction with other WWE PPV's, including May 3 for Backlash France (LDLC Arena in Décines-Charpieu, Lyon, France), May 24 for King and Queen of the Ring (Jeddah Super Dome in Jeddah, Saudi Arabia), and August 31 for Bash in Berlin (Uber Arena in Berlin, Germany).

=== Return to USA Network and global move to Netflix (2024–present) ===
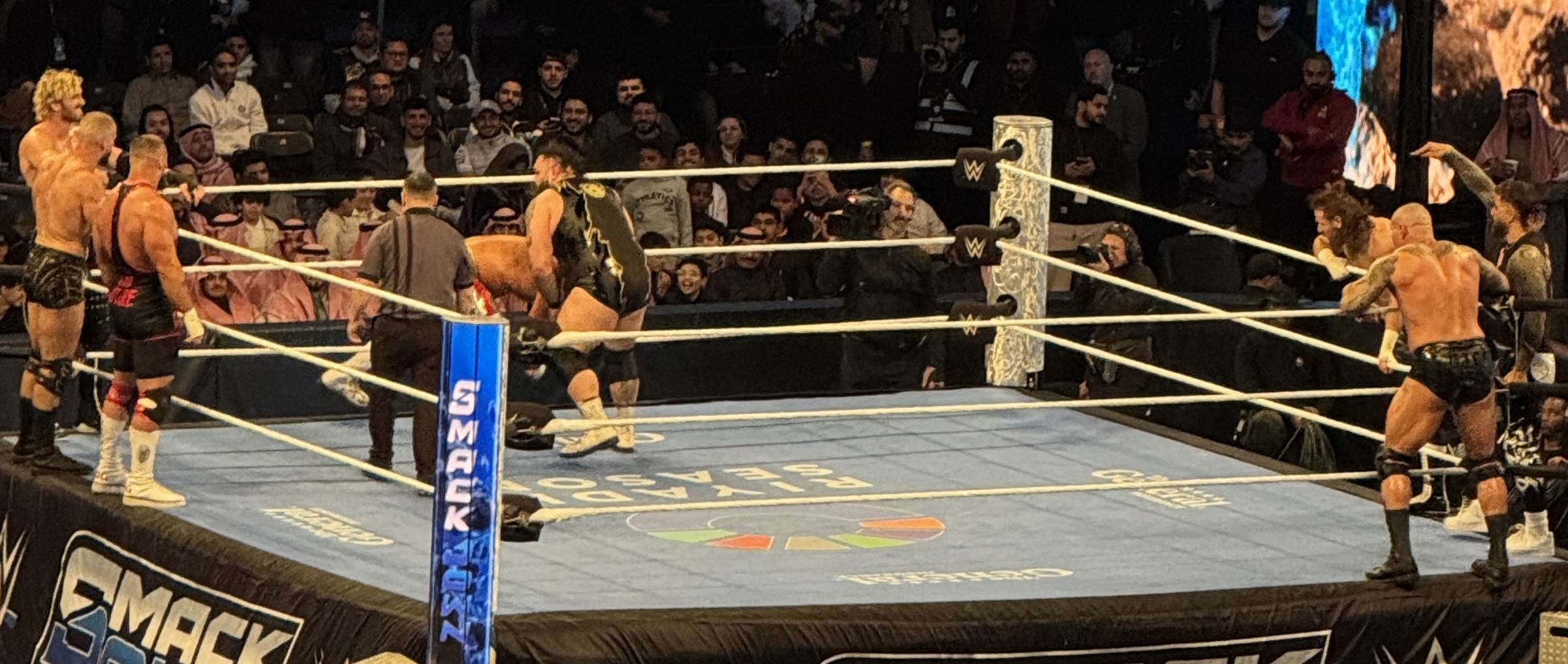
An 8 man tag team match in progress

On September 21, 2023, it was announced that SmackDown would return to USA Network in October 2024, following the expiration of WWE's contract with Fox. The agreement with NBCUniversal was reported to be valued at $1.4 billion over five years, an increase over the previous agreement. As part of the agreement, WWE also agreed to produce four primetime specials for sister broadcast network NBC per-year; these specials were later revealed to be a second revival of Saturday Night's Main Event, which premiered on December 14, 2024.

The original date of SmackDown's return to USA Network was October 4, 2024, the fifth anniversary of its premiere on Fox, however, Fox had originally planned to move the final three episodes of SmackDown to FS1 to accommodate the premiere of Fox College Football Friday in its former time slot. On May 9, 2024, USA Network announced that SmackDown would return to the channel on September 13, 2024, retaining its Friday-night timeslot.

On December 20, 2024, WWE announced that SmackDown would expand to three hours beginning January 3, 2025, replacing NXT Level Up. As Netflix acquired the rights to WWE programming outside of the United States, and Raw globally starting January 2025, that episode of SmackDown was streamed on YouTube internationally in the interim. SmackDown's formal Netflix debut was on the January 10 episode, following the debut of Raw on Netflix. On June 27, 2025, it was announced that SmackDown would be moving back to two hours on July 4. However, WWE then announced on December 13, 2025 that SmackDown would return to its three hour format on January 2, 2026 which will last until June as with the case of 2025; though that episode of SmackDown aired on USA Network under the ownership of Versant, a company that consists of the cable networks spun off from NBCUniversal. According to journalist Bryan Alvarez, he stated that the current three-hour block is expected to follow a similar pattern to 2025 with SmackDown could potentially revert to two hours in the second half of the year as the longer format seems to be part of a broader effort by USA Network to test strong lead-ins for other programming. He added that the second half of 2026 may introduce a new show targeting the wrestling audience similar to Everything on the Menu With Braun Strowman, that a lot of wrestling fans would watch, and that would follow SmackDown starting in the latter half of the year.

Episodes are aired outside of America on Netflix are aired as a live stream, except for taped (pre-recorded) episodes, which are edited for content following the live tapings, before being released as a VOD after the show finishes in the United States.

On January 19, 2026, SmackDown temporarily moved to Syfy in the United States for two weeks in February due to USA Network broadcasting coverage of the 2026 Winter Olympics.

== Production ==
From inception until summer 2005, WWE taped SmackDown on Tuesday evenings to air on Thursday evenings on UPN the same week. However, SmackDown had aired occasional live specials on Tuesday nights (which are then replayed in its usual Thursday night timeslot). From September 9, 2005 onwards (with the exception of 2015-2019), the show airs on Friday evenings. The show began broadcasting in HD beginning with the January 25, 2008, episode of SmackDown, where a new set (which became universal for all WWE weekly programming) debuted. Following the first broadcast in HD, the exclamation mark used since the show's inception disappeared from all references pertaining to "SmackDown", including the official logo, which resembles the 2001–2008 logo, but with a darker blue scheme.

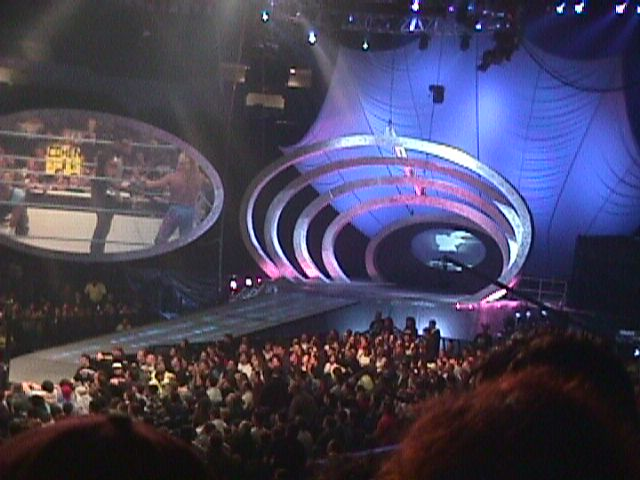
The set used from the show's debut on August 26, 1999, until August 16, 2001

The early set included an oval-shaped TitanTron entrance and stage (dubbed the "Ovaltron") which made it stand out from the Raw Is War set with its rectangular Titantrons. Later productions gained the ability to move the Ovaltron either to the left or to the right of the stage. In August 2001, as part of celebrating SmackDown!'s second anniversary, the show received a new logo and set, which consisted of a fist centered above the entrance with the WWF/E scratch logo above it, and many glass panes along the sides strongly resembling shattered glass with two TitanTrons on each side. From September 23, 2004, to September 26, 2008, the theme song for SmackDown! was "Rise Up" by Drowning Pool, with variations, making it the longest tenured theme song used in the program.

Whenever SmackDown! shared the arena with Raw during the 2005–2007 period in a form of a supershow, the SmackDown! stage utilized all or some components of the same set from Raw.

From November 2, 2012, until April 18, 2014, SmackDown began using "Born 2 Run" by 7Lions as its theme song, with "This Life" by CFO$ and Cody B. Ware serving as the secondary theme, then a swap was made, as "Born 2 Run" was used as a secondary theme, when "This Life" is used as SmackDown's main theme. Prior to November 2, 2012, SmackDown opened with "Know Your Enemy" by Green Day while "Hangman" by Rev Theory served as the secondary theme song. Upon SmackDown's debut on Syfy in 2010, it replaced the previous theme song "Let it Roll" by Divide the Day.

As of August 3, 2012, the show has used the modified WWE HD universal set, which debuted at Raw 1000 on July 23. From September 21, 2012, until October 26, 2012, October 4, 2013, until November 1, 2013, October 3 and 31, 2014, and October 2 and 30, 2015, WWE worked in conjunction with Susan G. Komen for the Cure to raise awareness for breast cancer by adorning the SmackDown set with pink ribbons and a special pink middle-rope in the ring. SmackDown's ring ropes were usually blue from 1999 to 2012 (although they were black for a period between 2001 and 2002). They remained blue until December 2012 when they were permanently changed to white, with all WWE programming now using white ring ropes. On August 22, 2014, SmackDown switched to a full 16:9 letterbox presentation, with a down-scaled version of the native HD feed on a 4:3 SD feed.

Although the graphics were re-positioned, SmackDown continued to use a variation of the graphics package that had been in use since its first HD broadcast in January 2008, until the show moved to Thursday nights on January 15, 2015, when an all-new graphics package (now optimized for the 16:9 format) and intro video were introduced along with a revised SmackDown logo. On March 26, 2015, WWE added a small LED board to the left side of the ring on SmackDown, similar to Raw. On the September 14, 2015 season premiere of Raw, the middle rope was colored gold. Throughout the month of October 2015, the WWE broadcast table, entrance ramp, and ring skirts were co-branded with Susan G. Komen for the cure of breast cancer. Also, the middle ring rope was pink to promote the fight against breast cancer. Following the brand split in 2016, the ropes return to its original blue color as well as debuting a new set. The post brand extension set was almost identical to the TLC: Tables, Ladders and Chairs set from 2009 to 2013 and caused some negative feedback among online fans for re-using an old stage design. A month after the new set debut, a more distinctive and elaborate stage was created for SmackDown. The stage used was a new design with multiple LED side panels on each side with a titan-tron in a semi circle in the center. The new set also introduced LED floor panels on the entrance ramp. Feedback was more positive for this set design.

With the shift to Fox, both Raw and SmackDown introduced new sets during their "premiere week". The new set featured a large TitanTron screen, with semi-arches partially resembling the original SmackDown stage.

Due to the COVID-19 pandemic, all WWE programs suspended touring shows from mid-March 2020 through mid-July 2021. All SmackDown broadcasts were filmed behind closed doors with no in-person spectators, initially from the WWE Performance Center in Orlando, before returning to an arena setting with a closed set known as the "ThunderDome"—which featured a larger-scale production more in line with its PPV shows, but with a virtual audience displayed on a grandstand constructed from video boards.

With the return to live shows in July 2021, a new universal stage was adopted by both SmackDown and Raw, with a high-resolution LED screen, and increasing use of augmented reality graphics for the television production.

Since January 3, 2025, SmackDown introduced a blue ring mat which the blue shading would change in the following weeks to be a slightly lighter shade of blue. The new standard announce table design, which debuted on the Raw debut on Netflix, was unveiled the next week.

Song title	Written and/or performed by	Dates used	Ref
"Smack"^{2}	Jim Johnston	April 29, 1999 – August 9, 2001	
"The Beautiful People"	Marilyn Manson	August 16, 2001 – May 15, 2003	
"I Want It All"	Jim Johnston	May 22, 2003 – September 16, 2004	
"Rise Up"^{3}	Drowning Pool	September 23, 2004 – September 26, 2008	
"If You Rock Like Me"	Jim Johnston	October 3, 2008 – September 25, 2009	
"Let It Roll"	Divide the Day	October 2, 2009 – September 24, 2010	
"Know Your Enemy"	Green Day	October 1, 2010 – October 19, 2012	
"Born 2 Run"	7Lions	October 26, 2012 – April 4, 2014	
"This Life"	CFO$	April 11, 2014 – January 9, 2015; this song version featuring Dylan Owen was used as the bumper song.	
"Centuries"	Fall Out Boy	October 10, 2014 (only used for SmackDown's 15th Anniversary)	
"Black and Blue"	CFO$	January 15, 2015 – July 19, 2016	
"Take a Chance"	CFO$	July 26, 2016 – September 24, 2019	
"Victorious"	Panic! at the Disco	October 16, 2018 (only used for SmackDown's 1000th episode)	
"Are You Ready"	AC/DC	October 4, 2019 – October 14, 2022	
"Prime Time Open"	Jim Johnston	May 7, 2021 (only used for Throwback SmackDown!)	
"Nobody Better Than Me"	def rebel ft. Supreme Madness	October 21, 2022 – September 6, 2024	
"Red"	Hardy ft. Morgan Wallen	December 8, 2023 (only used for Tribute to the Troops 2023)	
“Neva Play”	Megan Thee Stallion ft. RM	September 13, 2024 – September 4, 2026	
“Let 'Em Know” ^{1}	T.I.	September 11, 2026 – present	

Notes

1. Bold song titles are currently being used as the opening theme.
2. Also titled as "Everybody on the Ground" prior to the release of the WWE: Uncaged series.
3. The first version was an instrumental composed by Jim Johnston and it was only used on September 23, 2004, for SmackDown's 5th Anniversary. Another version was performed by Ryan McCombs entitled "Rise Up 2006" and was used from March 24, 2006.

== Cultural references ==
On July 10, 2007, Merriam-Webster included the word smackdown in Webster's Dictionary. Merriam Webster defined a "smackdown" as:

- The act of knocking down or bringing down an opponent.
- A contest in entertainment wrestling.
- A decisive defeat.
- A confrontation between rivals or competitors.

The Oxford English Dictionary traces the use of the word smackdown in English back at least as far as 1990, but notes that a professional wrestling television show "popularized" the term.

== Special episodes ==
Throughout its broadcast history, the show has aired editions that have different themes. These include tributes to various professional wrestlers who have recently died or retired from actively performing, and episodes commemorating various show milestones or anniversaries.

== Other SmackDown-branded properties ==
Although SmackDown has been the second-largest show in the WWE, the company's use of the term went beyond its namesake program. During the 2000 U.S. election campaign, the WWE launched the SmackDown! Your Vote program.

The name was also used when WWE released its 2015 film The Flintstones & WWE: Stone Age SmackDown! and WWE Network's show Kitchen SmackDown!.

== Roster ==
The wrestlers featured on WWE take part in scripted feuds and storylines. Wrestlers are portrayed as heroes, villains, or less distinguishable characters in scripted events that build tension and culminate in a wrestling match.

The primary commentators for SmackDown are Joe Tessitore and Wade Barrett. Since 2024, they switch brands with Raw's Michael Cole and Corey Graves for the last four months of the year to accommodate Tessitore’s ESPN college football commitments . Additional commentary has been provided by Tazz, Jim Ross, Jerry Lawler, Josh Mathews, Mauro Ranallo, Tom Phillips and others since its creation.

Since March 2025, Mark Nash is WWE SmackDown's lead ring announcer.

== Broadcast ==
=== Broadcast history ===
Channel	Timeslot	Years
UPN	Thursday 8–10 p.m. ET	April 29, 1999
UPN	Thursday 8–10 p.m. ET	August 26, 1999 – September 1, 2005
UPN	Friday 8–10 p.m. ET	September 9, 2005 – September 15, 2006
The CW	Friday 8–10 p.m. ET	September 22, 2006 – September 26, 2008
MyNetworkTV	Friday 8–10 p.m. ET	October 3, 2008 – September 24, 2010
Syfy	Friday 8–10 p.m. ET	October 1, 2010 – January 9, 2015
Syfy	Thursday 8–10 p.m. ET	January 15, 2015 – December 31, 2015
USA	Thursday 8–10 p.m. ET	January 7, 2016 – July 14, 2016
USA	Tuesday 8–10 p.m. ET	July 19, 2016 – September 24, 2019
Fox	Friday 8–10 p.m. ET	October 4, 2019 – September 6, 2024
USA	Friday 8–10 p.m. ET	September 13, 2024 – present
USA	Friday 8–11 p.m. ET	January 3, 2025 – present

==== Latin America ====
SmackDown aired on Azteca 7 from 2008 until 2014 and airs live on Fox Sports in Mexico and across Central and South America since 2014 until 2021.

==== Canada ====
In Canada, SmackDown was previously aired on Sportsnet 360 (SN360, formerly known as The Score), as part of a long-term deal with Rogers Sports & Media. The program was mostly aired in simulcast with the American airing but was broadcast the previous day from January 2015 to July 2016. This was due to conflicts with the channel's Thursday-night National Hockey League broadcasts. In 2005, when the taped show moved to Friday airings in the United States, it remained on Thursdays in Canada for a period of time.

When SmackDown transitioned to a live format in July 2016, the program returned to airing in simulcast with the American broadcast, initially on Tuesdays and then moving back to Fridays in October 2019. Despite the move to Fox (which is widely carried on Canadian television providers) in 2019, Rogers did not elect to simulcast SmackDown on its broadcast network Citytv to invoke potential simsub rights.

As Rogers also held the rights to National Hockey League broadcasts, the program was occasionally pre-empted to OLN during the Stanley Cup playoffs.

All archived broadcasts of SmackDown were available on the WWE Network until its closure in December 2024. Since January 1, 2025, WWE’s Canadian broadcast rights are held by Netflix. Select archived episodes are available for streaming on Netflix under the title SmackDown Vault, with live broadcasts beginning on January 10. The January 3 episode was streamed on WWE’s YouTube channel. The show does not air on the Canadian iteration of USA Network, which launched on the former Discovery Channel space on January 1.

==== Asia, Africa and Oceania ====
SmackDown airs live in the MENA region on Netflix on Saturday mornings.

SmackDown airs live in Australia on Saturday late mornings/early afternoons and Sunday afternoons on Fox8 and Friday nights on 9Go! as a one-hour version, and airs live in New Zealand and Australia on Netflix.

SmackDown airs in Fiji on Sky Pacific and Sky Fiji.

SmackDown airs live in Pakistan and in Bangladesh, Nepal, Sri Lanka and India on Sony Ten and Kenya on Kenya Broadcasting Corporation.

SmackDown airs in Malaysia on Astro SuperSport 4.

The series airs in the Philippines on TAP Sports including its streaming counterpart Blast TV.

SmackDown airs live in Indonesia on Mola TV.

The series airs live in Singapore on Starhub's HubSports 2 and South Africa on SuperSport

SmackDown airs on Abema in Japan.

SmackDown airs in Israel on 5LIVE.

In South Africa, SmackDown was previously broadcast by free-to-air broadcaster e.tv. The show would play on Wednesday nights in the evening, with a 7-day delay, edited to one hour and was one of the most watched programs on the channel. However, in 2017 e.tv decided not to renew its broadcasting deal with WWE. The rights were later resold to SuperSport (the initial broadcasters of WWE programming) who broadcast the show across Sub-Saharan Africa, live and uncut.

In 2019 SuperSport, along with its parent company Multichoice, signed a deal to broadcast the 24-hour WWE channel on their DStv platform.

==== Europe ====
In Portugal, SmackDown airs live on SportTV 4 every Saturday at 01:00 WET.

In Russia, SmackDown aired on Match! Fighter with Russian commentary until 2022, when WWE ceased broadcasting their programs in Russia in response to the Russian invasion of Ukraine.

In Finland, SmackDown airs on Subtv (2001–2006) in a shortened version with a three-week delay. MTV3 MAX began showing SmackDown and also RAW and ECW which later changed to NXT (2007–2010). SmackDown and Raw started showing again on MTV Sub (2021–2022).

In Spain, SmackDown airs on Mega every Sunday at 13:00 CET.

In the United Kingdom and Ireland, SmackDown airs live on Netflix, alongside Raw and NXT.

In Malta, SmackDown airs on Netflix, the same as all.EU countries.

In Germany, SmackDown airs on ProSieben MAXX Saturdays at 22:00 CET.

In Belgium, SmackDown airs on Saturday on ABXplore. It also airs on AB1 in France. Both are commented by Philippe Chereau and Christophe Agius.

In 2017, SmackDown began airing on S Sport and S Sport Plus in Turkey, continuing until 2023.

=== Online streaming ===
On May 22, 2009, Hulu and WWE agreed to air full episodes of SmackDown to be available for viewing the day following its original airing. On September 24, 2012, Hulu signed a multi-year deal with WWE to stream all of the company's TV shows and some of its web series, which includes SmackDown. Full episodes of SmackDown are available for viewing the following day of its original airing. All previous episodes of SmackDown are available on the WWE Network, where recent episodes are available for on-demand viewing 30 days after the original air date.

Outside the United States, SmackDown airs on Netflix and archived episodes of this series are branded as SmackDown Vault.

== See also ==
- List of professional wrestling television series
- List of longest-running American television series
