= Aurelia (name) =

Aurelia (also spelled Aurelía, Aurélia or Aurelija) is a feminine given name from the Latin family name Aurelius, which was derived from aureus meaning "golden".

Aurelia may refer to:

== Pre-modern world ==
- Aurelia (mother of Caesar) (c. 120 BC–54 BC), Roman noblewoman
- Aurelia Orestilla (c. 1st century BCE), wife of Catiline
- Aurelia Paulina, 2nd century noblewoman
- Aurelia of Regensburg (died 1027), Roman Catholic saint
- Aurelia of Strasbourg, 4th-century saint

== Modern era ==
- Aurélia Beigneux (born 1980), French politician
- Aurelia Brădeanu (born 1979), Romanian handballer
- Aurelia E. Brazeal (born 1943), American diplomat
- Aurelia Browder (1919–1971), African-American civil rights activist
- Aurelia Ciurea (born 1982), Romanian aerobic gymnast
- Aurelia Correia (died 1875), Euro-African slave trader
- Aurelia Courtney (born 2014), daughter of American Bravo TV stars Nadine Jolie Courtney and Erik Courtney
- Aurelia Dobre (born 1972), Romanian gymnast
- Aurelia Frick (born 1975), Liechtenstein politician, Minister of Foreign Affairs from 2009 to 2019
- Aurelia Greene (1934–2021), American politician
- Aurelia Harwood (1865–1928), American conservationist
- Aurelia Kitzu Arimondi (1860s–1941), Romanian singer and voice teacher
- Aurelia Litsner De Fere (1835–1917), Hungarian musician
- Aurelia Mace (1835–1910), Shaker eldress
- Aurelija Mikušauskaitė (1937–1974), Lithuanian actress
- Aurelia Molins (1582–1641), English midwife
- Aurélia Petit (born 1971), French actress
- Aurelia Pentón (born 1941), Cuban track and field athlete
- Aurelia Plath (1906–1994), American professor, mother of American poet Sylvia Plath
- Aurelia Pucinski (born 1947), American judge
- Aurelia Ramos de Segarra (1860–1927), Uruguayan philanthropist
- Aurelia Henry Reinhardt (1877–1948), American educator and activist
- Aurélia de Souza (1867–1922), Portuguese painter
- Aurelia Szőke-Tudor (1936–2013), Romanian handballer
- Aurélia Thierrée (born 1971), French actress, dancer, and model
- Aurelia Tizón (1902–1938), first wife of Argentine president Juan Perón
- Aurelia Trywiańska (born 1976), Polish hurdler
- Aurelia N. Young (1915–2010), American musician, music educator, and civil rights activist
- Aurelia Zwartte, Dutch poet

== See also ==
- Aurélie
- Aurelia (disambiguation)
- Aurelianum
