= Les Voyageurs de l'Impériale =

1941 novel by Louis Aragon

Les voyageurs de l'impériale is a novel by Louis Aragon, first published in an English translation by Hannah Josephson in 1941 and in the original French in 1946, as the third volume of his Le Monde Réel cycle. The novel reflects Aragon's observations of French society's attitudes toward the Spanish Civil War and the prelude to World War II. Conceived as a counterpoint to the preceding volume, Les Beaux Quartiers, which promotes a model of socially engaged behavior rooted in Aragon's leftist convictions, Les voyageurs de l'impériale critiques voluntary withdrawal from politics in favor of pursuing short-term personal goals.

== Background ==
Aragon wrote the third volume of Le Monde Réel inspired by his experiences from 1936 to 1939. In October 1936, he and his wife, Elsa Triolet, joined a delegation from the International Association in Defense of Culture to Spain, delivering medicines and books to Spanish creators amid the Spanish Civil War. Influenced by this experience, Aragon publicly opposed France's non-intervention policy in support of the Spanish Republic and urged intellectuals to engage in political life, advocating for democracy, workers' rights, and socialism. He intended the novel, begun alongside Les Beaux Quartiers after publishing The Bells of Basel, to carry this message. It continues themes from Le Monde Réel, such as the critique of French capitalism and the role of individuals in society. In June 1949, Aragon explained:

I wanted to provide another portrayal of the decline of the French bourgeoisie, alongside a portrait of the French individualist, to show how individualism leads to human degradation.

For Aragon, individualism meant indifference to society, nationality, and loved ones, a stance he condemned, marking his break from his earlier surrealist beliefs.

The writing, started after returning from Spain, spanned three years due to Aragon's political activities in the French Communist Party and the anti-war movement. From 1 March 1937, he served as editor-in-chief of the leftist newspaper Ce Soir until its suspension on 25 August 1939. Only then did work on Les voyageurs de l'impériale accelerate. Between 25 August and 2 September 1939, Aragon completed the novel, sending one of two manuscript copies to his publisher. He carried the second during his military service, including the French retreat from Dunkirk, through which he reached Britain. The novel was first published in the United States in English in 1941 by Duell, Sloan and Pearce, in a translation by Hannah Josephson; the French edition followed in 1946.

== Plot ==
The novel spans from 1889 to the outbreak of World War I in 1914.

=== Part one ===
Pauline and Pierre Mercadier, a moderately wealthy couple initially in love, see their marriage deteriorate. Pierre, a former history teacher and art enthusiast, becomes a stock market speculator to amass wealth quickly, neglecting his family, friends, and son Pascal's upbringing, feeling life's futility.

During a vacation at Sainteville Castle, 40-year-old Pierre begins an affair with impoverished aristocrat Blanche Pailleron, which she ends to focus on raising her daughter. This reinforces his belief in life's absurdity, rooted in hypocrisy. He briefly returns to his family, loses his fortune in new speculations, and abandons his wife and child in poverty.

=== Part two ===
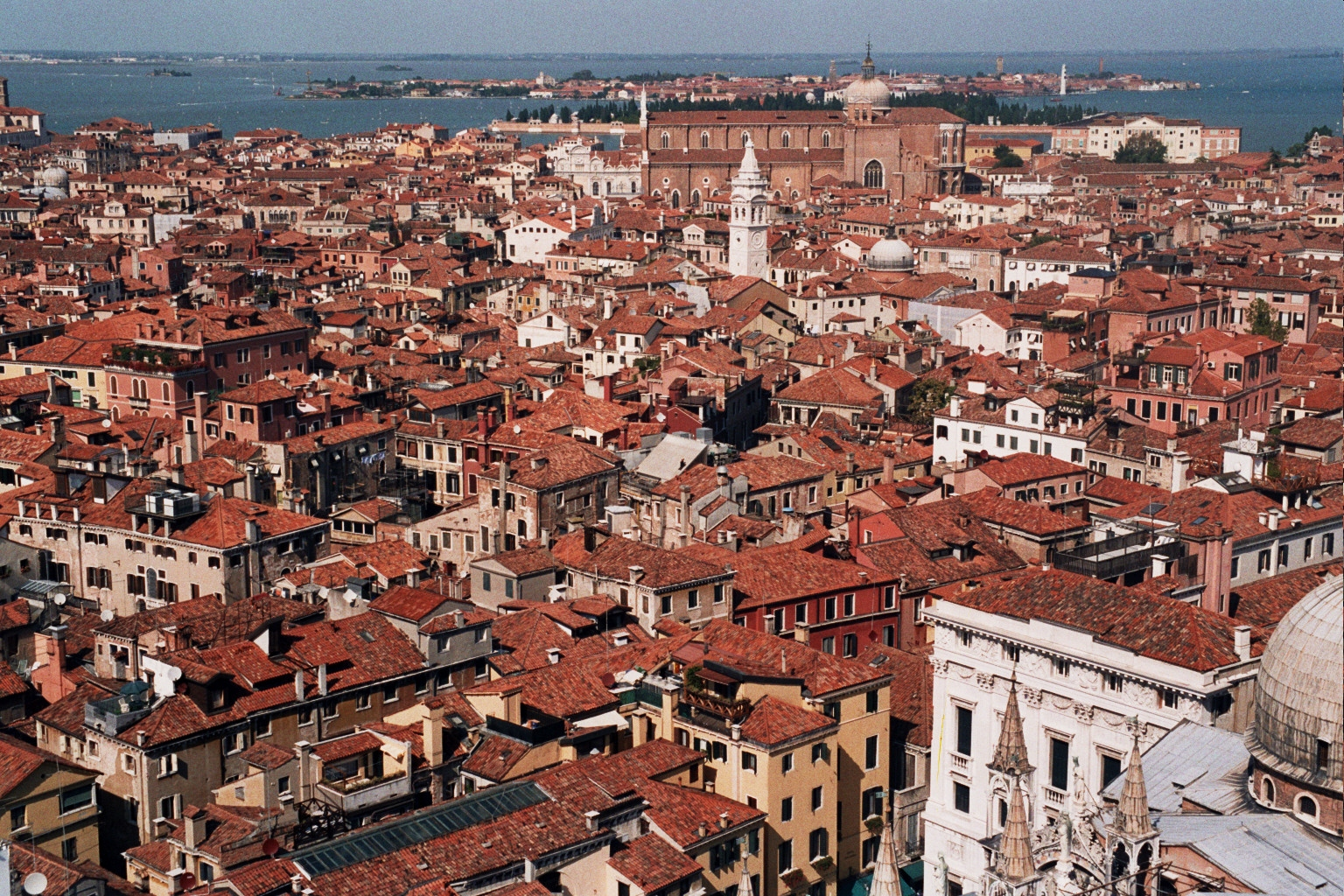
Panorama of Venice. Pierre's visit and reflections on Italy's history, especially the conquests of condottieri, inspire his pursuit of a life driven by fleeting desires

Pierre travels Europe, mingling with gamblers and speculators, observing social dynamics and visiting places from his art history studies. A brief platonic relationship with Regina in Monte Carlo ends when he learns she is another's mistress. His travels in Italy solidify his egoism: believing he cannot achieve historical significance like his ancestors, he resolves to wander and satisfy immediate desires. He visits Egypt and America over a decade. A failed stock market venture forces his return to France, destitute. In Paris, he realizes his cherished freedom depended on wealth, sinking into apathy.

=== Part three ===
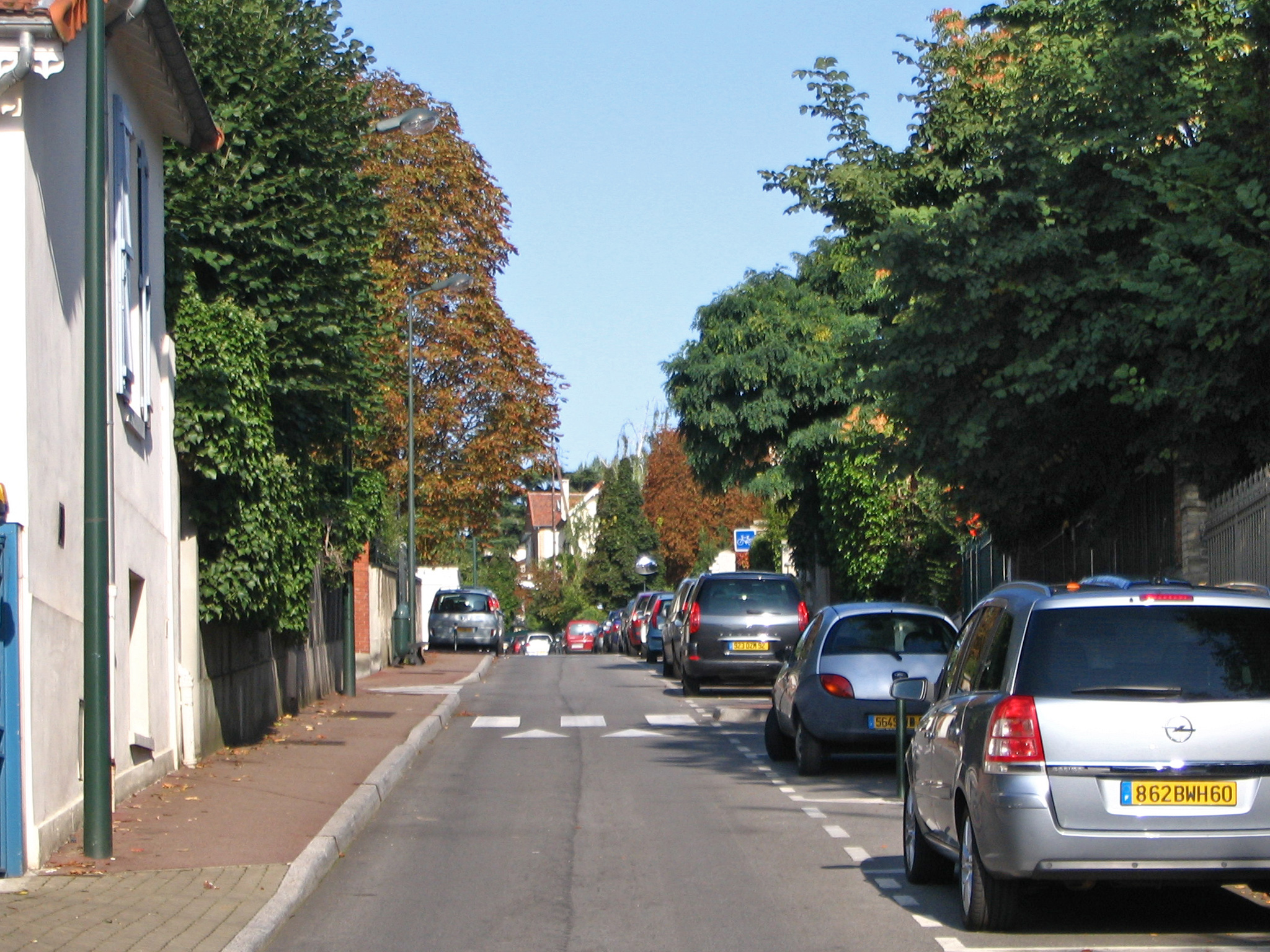
View of Garches, the setting for the novel's third part

Years later, penniless Pierre accepts a teaching position through an old friend's help, living in isolation and indifferent to Dora, a woman his age who loves him. He finds solace only in watching his grandson play. Meanwhile, Pascal, working to support himself and his mother, marries a childhood friend but fails to make her happy, echoing his father's mistakes. Her death devastates him. Pierre attempts to reconnect with Pascal via letter but dies of a paralytic attack in Dora's villa in Garches in 1914. Pascal, enlisting in the war, never meets his father again. As a soldier, he attributes the war's outbreak to the previous generation's individualism, which ignored societal flaws, enabling the catastrophe.

== Characteristics ==
=== Title ===
Bernard Lecherbonnier interprets the title as a metaphor for Aragon's view of individuals in capitalist society: life is a stagecoach heading toward death, its path shaped by factors known to few passengers, most of whom passively accept circumstances. Julian Rogoziński and Zofia Jaremko-Pytowska argue that the "travelers" are specific individuals – individualist intellectuals like Pierre Mercadier. Rogoziński notes:

By placing his travelers in the stagecoach, Aragon defined their position in history. They reside on its margins, on byways where an outdated vehicle drags them toward death.

The title underscores the novel's critique of individualism.

=== Critique of individualism ===
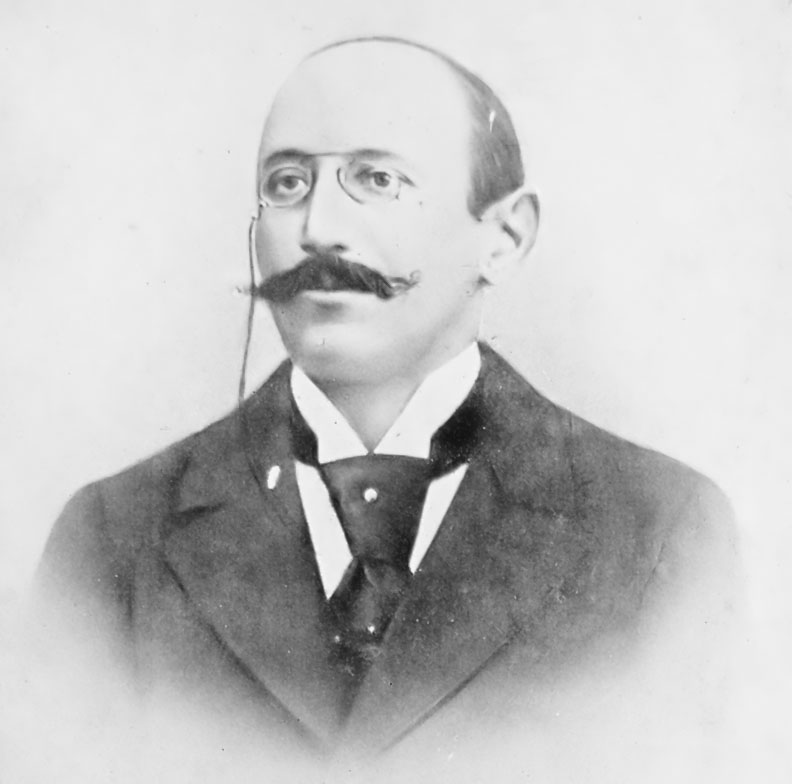
Alfred Dreyfus. The Dreyfus affair polarized France, sparking debates. Pierre's refusal to take a stance, even privately, symbolizes his detachment from societal issues

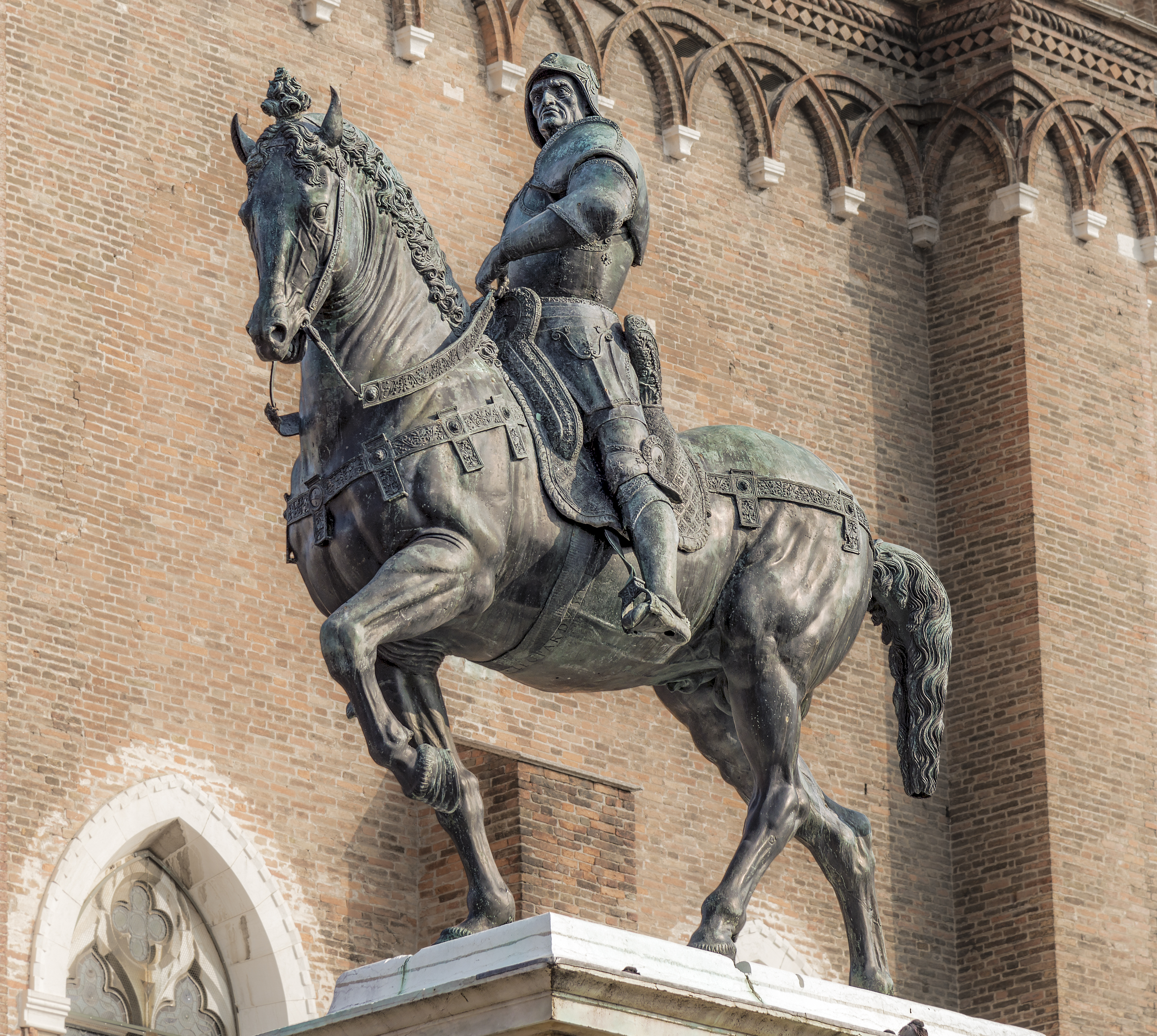
Statue of condottiero Colleoni in Venice, described in the novel. Pierre reflects on it, reinforcing his belief in his selfish choices, with Colleoni embodying triumphant egoism

Aragon aimed to demonstrate the superiority of social engagement over political disengagement and personal fulfillment. After portraying positive figures like Catherine Simonidze and Armand Barbentane in earlier volumes, this novel and Aurélien focus on negative examples. Jaremko-Pytowska describes Pierre Mercadier as one of Aragon's "most somber and irritating" characters, judged more harshly than Aurélien. Aragon deliberately exaggerates Pierre's traits, openly scorning his worldview.

By presenting Mercadier's successive moral failures – the collapse of his family, his inability to love, the sense of futility in his actions – the author points to the character's excessive individualism as the root cause of his progressive downfall. The protagonist is uninterested in any form of social engagement, focusing solely on preserving his personal freedom, which he understands as the refusal to undertake any commitments and, consequently, his constant exclusion from all communities and complete isolation. He ostentatiously ignores major events like the Dreyfus affair and the Armenian genocide, refusing to express opinions even privately. While intelligent, Pierre recognizes societal conventions – class divisions, behavioral norms, and institutions like marriage – as constraints but fails to propose alternatives, remaining a passive participant. His critique aligns with Marxist ideas.

By showing the protagonist's rejection of successive social conventions, Aragon questions the value of the "freedom" Mercadier boasts of: he stresses that Pierre's actions – which the character sees as iconoclastic and anti-social – actually conform to the very logic of capitalist society that he sought to escape. The protagonist observes society insightfully and exposes its hypocrisy and artificiality, yet he remains part of it himself, aspiring to wealth (through speculation on the stock market) and fame (by writing a biography of John Law). His reflections are limited to criticism of the status quo without considering any possibilities for improvement; he remains a passive character. Symbolically, on his deathbed, Pierre can utter only the word "politics", seemingly understanding at last the means by which he should have resisted the social order. In line with the author's socialist beliefs, the protagonist's entire generation is deemed lost – its members were concerned only with their personal freedom instead of engaging socially, particularly in the workers' struggle. J. Bernard disagrees with this interpretation, suggesting that the utterance of a meaningless word in the moment of death merely confirms the complete failure of Mercadier's life aspirations.

Aragon stresses that Mercadier's fate was not determined by his social background but by his own choice of lifestyle and life goals. Unlike in earlier volumes of the cycle, the author presents both the social and psychological motivations of his characters, abandoning simplistic links between their environment and their decisions. Pierre's downfall thus stems from his inability to conduct a full social analysis, but also from personal selfishness and a shallow understanding of happiness. This does not imply, however, that politics and history had no impact on individual lives. Aragon highlights that even though Mercadier ostentatiously turned away from them, major events always ultimately shaped his fate – the prevailing drive toward wealth shaped his worldview, and the Panama financial scandal caused him to lose his last remaining funds.

Aragon's critique of individualism culminates in the novel's ending, in which Paskal Mercadier, before leaving for war, reads the unfinished biography of Law written by his virtually unknown father, and through it comes to at least partially understand his worldview. He concludes that it was the stance of social withdrawal, adopted by the previous generation of intellectuals, that led to the outbreak of world war. Those who could have addressed the flaws of the existing order and prevented the escalation of international tensions instead pursued personal freedom and refused political engagement. Paskal's harsh condemnation of his father's attitude stands as the novel's final message. Hence, Garaudy describes Les voyageurs de l'impériale as a novel about responsibility – a fundamental principle in both interpersonal and social relationships. Emphasising the influence that individuals' attitudes can exert on entire communities, Aragon, according to Garaudy, reveals the dramatic consequences of human selfishness on both micro (family tragedies) and macro (international conflict) levels.

A different interpretation of the novel was offered by Jacqueline Bernard. She argues that the work transcends the ideological framework its author intended, and that its portrayal of individualism and the quest for absolute freedom is more ambiguous than Aragon himself claimed. According to Bernard, while writing the novel, Aragon was still fascinated by the pursuit of personal liberty, even if in public he condemned such a position. That is why he gave the psychologically negative character a more detailed and nuanced portrayal than those characters presented as role models.

=== Social analysis ===
In Les voyageurs de l'impériale, Aragon aimed to present a further in-depth analysis of the workings of the capitalist world, particularly emphasising the dominant role of money in shaping human fate. He drew on the work of Honoré de Balzac and especially on those of his novels whose protagonists were bankers, usurers, and misers (Eugénie Grandet, Gobseck, La Maison Nucingen). However, money appears in the novel in a dual context – both as the driving force of human activity in capitalist society and as a factor that strips individuals of their natural qualities and emotions. While criticising the society around him, Mercadier unconsciously adopts its most widespread ambition – the desire to get rich – which he attempts to fulfil through gambling. Yet his individualism prevents him from focusing on saving and accumulating capital, which he also sees as a restriction of personal freedom. On the other hand, he recognises that only wealth would allow him to fully realise his desires. The second aspect of money is embodied in the figure of an elderly woman addicted to casino gambling, whom the protagonist meets in Monte Carlo. The woman is devoid of any feelings and seeks only to continue playing.

The unequivocal social interpretation presented by Aragon has led to Les voyageurs de l'impériale – like other works from Le Monde Réel cycle – being classified as a piece of socialist realist literature. Bernard, however, argues that while Aragon himself identified his works with this current and considered it the most essential form of contemporary literature, his novels go beyond the norms of socialist realism as promoted in the Soviet Union.

=== Exploration of love ===
The novel is also an exploration of the human capacity for love. The novel's main character experiences passionate love on several occasions: as a young man, as a 40-year-old, and finally becomes the object of the obsessive affection of the aging Dora, the owner of a brothel. The novel poses the question of whether true love is genuinely possible, or whether it is merely a literary construct, born of human imagination. According to Lecherbonnier, Aragon juxtaposes the passion and romanticism of "forbidden" extramarital affairs with the reality of marriage, which he portrays as destroying what was once a great emotional bond. He argues that the very existence of the institution of marriage is one of the tools used by an oppressively structured society to suppress true human psychology as well as the individual's pursuit of happiness. The only ideal form of love that appears genuinely achievable in the novel is the nurturing affection Dora shows to the paralysed, dying Pierre at the end – a situation that becomes possible only because Pierre is no longer capable of taking action or resisting anything.

Garaudy, on the other hand, highlights the connection between the inability to love and the dehumanisation of the individual caused by a blind pursuit of wealth and a similarly reckless focus on personal freedom, regardless of the consequences.

=== Structure ===
Les voyageurs de l'impériale is regarded as an important milestone in Aragon's development as a novelist. For the first time in his work, the portrayal of characters and their actions is based equally on internal (psychological) and external (social) factors. As a result, his protagonists are far less determined by their environment and considerably less predictable in their behaviour than those in his earlier works. According to Jacqueline Bernard, the novel also contains elements of roman noir and of fantastic fiction. She points out that Les voyageurs de l'impériale is largely a novel about the transformation of an orderly world, structured around widely accepted values, into chaos. This transformation is triggered by Pierre Mercadier's wholly irrational decision to abandon all the principles that had previously governed his life – a decision that inevitably leads to his personal downfall. Bernard also highlights Aragon's distinctive way of describing each successive setting, which serves to underscore the protagonist's gradual decline.

These shifts in the protagonist's thoughts and behaviour are mirrored in the novel's narrative structure. The first part, in which Pierre Mercadier is still engaged with society, consists of a series of short episodes and secondary storylines that provide insight into the prevailing social dynamics. This section is written in a style reminiscent of the 19th-century French realist novel. In the second part, the narrator focuses on Mercadier's reflections, which are shaped by his travels; narrative time in this portion of the novel nearly comes to a standstill. The third part of the book, in turn, adopts a structure that echoes that of the naturalist novel.

== Bibliography ==
- Aragon, L. (1960). Pasażerowie z dyliżansu [The Travelers of the Imperial] (in Polish). Warszawa: Państwowy Instytut Wydawniczy. p. 886.
- Bernard, J. (1984). Aragon. La permanence de surréalisme dans le cycle du monde réel [Aragon. The Persistence of Surrealism in the Real World Cycle] (in French). Librairie Jose Corti. ISBN 2-7143-0071-5.
- Garaudy, R. (1965). Droga Aragona. Od nadrealizmu do świata rzeczywistego [Aragon's Path. From Surrealism to the Real World] (in Polish). Warsaw: Państwowy Instytut Wydawniczy.
- Jaremko-Pytowska, Z. (1963). Louis Aragon (in Polish). Warsaw: Wiedza Powszechna.
- Lecherbonnier, B. (1971). Aragon (in French). Paris: Bordas.
