= Aurélien (given name) =

- Gender: Male

Origin
- Region of origin: France, Francophone nations and territories

Other names
- Related names: Aurélie (feminine form)

see also Aurélien, a 1944 novel by Louis Aragon.

Aurélien is a French masculine given name and may refer to:

- Aurélien Agbénonci (born 1958), Beninese diplomat
- Aurélien Barrau (born 1973), French physicist and philosopher
- Aurélien Bélanger (1878–1953), Canadian politician
- Aurélien Bellanger (born 1980), French writer and actor
- Aurélien Boche (born 1981), French footballer
- Aurélien Brulé (born 1979), French founder of Kalaweit Project
- Aurélien Capoue (born 1982), French footballer
- Aurélien Chedjou (born 1986), Cameroonian footballer
- Aurélien Clerc (born 1979), Swiss road bicycle racer
- Aurélien Collin (born 1986), French footballer
- Aurélien Cologni (born 1978), French rugby player and coach
- Aurélien Cotentin, aka Orelsan (born 1982), French rapper, songwriter and record producer
- Aurélien Faivre (born 1978), French footballer
- Aurélien Gay (born 2000), Swiss ski mountaineer
- Aurélien Gill (1933–2015), Canadian politician
- Aurélien Hérisson (born 1990), Brazilian-born French footballer
- Aurélien Joachim (born 1986), Luxembourgish footballer
- Aurélien Kahn (born 1968), French equestrian and Olympic competitor
- Aurélien Marie Lugné aka Lugné-Poe (1869–1940), French actor, theatre director and scenic designer
- Aurélien Mazel (born 1982), French footballer
- Aurélien Montaroup (born 1985), French footballer
- Aurélien Nattes (born 1984), French footballer
- Aurélien Ngeyitala (born 1994), Congolese footballer
- Aurélien Noël (1904–1991), Canadian politician
- Aurélien Panis (born 1994), French racing driver
- Aurélien Passeron (born 1984), French road racing cyclist
- Aurélien Recoing (born 1958), French actor
- Aurélien Rougerie (born 1980), French rugby player
- Aurélien Saintoul (born 1988), French politician
- Aurélien Sauvageot (1897–1988), French linguist
- Aurélien Scholl (1833–1902), French author and journalist
- Aurélien Taché (born 1984), French politician
- Aurélien Tchouaméni (born 2000), French footballer
- Aurélien Wiik (born 1980), French actor and filmmaker
