= Aranka (given name) =

Aranka (Serbian Cyrillic: Аранка) is a Hungarian feminine given name. It is derived from the Hungarian word arany ('gold') and is cognate to the names Aurelia and Aurélie. Notable people with the name include:

- Aranka Binder (born 1966), Serbian-Hungarian sport shooter
- Aranka Hennyei (1900–1987), Hungarian gymnast
- Aranka Kops (born 1995), Dutch rowing cox
- Aranka Goijert (1941–2022), Dutch politician
- Aranka Munk, (1862–1941), Hungarian art collector
- Aranka Siegal, Hungarian-American writer and Holocaust survivor
- Aranka Szabó-Bartha (1926–2018), Hungarian sprinter
- Aranka Szeiler (1909–1982), Hungarian gymnast
- Aranka Szentpétery (1933–2023), Slovak-Hungarian actress
