= Radio Kalaweit =

Radio Kalawelt
- Palangka Raya; Indonesia
- Frequency: 99.1 MHz

Programming
- Language: Indonesian
- Format: Contemporary hit radio, environmental conservation

Ownership
- Owner: Kalaweit Project

History
- First air date: 2003
- Last air date: 30 June 2022

Radio Kalaweit (also reportedly known as Kalaweit Radio), was a radio station in Palangka Raya, Central Kalimantan, Indonesia. The station was founded by the Kalaweit Project, itself founded by French-born Aurélien Brulé (better known as Chanee Kalaweit). The station broadcast on 99.1 MHz for most of its existence and carried a contemporary-hit radio format, interspersed with messages about gibbon conservation.

== History ==
Chanee Kalaweit created Radio Kalaweit in 2003, targeting the 15–25 age demoraphic. Initially, the station operated on 99.5 MHz with Chanee as the only announcer, but was quickly joined by Willy and Tonjik. The station broadcast from Mahoni Indah, but moved to Palangka Raya and to 99.1 Mhz at an unspecified date. Police raided its office in 2006 to confiscate the transmitter, but this failed because the DJs were locked in and broadcast the raid. A growing number of villagers (five, then 10, then 15) went to its studios to enable the resumption of normal operations. Its peak popularity came in 2007.

Three programs from Radio Kalaweit stood out in the mid-late 2000s: Misscalled Planet Fun, in which the staff made prank calls by phone, One Night With Chanee, where Chanee talked with listeners by telephone, giving them positive suggestions, and Morning Soul Speed Up, presented by Vitra, who later died.

Radio Kalaweit had a hits format throughout its existence. The playlist was dominated by Anglophone singers, though by June 2012, per an AFP visit to the station, it also carried K-pop tracks. Every two or three songs, the station broadcast messages calling for locals to preserve gibbons. Five years after its creation, the region was devoid of animal markets. In 2012, the station broadcast an endorsement from French-Indonesian singer Anggun, who spoke to oppose the treatment of gibbons as pets. The station was still popular nearly a decade after its founding, recording in June 2012 an estimated 10,000 to 15,000 listeners every day. Commercials funded the station, which enabled it to be self-financed.

On 13 May 2022, Chanee announced Radio Kalaweit would shut down on 1 June, after 19 years on air, because radio was no longer an efficient way to deliver environmental messages to young people, and that social media does that efficiently, without requiring staff salaries or electricity. No plans for the foundation following the closure of the station were announced, but Kalaweit would continue using its social media accounts for the purpose.

== In popular culture ==
Radio Kalaweit was profiled on the BBC Two documentary anthology series Natural World, in a documentary produced by Mike Birkhead Associates, titled Radio Gibbon (Good Morning Kalimantan outside the UK).
