= Aranka =

Aranka can refer to:

- Aranka (river), river in Romania and Serbia
- Aranka (given name), feminine given name
- György Aranka, Hungarian writer
