= Fenda =

Fenda may refer to:

- Chuck Fenda (born 1972), Jamaican-America reggae musician
- Fenda Lawrence, 18th-century slave trader
- Fanta, soft drink, known as Fenda in the Chinese market
