= Aurelia =

Aurelia may refer to:

== People ==
- Aurelia (name), a given name, including a list of people
- Chiara Aurelia (born 2002), American actress
- Aurelia gens, a Roman plebeian family
- Astrud Aurelia, American drag queen

== Science ==
- Aurelia (cnidarian), genus of jellyfish in the family Ulmaridae
- Aurelia, a taxonomic synonym for the plant genus Narcissus
- Aurelia, synonym for chrysalis
- Aurelia (crater), a crater on Venus
- 419 Aurelia, an asteroid
- Aurelia, a fictional Earth-sized planet orbiting a red dwarf star, subject of the 2005 television series Extraterrestrial/Alien Worlds

== Places ==
- Aurelia, medieval Latin name for Orléans
- Aurelia, Iowa, a small city in the United States

== Arts and entertainment ==
- The title character of Giraudoux's play The Madwoman of Chaillot
- Aurelia (telenovela), a Mexican telenovela
- “Aurelia”, a hymn tune for "The Church's One Foundation" by Samuel Sebastian Wesley
- "Aurélia", an 1855 novella by Gérard de Nerval
- "Aurelia", a 1953 single by The Pelicans
- "Aurelia", a track from the 2017 album AFI by AFI
- Aurelia, a fictional country in Ace Combat X: Skies of Deception

== Other uses ==
- Via Aurelia, an Ancient Roman road leading north-westward from Rome
- Aurelia Finance, Swiss private bank that was a feeder fund to Bernie Madoff
- Lancia Aurelia, an automobile
- USS Aurelia (AKA-23), a US Navy attack cargo ship of World War II
- Aurelia High School, Aurelia, Iowa, United States

== See also ==
- Orillia, a city in Ontario, Canada, which may have been originally spelled "Aurelia"
