= Le Fou d'Elsa =

Le Fou d'Elsa is a 1963 lyrical poem written by Louis Aragon. Over 400 pages long, it is widely considered a masterpiece of lyrical writing.

== Synopsis ==
In this book Aragon's intellectual work is reflected through the description of Arabic and Muslim culture in both poetry and prose. Aragon describes the relationships between the Muslim and Catholic world at the time of Inquisition in Spain by using the fall of Granada and the escape of Boabdil in front of Isabella the Catholic as a background.

As most of the books of Aragon, Le Fou d'Elsa is a book about love. Aragon announces a new woman to come, a woman called Elsa, in the quote "Woman is the future of man". But Le Fou d'Elsa is not only about love. The book is also a description of the beginnings of the depression of the Muslim world, first with the fall of Granada until the colonization.

Le Fou d'Elsa represents a political opinion as the book was written at the time of decolonization in France.
