= John Florio =

16th/17th-century English linguist and lexicographer

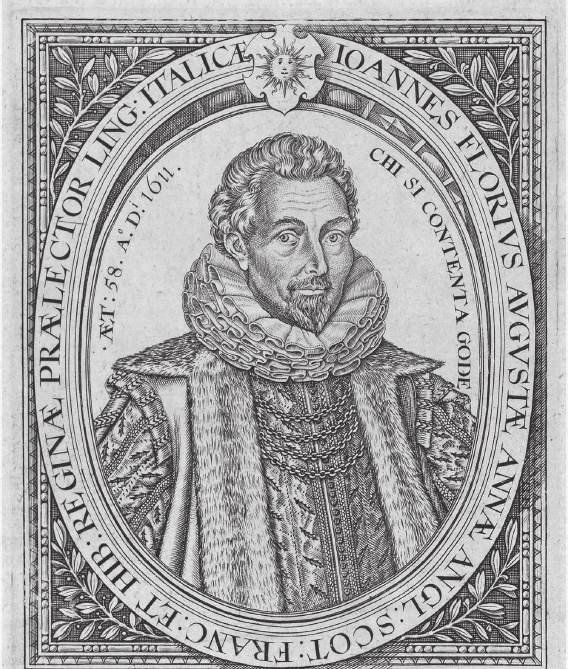
- Engraving by William Hole, 1611
- Born: 1552 or 1553; London, England
- Died: October 1625; Fulham, London
- Occupations: Linguist; poet; translator
- Era: Elizabethan; Jacobean
- Movement: English Renaissance
- Spouses: Anna Soresollo (m.1574); Rose Spicer (m. 1617)
- Children: 6 by first wife

Giovanni Florio (1552 or 1553 – 1625), known as John Florio, was an English humanist, linguist, writer, translator, lexicographer, and language tutor. Born in London, he spent much of his childhood and youth in continental Europe after his family left England during the reign of Mary I, returning to London in the early 1570s. He died of plague in Fulham, London.

He published the language-learning works Firste Fruites (1578) and Second Fruits (1591), and produced A World of Words (1598), the second Italian–English dictionary published in England, and much more extensive than William Thomas's earlier dictionary. His English translation of Montaigne's Essays was published in 1603. He published an expanded version, Queen Anna's New World of Words (1611), which contained nearly 74,000 definitions, and in 1620 he published a translation of Boccaccio's Decameron anonymously.

Florio served as tutor to Henry Wriothesley, 3rd Earl of Southampton, and from 1604 to 1619 as a reader in Italian and groom of the privy chamber to Anne of Denmark (queen consort of James VI and I). Florio also taught Italian and French to Henry Frederick, Prince of Wales. Amongst his friends and associates were Giordano Bruno and Ben Jonson.

Florio's work has been studied in relation to William Shakespeare, particularly the influence scholars have attributed to his translation of Montaigne and similarities identified between the two writers' works. In the 20th century, Florio and his father, Michelangelo Florio, were among the many people proposed by advocates of the Shakespeare authorship question as alternative authors of Shakespeare's works.

== Early life ==
John Florio was born in London in 1552 or 1553 but he grew up and lived in continental Europe until the age of 19. The only portrait of Florio, the frontispiece to the New World of Words of 1611, presents him as "Italus ore, Anglus pector" ("Italian in mouth, English in chest"); Manfred Pfister glosses this as, "in his native language an Italian, in his heart an Englishman," and interprets Florio's declaration that "I am an Englishman in Italian" to mean that he was "an Englishman with an Italian inflection or streak".

=== His father Michelangelo ===
John's father, Michelangelo Florio, born in Tuscany, had been a Franciscan friar before converting to the Protestant faith. He was a fervent Protestant with Jewish ancestors. He got into trouble with the Inquisition in Italy, after preaching in Naples, Padua, and Venice. Seeking refuge in England during the reign of Edward VI, he was appointed pastor of the Italian Protestant congregation in London in 1550. He was also a member of the household of William Cecil. He was dismissed from both on a charge of immorality, but William Cecil later fully forgave him. Little is known of Florio's mother, she was a servant in the house of Cecil and John Aubrey confirms she was Italian, writing in his Brief Lives that Florio's Italian "father and mother flew from the Valtolin (region) to London for religion" reasons and Aubrey says "the information was from Florio's grandson, Mr. Molins". Furthermore, in First Fruits, John Florio asserted that when he arrived in London (at 19 years old), he did not know the language and asked in Italian or French "where the Post dwelt". He later explained that he learnt the language by reading books.

Michelangelo Florio then became Italian tutor to Lady Jane Grey and in the family of William Herbert, 1st Earl of Pembroke, father of Henry Herbert, 2nd Earl of Pembroke who would become the husband of Mary Sidney, sister of Philip Sidney. He dedicated a book to Henry Herbert and Jane Grey, his highest-ranking pupils: Regole de la lingua thoscana (Rules of the Tuscan language). Lady Jane Grey's youth, faith, and death affected him deeply and later, in seclusion, in Soglio, in Italian-speaking Switzerland, he wrote a book about her life, titled Historia de la vita e de la morte de L'Illlustriss. Signora Giovanna Graia, published later in 1607. In the preface of the book, the anonymous publisher explained that the original book was written "by his own hand by the author" and it was found "after his death, in the home of an honored and great benefactor." It is also explained that Michelangelo "would certainly have had this book published in that he had not been prevented from very cruel persecutions. He in fact deposed it for fifty years in safe hands". He describes Lady Jane Grey as a martyr and innocent "saint". It is possible that he had witnessed some of the events surrounding her or had told her about the persecutions in Italy.

== Exile ==
When Mary Tudor ascended to the throne in 1554, she re-established Catholicism in England and Ireland. In February 1554, a royal edict proclaimed that all foreigners had to depart the realm within twenty-four days. Consequently, on 4 March 1554, Michelangelo and his family, which included infant John, left England. In Strasbourg, the generous citizens offered themselves to give a first temporary refuge to the exiles for twenty days. Here, Michelangelo had a first meeting with the noble Frederik von Salis, coming from Soglio, who invited him to become pastor of the Reformed Evangelical Church of Graubünden in Soglio.

Soglio was remote from the Inquisition and was situated near Chiavenna (north of Lake Como in Italy), a centre of Reformed preaching. In the first years of John's infancy, Michelangelo worked as pastor and notary, educating his son in an environment rich in religious and theological ferment. In addition, he taught John Italian, as well as Latin, Hebrew and Greek. Michelangelo Florio died in 1566. After this date his name is no longer mentioned, and in the synod of 1571 he is mentioned as a deceased person.

When he was ten, John Florio was sent to live with and to be schooled in a Paedagogium in Tübingen (Germany) by the Reformed Protestant theologian, Pier Paolo Vergerio, a native of Venetian Capodistria (who had also lived in Swiss Bregaglia). Under these circumstances, John was formed in the humanist cultural circle of Tübingen, in a strong Italianate atmosphere. However, Vergerio died in 1566 and John never completed his studies. Without any financial support, and an orphan at 14 years old, he left Tübingen. He came back to Soglio, and later departed for England in the early 1570s, in possession of a Christian Reformed and humanist education.

== London: First Fruits & Leicester's Men (1571–1578) ==
=== First marriage ===
At about 19 years old, after his formative years in Soglio and in Tübingen, John Florio came back to London. Ascribed to the Italian church, John worked for some years as silk dyer and servant of Michel Baynard. In addition, he worked for the Venetian merchant Gaspare Gatti, living in the wool-dyers' district of London. At 21 years old he married an Italian woman, Anna Soresollo in 1574; they had six children: Annabelle, Anne, Aurelia, Joane, Edward and Elizabeth. It has been wrongly suggested by Anthony Wood that John married Samuel Daniel's sister. No record of their marriage has so far been discovered, and Wood's suggestion was probably mainly due to Daniel's dedication lines in the 1613 second edition of Florio's translation of Montaigne's Essays in which he referred to him as his "brother", suggesting a long-time friendship, more than an actual kinship between them. However, it is possible that it was John's sister, Justina, who married Samuel Daniel. Robert Anderson, in The Works of the British Poets (1795), states that Daniel "left no issue by his wife Justina, sister of John Florio."

=== First Fruits ===
At 25 years old John Florio published Firste Fruites which yeelde familiar speech, merie prouerbes, wittie sentences, and golden sayings. Also a perfect induction to the Italian, and English tongues, as in the table appeareth. The like heretofore, neuer by any man published (1578). This collection of dramatic dialogues contains translated passages from literature and philosophy. Moreover, it is designed for novices in both the Italian and English language. Florio inscribed the manual to "All Italian gentlemen and merchants who delight in the English tongue". He dedicated his first work to Robert Dudley, Earl of Leicester. In the dedication, John reminded Dudley of his father's faithful service, successfully entering his social circle.

In the manual, John Florio refers to himself as "povero artigiano" (poor artisan). His insistence upon the fact that teaching was not his profession indicates that this was the very first time he approached the languages as a profession. In addition, the commendatory verses that precede Firste Fruites show that John Florio got in contact with the Dudley's theatre company: The Leicester's Men. The first pages of the First Fruits, in fact, contain various commendatory verses written by the company actors: Richard Tarlton, Robert Wilson, Thomas Clarke, and John Bentley. They thank him for having contributed to bring the Italian novelist to the English theatre.

With Firste Fruites, John Florio began a new career in London in language instruction while having contacts with the theatre.

== Oxford: Euphuism & Cartier's Voyages (1578–1582) ==
=== Oxford ===
By the summer of 1578, he was sent by Lord Burghley, William Cecil, to Magdalen College, Oxford. He entered as a poor scholar and became servant and tutor in Italian to Barnabe and Emmanuel Barnes, sons of the Bishop of Durham. John Florio remained at Oxford at least until 1582. Magdalen College today commemorates his time there with the John Florio Society that meets to appreciate its members' own poems.

=== Euphuism ===
During these years John matured as a lexicographer and made the development of modern English language his primary mission. Firstly, he became tutor in Italian to John Lyly. As the author considered to be the first English prose stylist to leave an enduring impression upon the language, Lyly was a key figure of Euphuism. Another Euphuist and pupil of John Florio was Stephen Gosson. Both Gosson and Lyly adopted the Euphuistic style and were saturated in Italian reading through John Florio's lessons. It is possible that another Euphuist, George Pettie, was the "I.P." who signed the Italian verses that prefaced the First Fruits.

=== Cartier's Voyages ===
In Oxford, beside his job as Italian tutor, John Florio also began a career as translator. He met Richard Hakluyt, an English writer who was very passionate about maritime literature. His collaboration with Florio was very fruitful: he commissioned him to translate Jacques Cartier's voyage to Canada. Later, in 1580, Florio published his translation under the name A Shorte and briefe narration of the two navigations and discoveries to the northweast partes called Newe Fraunce: first translated out of French into Italian by that famous learned man Gio : Bapt : Ramutius, and now turned into English by John Florio; worthy the reading of all venturers, travellers, and discoverers. Florio quickly developed an awareness of the potential of the 'New World', he advocates "planting" the "New-found land" four years before Hakluyt and Raleigh, the pioneers of colonisation. He threw himself early into the spirit of these English patriotic ventures. Furthermore, he committed himself to both refine the English language and be a contributor of England's colonial enterprise.

== At the French Embassy (1583–1585) ==
Between the summer of 1583 and 1585, John Florio moved with his family to the French embassy. It was situated in London, at Beaumont House, Butcher Row. The French ambassador at the time was Michel de Castelnau, Lord of Mauvissière. Castelnau employed Florio for two years as a tutor in languages to his daughter, Catherine Marie. Secondly, he also employed him "in other honourable employment", in the discharge of which duties he "bore himself prudently, honestly and faithfully". As a result, Florio earned the warm commendation of his master and all the household. His duties, beside that of tutor, translator and interpreter, were of personal secretary and legal representative of the ambassador when the latter departed from London.

=== The Babington Plot ===
During the captivity of Mary, Queen of Scots, several attempts were made to place her on the English throne. The most significant of these was the Babington Plot, which ultimately led to Mary's trial and execution in 1587. William Vaughan's Golden Fleece was written one year after Florio's death, in 1626, and it contains references to Florio's involvement in the conspiracy of Babington of 1586. Walsingham, also thanks to Florio's help, as suggested by Vaughan, was able to intercept and decode Mary's correspondence.

=== A Letter Lately Written from Rome (1585) ===
At the French embassy, John Florio also embarked on a new, pioneering job as translator of news. In Elizabethan England, this trend had a tremendous demand and quickly became a genre of literature. Newspapers were not yet born. Even so, Florio intuitively began to translate several Italian newsletters that had been dispatched from Rome to France, turning them into novels. The resulting pamphlet was published in 1585, entitled A letter lately written from Rome, by an Italian gentleman to a freende of his in Lyons in Fraunce, and signed I.F.

Translated from Italian, Florio dedicated it to Henry Stanley, the Earl of Derby.

It has been pointed out that no original document titled A letter lately written from Rome exist and that the work was written or at least compiled by Florio himself who borrowed news from Italy, edited them, and created an entirely different piece of work to adapt it to an English audience.

=== Giordano Bruno & The Ash Wednesday Supper ===
Living with Giordano Bruno was the most important experience Florio had at the French Embassy. Bruno's influence would have a huge impact on him. The philosopher, undoubtedly, shaped Florio's character, changing his vision of life and world permanently. John Florio embraced Bruno's philosophy, and above all, the thesis upon the infinite universe and the possibility of life on other planets, theories which went well beyond the Copernican limited heliocentric world.

Bruno received many attacks after the quarrel and tumultuous period that followed the "Ash Wednesday Supper". During that party, he discussed his revolutionary theories, and after that, he got into a quarrel with the guests who didn't receive his ideas favourably. Undoubtedly, Florio and Castelnau always defended him. Bruno described the event in a philosophical pamphlet written in Italian the same year: La cena de le ceneri (The Ash Wednesday Supper, London, 1584).

The friendship that linked Bruno and Florio is particularly rich and significant. Florio, in fact, appears in The Ash Wednesday Supper as one of the messengers who brings to Bruno the invitation to dinner by Fulke Greville. In another scene, Bruno and Florio are on a boat at night. They burst into song, chanting stanzas from Ludovico Ariosto's Orlando Furioso. Bruno would later portray him as "Eliotropo" in De la causa, principio et uno (Concerning Causality, Principle and Unity, London, 1584). In De l'infinito, universo e mondi (On The Infinite Universe and Worlds, London, 1584), fifth dialogue, Bruno adds Florio as "Elpino" and Alberico Gentili as "Albertino".

Similarly, Florio returned the compliment by introducing the figure of Bruno, "Il Nolano" (from Nola near Naples), in Second Fruits (1591). He portrayed him lounging on a window-seat, leafing through a book and poking fun at his friend John for taking too much time over getting dressed in the morning. The portrait painted by Florio is undoubtedly that of a friend. Bruno surely appears in his pages in a positive light, like a satirical and healthy whip of pedants.

Florio would never forget Giordano Bruno, even after the long years of the trial and their tragic outcome at the stake. For instance, in 1603, John Florio, in the preface of Montaigne's Essays, recalled his old "fellow Nolano", who had taught him the cultural value of translations. Moreover, in 1611, he listed Bruno's Italian works among the texts he used for the composition of the dictionary.

Bruno's scholars Gentile and Vincenzo Spampanato have both proved Florio's indebtedness to the philosopher's writings. Many of Bruno's thoughts are undeniably shaped in Florio's work Second Fruits. Also, in his two dictionaries, Florio added many terms as well as Neapolitan dialect words taken from Bruno's works.

== Second Fruits (1591) ==
Second Fruits is John Florio's second work. Entitled Second Frutes to be gathered of twelve trees, of diverse but delightful tastes to the tongues of Italian and English (1591), it appeared thirteen years after the publication of the First Fruits, and is a product of perhaps the most interesting period of his life. The dedicatory epistle is a "remarkably comprehensive sketch of current publication in the various fields of journalism, poetry, and the drama." The Epistle to the reader of the Second Fruits shows that Florio had recently been meeting with adverse criticism because of his Italian sympathies: "As for me, for it is I, and I am an Englishman in Italiane; I know they haue a knife at command to cut my throate, Un Inglese Italianato é un Diavolo Incarnato."

Defining himself an Englishman in Italiane, John Florio writes a two-fold defence of Italian culture in England and of the practise of translation. The Epistle Dedicatorie shows that Florio knew that his Second Fruits was a provocative work, and here for the first time he signs himself with the adjective that stuck to him through life and after death: Resolute John Florio. Unlike his earlier manual, Florio's Second Fruits is prefaced by a single commendatory sonnet: "Phaeton to his friend Florio". This is one of the earliest Elizabethan sonnets to be printed, and was published in the Second Fruits, an Italian language book which contains a heterogeneous stock of raw materials for contemporary sonneteers.

=== Giardino di Ricreatione ===
Proverbs were a usual feature of most Elizabethan language lesson books, but in no manual did they play such an all-important part as in the Second Fruits. The proverbs of the book are, in fact, keyed with those published in a corollary work by Florio, the Giardino di Ricreatione: six thousand Italian proverbs, without their English equivalents. It is one of the most important of the earlier collections of this kind. The title itself is interesting: Giardino di ricreatione, nel quel crescono fronde, fiori e frutti, vaghe, leggiadri e soavi; sotto nome di auree sentenze, belli proverbii, et piacevoli riboboli, tutti Italiani, colti, scelti, e scritti, per Giovanni Florio, non solo utili ma dilettevoli per ogni spirito vago della Nobil lingua Italiana. Il numero d'essi é di 3400. The proverbs in the Italian side of the dialogues are starred to indicate that they are listed among the six thousand Italian proverbs collected in the Giardino.

== Tutor to Henry Wriothesley ==
It is not certain when John Florio took the role of tutor to Henry Wriothesley, Third Earl of Southampton. Countess Clara Longworth de Chambrun was the first to suggest that Florio had been tutoring the Southampton before 1590. She points out that in Second Fruits (1591), there is a dialogue between John Florio and Henry, they play tennis together and go to see a play at the theatre.

For Frances Yates too, this identification meets with some support from the fact that in the dialogue John quotes the proverb "Chi si contenta gode", which is the motto on Florio's portrait. Moreover, the topics touched on in the Second Fruits, like primero, the theatre, love, and tennis, represent Southampton's tastes. Florio's entrance into this literary circle closely associated with the drama, marks a very important stage in his career.

When he published his first dictionary, A World of Words, in 1598, Florio dedicated his laborious work to Henry: "In truth I acknowledge an entyre debt, not onely of my best knowledge, but of all, yea of more then I know or can, to your bounteous Lordship most noble, most vertuous, and most Honorable Earle of Southampton, in whose paie and patronage I have lived some yeeres; to whom I owe and vowe the yeeres I have to live. But as to me, and manie more the glorious and gracious sunne-shine of your Honor hath infused light and life: so may my lesser borrowed light, after a principall respect to your benigne aspect, and influence, afforde some lustre to some others."

=== Danvers–Long feud ===
On Friday, 4 October 1594, John Florio took part in the famous Danvers case, backing Henry's friends in their efforts to escape. Henry Danvers and Sir Charles Denvers were the two elder sons of Sir John Danvers of Dauntsey. Both close friends of Henry Wriothesley, they committed a crime in Wiltshire. According to one account, Henry Long was dining in the middle of the day with a party of friends in Corsham when Henry Danvers, followed by his brother Charles and a number of retainers, burst into the room and shot Long dead on the spot. According to another account, Henry Long had challenged Charles Danvers, that he was pressing an unfair advantage and had his arm raised to kill. When Henry Danvers thrust himself between to ward off the blow, he was wounded in the act, and, striking upwards with his dagger, killed Henry Long accidentally.

Master Lawrence Grose, Sheriff, was informed on the murder, and on the evening of 12 October the following scene took place at Itchen's Ferry: "The said Grose, passing over Itchen’s Ferry with his wife that Saturday 12th, one Florio an Italian, and one Humphrey Drewell a servant of the Earl, being in the said passage boat threatened to cast Grose overboard, and said they would teach him to meddle with their fellows, with many other threatening words."

John Florio had a close relationship with Henry Wriothesley at least until 1603, when Henry's family, Florio and other friends of the Southampton, flocked to him when he was released from the Tower.

== A World of Words (1598) ==
While he was engaged in the service of Henry Wriothesley, Florio produced a work which remains a landmark in the history of Italian scholarship in England. A Worlde of Wordes, or Dictionarie of the Italian and English tongues (London, 1598) is an Italian–English Dictionary, and, as such, only the second of its kind in England and much fuller than the short work published by William Thomas in the 1550s – with 44,000 words as opposed to Thomas's 6,000.

Published by Edward Blount, and dedicated to Roger Manners, 5th Earl of Rutland, Henry Wriothesley, 3rd Earl of Southampton, and Lucy Russell, Countess of Bedford, this work marked Florio as a scholar of the first magnitude. In the Epistle Dedicatorie, John Florio celebrates the Italian language; however, his attitude towards the English language has now changed. If in First Fruits he found the language "besitted with manu languages" now he has moved a step nearer appreciating what he now defines the "sweete-mother-toonge" of his native land.

The cited sources that follow the "Epistle Dedicatorie" of 1598 include a corpus that is made up mostly of contemporary literary texts, ranging from Sannazaro's Arcadia and Tasso's Gerusalemme Liberata to Castiglione's Cortegiano, Della Casa's Galateo, and Caro's Lettere famigliari, as well as wide range of Dialoghi such as those written by Sperone Speroni and Stefano Guazzo.

Fourteen citations alone or one-sixth of the catalogue are sources from Pietro Aretino, highlighting Florio's interest in theatrical texts and his willingness to capitalise on his English readers' salacious interest in Aretino's explicitly erotic and sexual content. Florio was shrewd enough to realise that if his Italian-English dictionary drew much of its vocabulary from such a popular author as Aretino, it would be well received by all those who wished to study first-hand Aretino's lashing satire, bawdy language, and journalistic style.

== Shakespeare's use of Florio ==
Numerous scholars have highlighted the great influence of Florio's translation of Michel de Montaigne's Essays in Shakespeare's plays. Friedrich Nietzsche wrote that "Shakespeare was Montaigne’s best reader". Scholars like Jonathan Bate have noticed that Florio's translation of Montaigne's Essays had an impact on Shakespeare's plays, before the published translation appeared and they claim Shakespeare knew the translation before publication, but not providing any explanation or proof how Shakespeare might have known the translated work before the publication. F. O. Matthiessen, in his analysis of Florio's translation of Montaigne's Essays, suggested the similarity between Florio's and Shakespeare's style, concluding that "Shakespeare and Florio were constantly talking with the same people, hearing the same theories, breathing the same air."

Florio's biographer Clara Longworth de Chambrun made an extensive analysis of Florio's dramatic dialogues of First Fruits, Second Fruits and passages from Montaigne's Essays, doing a comparison with Shakespeare's dialogues and pointing out some similarities between the two writers. Further textual and linguistic analysis was performed by Rinaldo C. Simonini, who compared Florio's dramatic dialogues of First Fruits and Second Fruits with Shakespeare's plays.

== Groom of the Privy Chamber (1604–1619) ==
=== Florio & Queen Anne ===
With the accession of James I, John Florio's life at court begins a new chapter. He became Groom of the Privy Chamber, lived at court, and had a prestigious position at the centre of power. From 1604 to Queen Anne's death in 1619, he had a secure income, and his life was on a steadier course.

Florio's duties and his influence over the Queen at court emerge from various official documents. First, he became a reader in Italian to Queen Anne and one of the grooms of her privy chamber. In a document dated March 1619, there is a list of Queen Anne's "Grooms of the Privy Chamber" with the length of their service and the amounts of their yearly salary. In this, Florio is stated to have served her for fifteen years at a salary of one hundred pounds per annum. This makes 1604 the year in which John Florio began his court service. A groom's salary was sixty pounds per annum. The higher rate in Florio's case seems to have been due to his additional functions as reader in Italian and private secretary to the Queen. He also wrote her letters and interviewed people for her. In addition to his attendance on the Queen, John Florio was also a tutor in Italian and French to Prince Henry at court. In November 1606, Anne of Denmark gave him a valuable cup as a present at the christening of his grandchild, bought from the goldsmith John Williams.

==== Diplomatic affairs ====
Ottaviano Lotti, a representative of the Grand Duke of Tuscany in London, wrote to Florio in August 1606 for help to buy hunting dogs to present to Anne of Denmark, keeping the gift a secret from Jane Drummond, an influential gentlewoman in Anne of Denmark's household. From Lotti's dispatches, we know that John Florio had a major and confidential role with the Queen at court. This throws a flood of light upon Florio's position with the Queen, which turns out to have been much more important than has hitherto been guessed.

Florio was also in close contact with Giovanni Carlo Scaramelli, Secretary to the Signoria; their relationship was important as it determined the political relationship between Venice and London at the time. Other ambassadors Florio got in contact with are Zorzi Giustinian, ambassador of Venice in London from January 1606 to 1608, Nicolò Molin, Henry Wotton, and many others. This diplomatic partnership between London and Venice, the English and Venetian agents and ambassadors, had John Florio as the crucial link between the two worlds.

==== Ben Jonson ====
Another of Florio's tasks at court was to interview and select musicians, often Italian ones, who were seeking an introduction at court. Ottaviano Lotti, for example, in 1606 asked Florio to assist with his influence on a musician who wished to obtain employment at court. They arranged a supper-party with the idea of inducing Florio to introduce the musician and his lyre at court. This shows not only another accomplishment Florio added in his career, but also another talent: his musical competence. The importance and influence which Florio's established reputation and his court position gave him are illustrated by the fact that books were now dedicated to him. These dedications reveal that he had some association during these years with Nicholas Breton, Ben Jonson, and Thomas Thorpe. John Florio's friendship with Ben Jonson is of great interest and importance. It is well-attested by an inscription written in Ben's own hand upon the fly-leaf of a copy of Volpone which is now in the British Museum: "To his louing Father, & worthy Freind, Mr John Florio: The ayde of his Muses. Ben: Jonson seales this testemony of Freindship, & Loue." The word "Father" which the dramatist uses in addressing his friend, suggests not only the disparity in their ages. It most importantly implies some suggestion of discipleship, with a more striking tribute by speaking of him as "The ayde of his Muses".

==== Thomas Thorpe ====
Thomas Thorpe, in 1610, published a translation from Epictetus his Manuall. He dedicated this work to Florio, reminding him that he had procured a patron for an earlier work of John Healey's His apprentises essay, and hoping that he would do the same by this one. In the three existing dedications by Thorpe, other than that to W. H., the first is addressed to Florio, the two others to the Earl of Pembroke, while the other, some years before, is addressed to the editor, Edward Blount.

We thus have Thorpe's evidence that Florio procured him the Pembroke's patronage. He also did the same for John Healey. Florio secured the patronage of William Herbert, 3rd Earl of Pembroke, for Healey's The Discovery of a New World. This work was an extremely free and humorous version of the "Latin Mundus Alter ed Idem", a satire of England. Moreover, in 1609, John Florio gave to Thomas Thorpe his translation of Healey's Discovery of a New World.

== Montaigne's Essays (1603) ==
Florio's translation of Michel de Montaigne's Essays was licensed for publication to Edward Blount on 4 June 1600, and eventually published three years later, in 1603. Florio's translation of the Essays came to be highly regarded as a literary art during the Elizabethan period. It was dedicated to six ladies of the court. The first book is for the Countess of Bedford and her mother. The second is divided between Lady Penelope Rich, Sidney's Stella, and his daughter, Elizabeth, Countess of Rutland. He also adds an appropriate eulogy of the 'perfect-unperfect' Arcadia. The third is given gracefully to two of Florio's younger pupils. They are Lady Elizabeth Grey, daughter of the Earl of Shrewsbury, and Lady Mary Nevill, daughter of England's Lord High Treasurer.

In the letter addressed to the courteous reader, Florio champions translation as the most useful route for advancing knowledge and developing the language and culture of a nation. Again, here he connects this important issue with the recent army of opponents connected with the medievalism still firmly entrenched at the universities that were the most important sources of opposition. In his defence of translation, John Florio explained that there are many likely French words in his translation of Montaigne's Essays that, by being coupled with common words to explain them, may be "familiar with our English, which well may beare them." He cites a number of such words he created, which he says some critics may object to: "entraine, conscientious, endeare, tarnish, comporte, efface, facilitate, ammusing, debauching, regret, effort, emotion."

In the pages "Of the Caniballes" he borrows French words which were already in circulation but of late introduction and of restricted use. Some examples are febricitant, supplant, puissant. And at least one which appeared in an English text for the very first time: contexture; this was a key word for Montaigne, which was used later by Bacon. Florio consciously experimented with English, grafting into it words and phrases from other languages. This led him to construct many new words and grammatical constructions. For example, he was one of the first writers to use the genitive neuter pronoun "its".

John Florio invented a variety of compounds through the use of doubling, transforming "l'ame plaine" into "a mind full-fraught" and "doux & aggreable" into "pleasing-sweet". The note of the sonnet cycles is caught in "Pride-puft majestie" and "the fresh-bleeding memorie". Another is "with hight-swelling and heaven-disimbowelling words." Florio frequently made such an alteration for the sake of a fuller picture. According to Francis Otto Mattiessen, Florio's habit of seeing and saying things dramatically is one of his most distinctive qualities. In Shakespeare's Montaigne, historian Stephen Greenblatt observed that "to read Montaigne's Essays in Florio's translation is to read them, as it were, over the shoulders of some of England's greatest writers."

== Queen Anna's New World of Words (1611) ==
Florio's magnum opus as lexicographer was his augmented dictionary, Queen Anna's New World of Words, or Dictionarie of the Italian and English tongues (London 1611), embracing nearly 74,000 definitions. Not only was the volume almost twice larger than its predecessor, containing about 75,000 definitions, but in preparing it he had consulted 249 books, of which one-fifth appeared on the Index of prohibited books as against 72 listed in the World of Words, most belonging to the 17th century. These figures may be compared with the first edition of the Florentine Vocabolario della Crusca, published in 1612, which lists 230 works as sources for its material.

The sources consulted by John Florio are listed in the work and include books on all phases of general and specialised knowledge. The definitions are so fully treated that, for the most part, the work is not only a dictionary but is also an encyclopedia of general knowledge of the time.

One of the most interesting features of the book list is the high percentage of dramatic works which it contains. Vincenzo Spampanato has classified these as three tragedies (one of these, the Rosmunda of Rucellai, was one of the earliest modern regular tragedies), two tragi-comedies, Guarini's Pastor Fido, and Celestina translated from the Spanish, five pastorals, among them being Aminta. The largest class are comedies, including Terence translated by Fabrini, Machiavelli's Clizia, and many other comedies of the Intronati di Siena. In fact, approximately one-sixth of all the sources cited by Florio are now comedies, tragedies and pastorals by such authors as Giovanni Battista Giraldi Cinthio, Matteo Bandello, Giovanni Boccaccio, Pietro Aretino, Machiavelli, Fiorentino, Ariosto, Sannazzaro, Tasso, and many old Italian Commedia dell'arte's authors, for a total number of 39 plays.

In his search for words, Florio had also studied in Italian translations classical authors such as Tacitus, Cicero, Plato, Plutarch, Ovid, and Pliny. Besides this wide reading in all subjects, a close acquaintance with purely literary masterpieces is demanded of a lexicographer. The list shows that Dante had been studied with the aid of four commentators, Vellutello, Daniello, Boccaccio and Landino. Florio must have possessed a detailed knowledge of Dante, which was unusual for the period.

== Later years ==
=== Second marriage ===
In 1617, at the age of 65, Florio married Rose Spicer, his second wife. She nursed him through his last years, and in his will, he refers to her in terms of tender affection. The period as Groom of the Privy Chamber and Personal Secretary to the Queen was, for Florio, happy years. Anne had promised him a pension of £100 a year until death. But as King James' financial position worsened, these Court pensions were never paid. Many loyal old courtiers were abandoned to poverty in the last years of his reign. Despite not being as wealthy as he was before, Florio remained attached to all the things that once belonged to the Queen. Even after her death, he never sold them. Florio, in fact, still possessed her presents when he made his will, including her writing desk set with pearls and fitted with silver ink wells and a sand box.

=== Boccaccio's Decameron ===
In 1620 Florio published the translation of Boccaccio's Decameron anonymously. His translation omits the Proemio and Conclusione dell'autore, while replacing Tale III.x with an innocuous story taken from Francois de Belleforest's Histoires tragiques, concluding that it "was commended by all the company...because it was free from all folly and obscoeneness." Tale IX.x is also modified, while Tale V.x loses its homosexual innuendo.

=== Will and library ===
In 1623, two years before his death, at 70 years old, John Florio made his last will. He bequeathed his library to William Herbert, Earl of Pembroke. He also gave him "an unbound volume of divers written collections and rapsodies", asking him to place his books in his library "eyther at Wilton or els at Baynards Castle at London." His books never reached Wilton House or Baynard's Castle at London as requested. For unknown reasons, the executors named in the will renounced execution. Florio's library has since disappeared. In his will, John Florio mentioned "about" 340 books, most of them Italian, but also French, Spanish and English. Over the centuries, some Florio scholars have attempted the impossible task of locating parts of his library. Arundel Del Re, in his book about John Florio and First Fruits admitted he found only one book that belonged to Florio's library. This is the Imprese by Paolo Giovio, and bears Florio's signature: the book is now held in the British Library.

Frances Yates, Florio's biographer, asserted that she once had seen an annotated copy of Chaucer that belonged to John Florio. In 2019, this copy was sold online by Peter Harrington. The cover contains John Florio's handwriting: "J. Florio: Ex dono John Dony." The copy is now in Yale University Library.

Michael Wyatt, in his study "La biblioteca in volgare di John Florio" ("The Vernacular Library of John Florio") identified all the editions of the books used by Florio in compiling his dictionaries.

=== Death and resting place ===
John Florio died in Fulham, London, in about October 1625, a victim of the plague. Anthony Wood suggested that Florio's sepulture was either in the church or in the graveyard of All Saints' Church, Fulham, but so far no stone marks of the resting place has been found and Frances Yates suggested a grimmer alternative: for those victims of the plague, Hurlingham Field was the site of a plague pit and Florio's bones could "lie in the bed of the lake at Hurlingham". Florio's only surviving daughter, Aurelia, married James Molins, a surgeon. Aurelia Florio was a midwife and was one of England's most celebrated midwives in the first part of the seventeenth century.

== Shakespeare authorship theory ==
Florio, and his father, are two of the many individuals who have been proposed as the alternative author of the works of William Shakespeare by advocates of the Shakespeare authorship question. The Florios were probably first mentioned as authorship candidates in 1927.

According to Carla Rossi, the speculations about a Florio participation in Shakespeare's writings are wholly without any foundation in the archives, though the object of intense speculation on the internet.

== Sources ==
- Ives, Eric: Lady Jane Grey: A Tudor Mystery Wiley-Blackwell 2009 ISBN 978-1-4051-9413-6
- Marrapodi, Michele (2007). Italian culture in the drama of Shakespeare & his contemporaries: rewriting, remaking, refashioning. Aldershot, England; Burlington, VT: Ashgate. ISBN 978-1351925853. OCLC 975433, 965772368.
- O'Connor, Desmond (2008) [2004]. "Florio, John (1553–1625)". Oxford Dictionary of National Biography (online ed.). Oxford University Press. doi:10.1093/ref:odnb/9758. (Subscription, Wikipedia Library access or UK public library membership required.)
- Paratico, Angelo (27 February 2014). "An Italian editor corrected Shakespeare's spelling mistakes". Beyond Thirty-Nine. Archived from the original on 24 August 2017.
- Yates, Frances A. (1934). John Florio: The Life of an Italian in Shakespeare's England. Cambridge: Cambridge University Press. OCLC 610362236.
- Rossi, Carla (2018). Italus ore, Anglus pectore: Studi su John Florio [Italian by mouth, English by heart: Studies on John Florio] (in Italian). Vol. 1. London: Thecla Academic Press. ISBN 978-0-244-06477-8. Downloadable from University of Zurich: "Italus ore, Anglus pectore" (PDF). Thecla Academic Press. 2018. Archived (PDF) from the original on 23 February 2024.
