= Aurélie =

- Gender: Female
- Language: French

Other gender
- Masculine: Aurèle, Aurélien

Origin
- Language: Latin
- Origin: aureus
- Meaning: "golden"

Other names
- Related names: Aurelle, Aurelie, Aurelia, Ariel, Aureliane

Aurélie (or its variants Aurelie or Aurelia) is a feminine name primarily occurring in France, deriving from the Latin Aurelius (golden) family. The masculine forms are Aurèle and Aurélien. The name was historically popular in France, and is currently seeing a resurgence across Europe.

The name is sometimes also given outside of France, especially in Mediterranean countries and the Netherlands. In some cases, the accent aigu on the first e is dropped (Aurelie), and occasionally the final e is replaced with an a (Aurelia), especially in Italy and Romania. Common nicknames include Rory, Arie, and Aurie.

People with the given name include:

- Aurélie Amblard, 21st century French actress
- Aurélie Bailon (born 1987), French rugby union player
- Aurélie Chaboudez (born 1993), French runner
- Aurélie Claudel (born 1980), French model
- Aurélie Dupont (born 1973), French ballet dancer
- Aurélie Filippetti (born 1973), member of the National Assembly of France
- Aurélie Froment (born 1987), French boxer
- Aurélie Gagnet (born 1994), French footballer
- Aurélie Groizeleau (born 1989), French rugby union referee and former player
- Aurélie Kaci (born 1989), French footballer
- Aurélie Lévêque (born 2001), French short-track speed skater
- Aurélie Marie Augustine Razafinjato, Malagasy politician
- Aurélie Moisan (born 2005), Canadian snowboarder
- Aurélie Nemours (1910–2005), Parisian painter
- Aurélie Neyret (born 1983), French illustrator and cartoonist
- Aurélie Richard (born 2005), French para-alpine skier
- Aurélie Rivard (born 1996), Canadian swimmer
- Aurelie Sheehan, American novelist and short story writer
- Aurelie Thiele, French engineer
- Aurélie Tran (born 1996), Canadian artistic gymnast
- Aurélie Trouvé (born 1979), French politician

== See also ==
- Aura Lea
