= Julia da Silva Cardoso =

Julia da Silva Cardoso (d. after 1840) also known as Mae Julia and Na Julia ('Senhora Julia'), was a Euro-African nhara slave trader.

She was raised by the Portuguese José da Silva Cardoso of Cap Verde, and may have been his daughter. She married the Portuguese Joaquim Antonio de Matto (d. 1843). She played a dominant role on the business life of the region as a business agent between the Portuguese and the indigenous African population, particularly within the slave trade, and also acted as a political diplomat and mediator between them. She was the foster mother and possible aunt of Aurelia Correia.
