= Aurelia Correia =

West African slave trader

Dona Aurelia Correia (d. circa 1875), also known as Mae Aurelia, Mame Correia Aurelia and Madame Oralia, was a Euro-African nhara slave trader. She was titled "Queen of Orango" by Portuguese and Luso-Africans. Aurelia, a slave trader from West Africa, is believed to have been born from a probable relationship between a trader from Cape Verde and a local woman. She was a dominant key figure in the business life of Guinea-Bissau during the first half of the 19th century. She is regarded as the most famous of the nhara-community of the region, was regarded as an important member of the community by the Portuguese and described as a powerful businesswoman in oral African tradition. She was the fosterchild and possibly maternal niece of Julia da Silva Cardoso, and the de facto wife of the businessman Caetano José Nozolini (1800-1850), Portuguese governor of Cape Verde. On her mother’s side Correia descended from the Bijagó, the ruling matrilineage on the island of Orango, the largest and most important in the archipelago of the Guinea coast.

== Intermediary ==
Correia was good at business and had influence. Both local chiefs and the Portuguese government often asked for her help. She acted as a diplomat and mediator between the Portuguese and the indigenous population, as well as between the Portuguese and the British, and, as such, played an important political role in the region.

== Power Dynamics ==
Both Portuguese and people from the area wanted to feel safe, so they turned to leaders who had power. In Bissau, starting from the late 1820s, important figures like Mãe Aurélia, Caetano Nozolini, and Mãe Julia had a lot of influence. Everyone in the trading community and even the praça commandant recognized their power.

== Shifting Trade Dynamics ==
To provide a broader understanding, the successful replacement of Mattos by Mãe Aurélia and Nozolini signifies a shift from a Portuguese-African connection to a Cape Verdean-African one in Bissau. This shift carried on until around 1450, marking the beginning of the colonial era. Until the 1880s, Cape Verdean and Luso-African traders faced their primary competition not from Portuguese rivals but from French trading interests based in Senegal. Starting from the 1830s, French, Franco-African, and Senegalese traders began to expand their presence into the Bissau trading domain, encompassing the Geba and Grande rivers and the Bissagos archipelago. Their increasing influence is evident through marriage alliances involving the children of Mãe Aurélia, Nozolini, and other Luso-African families in Cacheu, Ziguinchor, and other areas of the Guinea-Bissau region.

== Rise to Power ==
Mãe Aurélia and Nozolini's rise to power can be traced back to the May 1826 uprising of the praça's garrison. In December 1825, Captain Domingos Alves de Abreu Picaluga, a Portuguese army officer new to Guinea, replaced Mattos as the praça commander. When the soldiers revolted in May, Mattos was away from Bissau. The rebels, led by several officers and the chaplain, were quelled with the help of a British warship, but it was Nozolini, commanding a group of sixty Papel grumetes, who played an important role in restoring order. Later on, Picaluga was relieved of his command, and Mattos returned temporarily to stabilize the situation before handing over command in 1827 to another Portuguese officer, Captain Luiz António Bastos. However, neither Bastos nor his successor, naval lieutenant Francisco José Muacho, could apply the same level of authority as Mattos did. It became apparent that during this period, Nozolini and Mãe Aurélia solidified their position as the foremost traders in Bissau. She was the co-manager of the multiple business company Nozolini Jr. & Co.. She was initially a slave trader, and gradually shifted to growing peanuts with slave labour when the West African slave trade started to shrink in the 1830s. She exported peanuts to France via Gorée, introduced peanut cultivation in many parts of Guinea and became the likely biggest peanut-planter in Guinea.

== Trade Network with French Ports ==
Correia managed the factory and supervised the farming of crops such as peanuts, rice, and maize, employing slave labor. The harvested peanuts were exported to Marseille through French ports along the Senegal coast, like Gorée and Saint-Louis. French-owned trading companies played a crucial role in this process, providing farmers with credit and seeds in exchange for their harvested crops.

== Gender Roles in Bijago Economy ==
Rice serves as the main food source in the Bijago economy. While men prepare the fields, women handle the intensive eight-month-long process of cultivating and harvesting. Men focus on tasks like harvesting palm wine and palm oil, fishing, and hunting, although hunting has declined due to decreased game availability. It's suggested that in the past, during periods of male involvement in warfare, women likely played even more significant economic and social roles. As men's contributions from fishing, hunting, and gathering diminished during conflicts, women's role in rice cultivation and other food production became relatively more crucial, especially during shortages when inter-island exchanges and mainland commerce were restricted.

== Expansion and Influence ==
In the mid-1840s, Correia once again expanded the farm in Bolama, making it the largest plantation in the area. Her success attracted other traders from Bissau, who also set up slave factories and peanut farms there. By the late 1850s, British sources referred to her as "Madame Oralia," the owner of a vast estate worked by around three hundred slaves, along with extensive stores. Utilizing her close connections with the Bijagós and other African communities, she settled on the north bank of the Rio Grande inlet, near Bolama, where a peanut farming boom led to a rapid increase in the number of peanut plantations or "pontas" (around forty by the late 1850s), cultivated using slave and contract labor.

Her use of slave labour did cause conflicts between her and the British West Africa Squadron, who raded her plantations on Bolama in 1839, and Freetown, who drove her off Bolama in 1860; in the 1850s, she owned a third of all slaves in Guinea. Portuguese documents confirm that from the 16th to the 19th centuries, the Bijago people were known as fierce raiders who traveled widely and were greatly feared. They captured many individuals, who were then sold to European slave traders. We still need to study how much Mattos and Mãe Aurélia's areas of business control match up with the political or social divides within the Bijago community.

== African Wives as Interpreters ==
When Europeans arrived, they didn't understand African traditions, like language. So, African wives became very important to Europeans. They helped by translating languages and cultures and by working together in business. African women made the most of these situations not only for themselves but also for their male relatives. As a result, they began to play a very important role as middlemen in trade and as mediators between African communities and European traders. This role was also carried out by their children of mixed African-European descent, both female and male. By the mid-1850s, the company had gathered more than 430 slaves, nearly one-third of all the slaves documented in Bissau in 1856. However, the company started to decline gradually and eventually fell apart in the 1860s due to debts and disagreements over inheritances among the various members of the Correia and Nozolini trading families. By this time, the transatlantic slave trade from the Guinea coast had nearly stopped.

== Legacy of Aurélia Correia ==
French trading companies had mostly taken control of the peanut trade in Senegambia. Aurélia Correia likely passed away around the mid-1870s. Even after her death, she became a symbol, especially in Portuguese accounts, for preserving a Portuguese presence in an area desired by both French and British interests. She also maintained a local reputation as a very successful mixed-race trader, a reputation that continues to be remembered in local stories today.

== See also ==
- Efunroye Tinubu
- Fenda Lawrence
- Signare
