= Aurelia Tizón de Perón =

Argentine educator (1902–1938)

Aurelia Perón
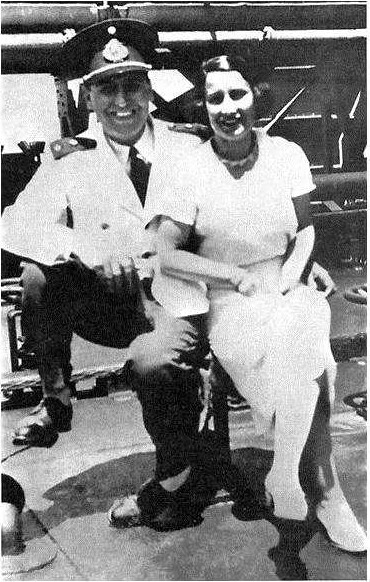
- Aurelia and Juan Perón in the early years of their marriage in the 1930s
- Born: Aurelia Gabriela Tizón; 18 March 1902; Buenos Aires, Argentina
- Died: 10 September 1938 (aged 36); Buenos Aires, Argentina
- Occupation: Educator
- Spouse: Juan Perón (m. 1929)

Aurelia Gabriela Tizón de Perón (18 March 1902 – 10 September 1938) was an Argentine educator and the first wife of former Argentine president Juan Perón.

== Biography ==
Aurelia Gabriela Tizón was born in Buenos Aires either in 1902 or, as some sources place it, in 1908. She was the daughter of Tomasa Erostarbe and Cipriano Tizón, a photographer and owner of a photography shop. She met Juan Domingo Perón in 1925, during the years of his military career; she was working as a teacher at the time. They became a couple, and Perón affectionately called her "Potota", a childish play on preciosa, meaning "precious".

Perón and Tizón married in a private ceremony on January 5, 1929, and they honeymooned in Bariloche. She continued her work as teacher, including at Escuela No. 2 "República de Honduras." Tizón was a woman of many talents. She drew, painted, and played piano and guitar. She could also read English and translated texts between English and Spanish. The couple had no children, although it is reported that they were planning on adopting a child.

After 13 years together, Tizón died of uterine cancer in 1938. She was only 36 years old. She was buried in a niche at the Chacarita cemetery in Buenos Aires, but after Perón wed his second wife, Eva Duarte, her family had her remains transferred to the El Salvador Cemetery in Rosario, Argentina. Later in his life, during his many years as president of Argentina, Perón rarely mentioned his first marriage, as his second and third wives, Eva and Isabel, loomed larger. Tizón is generally lesser-known among Argentines, in part because during the years of their marriage Perón was not yet a national figure.
