= Aurèle =

Aurèle is a given name. Notable people with the name include:

- Aurèle Audet (1920–2015), member of the National Assembly of Quebec
- Aurèle Cardinal, Quebec architect, urban planner, and academic
- Aurèle Chartrand (1903–1975), Ontario barrister and political figure
- Aurèle Gervais (1933–2021), Canadian politician
- Aurèle Joliat (1901–1986), Canadian professional ice hockey left winger
- Aurèle Lacombe (1887–1963), member of the National Assembly of Quebec
- Aurèle Nicolet (1926–2016), Swiss flautist
- Aurèle Vandendriessche (1932–2023), Belgian marathon runner
- Joseph-Aurèle Plourde (1915–2013), the Canadian Archbishop Emeritus of Ottawa
- Juste-Aurèle Meissonnier (1695–1750), French goldsmith, sculptor, painter, architect, and furniture designer
- Marc-Aurèle de Foy Suzor-Coté (1869–1937), Canadian painter and sculptor
- Marc-Aurèle Fortin (1888–1970), Québécois painter
- Pierre-Aurèle Asselin (1881–1964), French Canadian furrier and tenor singer

== See also ==
- Marc-Aurèle-Fortin (electoral district), federal electoral district in Quebec, Canada
- Aurelius
