= Louis Aragon =

French poet (1897–1982)

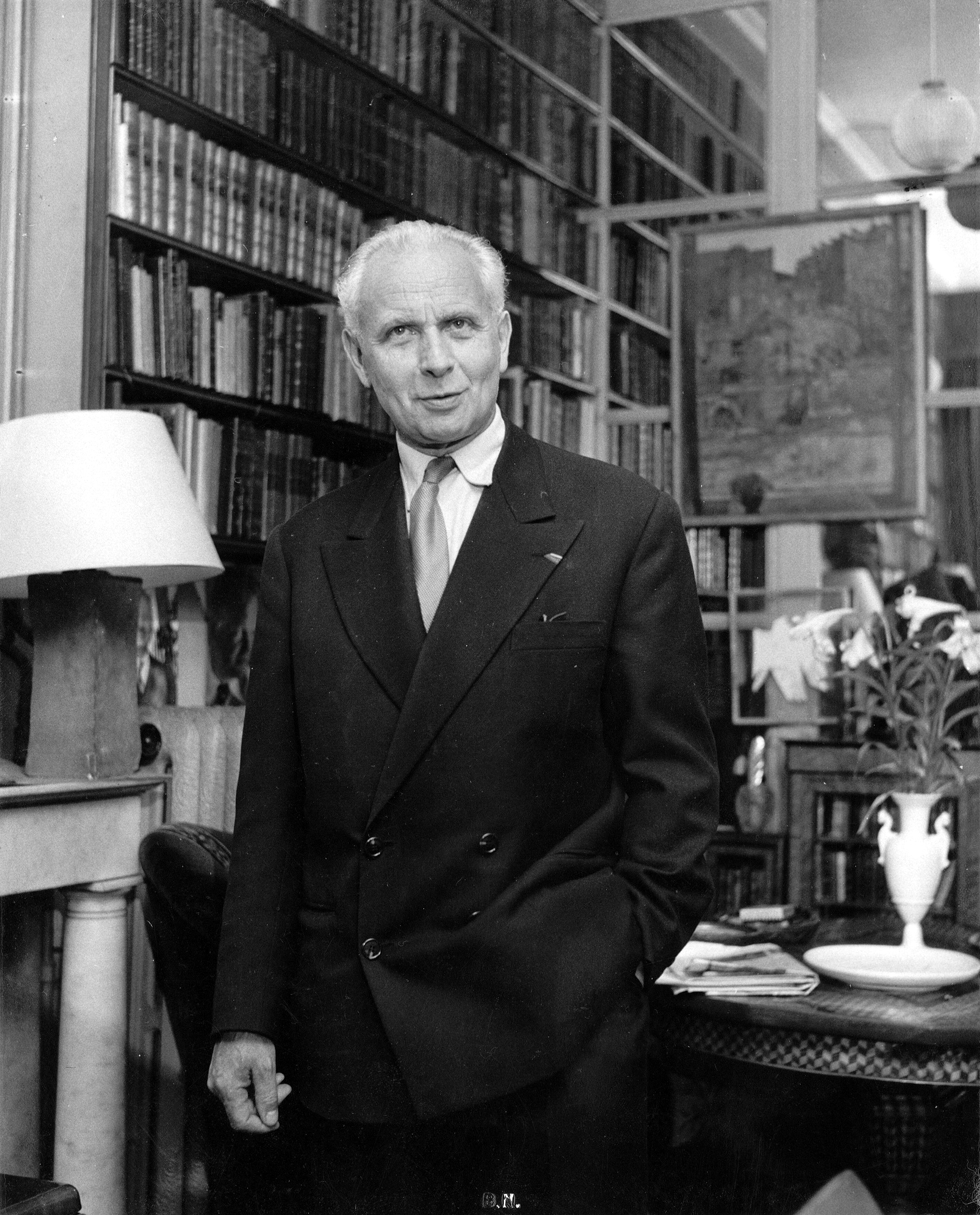
- Portrait of Aragon, before 1982
- Born: 3 October 1897; Paris, France
- Died: 24 December 1982 (aged 85); Paris, France
- Resting place: Saint-Arnoult-en-Yvelines
- Writing career
- Notable works: Les Lettres françaises, Pour un réalisme socialiste

Louis Aragon (French: [lwi aʁaɡɔ̃]; 3 October 1897 – 24 December 1982) was a French poet who was one of the leading voices of the surrealist movement in France. He co-founded with André Breton and Philippe Soupault the surrealist review Littérature. He was also a novelist and editor, a long-time member of the Communist Party and a member of the Académie Goncourt. After 1959, he was a frequent nominee for the Nobel Prize in Literature.

== Early life (1897–1939) ==
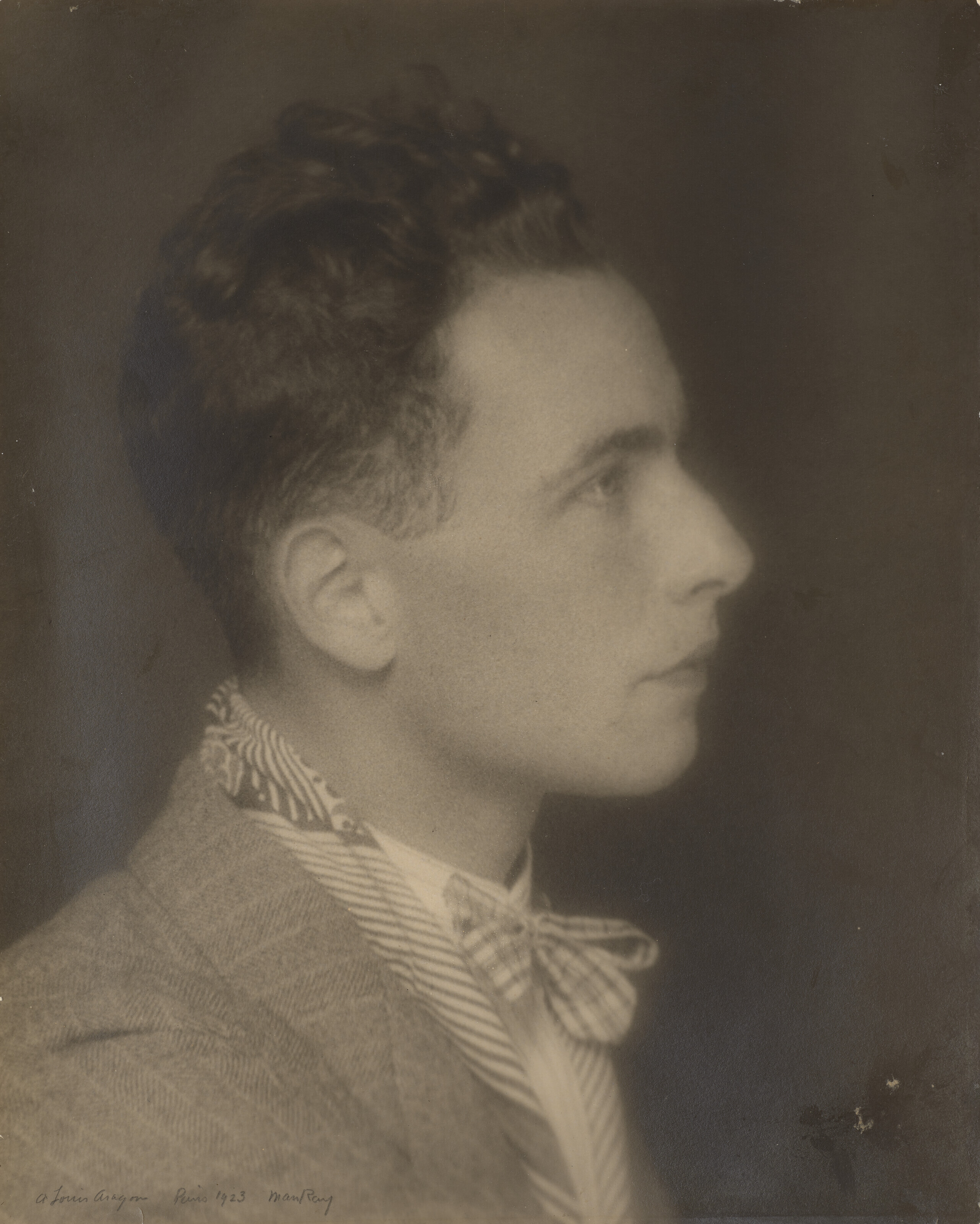
Portrait of Louis Aragon by Man Ray, half-tone print.

Louis Aragon was born in Paris. He was raised by his mother and maternal grandmother, believing them to be his sister and foster mother, respectively. His biological father, Louis Andrieux, a former senator for Forcalquier, was married and thirty years older than Aragon's mother, whom he seduced when she was seventeen. Aragon's mother passed Andrieux off to her son as his godfather. Aragon was only told the truth at the age of 19, as he was leaving to serve in the First World War, from which neither he nor his parents believed he would return. Andrieux's refusal or inability to recognize his son would influence Aragon's poetry later on.

Having been involved in Dadaism from 1919 to 1924, he became a founding member of Surrealism in 1924, with André Breton and Philippe Soupault, under the pen-name "Aragon". In 1923, during the trial of Germaine Berton, Aragon released a 29 portrait piece in La Révolution surréaliste in support of her, stating Berton "use[d] terrorist means, in particular murder, to safeguard, at the risk of losing everything, what seems to her — rightly or wrongly — precious beyond anything in the world".

In the 1920s, Aragon became a fellow traveller of the French Communist Party (PCF) along with several other surrealists, and joined the Party in January 1927.

In 1933, he began to write for the party's newspaper, L'Humanité, in the "news in brief" section. He would remain a member for the rest of his life, writing several political poems including one to Maurice Thorez, the general secretary of the PCF. During the First International Congress of Writers for the Defence of Culture (1935), Aragon opposed his former friend André Breton, who wanted to use the opportunity as a tribune to defend the writer Victor Serge, associated with Leon Trotsky's Left Opposition.

Aragon was also critical of the USSR, particularly after the 20th Congress of the Communist Party of the Soviet Union (1956) during which Joseph Stalin's personality cult was denounced by Nikita Khrushchev.

The French surrealists had long claimed Lewis Carroll as one of their own, and Aragon published his translation of The Hunting of the Snark in 1929, "shortly before he completed his transition from Snarxism to Marxism", as Martin Gardner puts it. Witness the key stanza of the poem in Aragon's translation:

Ils le traquèrent avec des gobelets ils le traquèrent avec soin

Ils le poursuivirent avec des fourches et de l'espoir
Ils menacèrent sa vie avec une action de chemin de fer

Ils le charmèrent avec des sourires et du savon

Gardner, who calls the translation "pedestrian" and deems the rest of Aragon's writings on Carroll's nonsense poetry full of factual errors, says that there is no evidence that Aragon intended any of it as a joke.

=== The Commune (1933–1939) ===
Apart from working as a journalist for L'Humanité, Louis Aragon also became, along with Paul Nizan, editor secretary of the journal Commune, published by the Association des Écrivains et Artistes Révolutionnaires (Association of Revolutionary Writers and Artists), which aimed at gathering intellectuals and artists in a common front against fascism. Aragon became a member of the directing committee of the Commune journal in January 1937, along with André Gide, Romain Rolland and Paul Vaillant-Couturier. The journal then took the name of "French literary review for the defence of culture" (« revue littéraire française pour la défense de la culture »).

With Gide's withdrawal in August 1937, Vaillant-Couturier's death in the autumn of 1937 and Romain Rolland's old age, Aragon became its effective director. In December 1938, he called as chief editor the young writer Jacques Decour. The Commune journal was strongly involved in the mobilization of French intellectuals in favour of the Spanish Republic.

=== Director of Ce soir (1937–1953) ===
In March 1937, Aragon was called on by the PCF to head the new evening daily Ce soir, which he was charged with launching, along with the writer Jean-Richard Bloch. Ce soir attempted to compete with Paris-soir. Outlawed in August 1939, Ce soir was re-opened after the Liberation, and Aragon again became its lead, first with Bloch then alone after Bloch's death in 1947. The newspaper, which counted Émile Danoën among its collaborators, closed in March 1953.

== World War II (1939–1945) ==
In 1939, he married Russian-born author Elsa Triolet, the sister of Lilya Brik, a mistress and then partner of Russian poet Vladimir Mayakovsky. He had met her in 1928, and she became his muse starting in the 1940s. Aragon and Triolet collaborated in the left-wing French media before and during World War II, going underground for most of the German occupation.

Aragon was mobilized in 1939, and awarded the Croix de Guerre (War Cross) and the military medal for acts of bravery. After the May 1940 defeat, he took refuge in the southern zone. He was one of several poets, along with René Char, Francis Ponge, Robert Desnos, Paul Éluard, Jean Prévost, Jean-Pierre Rosnay, etc., to join the Resistance, both through literary activities and as an actual organizer of Resistance acts.

Otto Abetz was the German governor, and produced a series of "black lists" of authors forbidden to be read, circulated or sold in Nazi Occupied France. These included anything written by a Jew, a communist, an Anglo-Saxon or anyone else who was anti-Germanic or anti-fascist. Aragon and André Malraux were both on these "Otto Lists" of forbidden authors.

During the war, Aragon wrote for the underground press Les Éditions de Minuit and was a member of the National Front Resistance movement. His poetry was published alongside texts by Vercors (Jean Bruller), Pierre Seghers or Paul Éluard in Switzerland in 1943 after being smuggled out of occupied France by his friend and publisher François Lachenal.

He participated with his wife in the setting up of the National Front of Writers in the southern zone. This activism led him to break his friendly relationship with Pierre Drieu La Rochelle, who had chosen collaborationism.

Along with Paul Éluard, Pierre Seghers and René Char, Aragon would maintain the memory of the Resistance in his post-war poems. He thus wrote, in 1954, Strophes pour se souvenir in commemoration of the role of foreigners in the Resistance, which celebrated the Francs-Tireurs et Partisans de la Main d'Oeuvre Immigrée (FTP-MOI).

The theme of the poem was the Red Poster affair, mainly the last letter that Missak Manouchian, an Armenian-French poet and Resistant, wrote to his wife Mélinée before his execution on 21 February 1944. This poem was then set to music by Léo Ferré.

== After the war ==
At the liberation of France, Aragon became one of the leading Communist intellectuals, assuming political responsibilities in the Comité national des écrivains (National Committee of Writers). He celebrated the role of the general secretary of the PCF, Maurice Thorez, and defended the Kominform's condemnation of the Titoist regime in Yugoslavia.

Sponsored by Thorez, Aragon was elected, in 1950, to the central committee of the PCF. His post, however, did not protect him from all forms of criticism. Thus, when his journal Les Lettres françaises published a drawing by Pablo Picasso on the occasion of Stalin's death in March 1953, Aragon was forced to make excuses to his critics, who judged the drawing iconoclastic. Through the years, he had been kept informed of Stalinist repression by his Russian-born wife, and so his political line evolved.

=== Les Lettres françaises (1953–1972) ===
In the days following the disappearance of Ce soir, in March 1953, Aragon became the director of L'Humanité's literary supplement, Les Lettres françaises. After Khrushchev's "Secret Speech" about Stalin delivered in 1956, Aragon suffered a deep personal crisis, but it was not until the 1960s when he started openly criticizing the Soviet regime. In 1956, Aragon didn't support the Hungarian Revolution, provoking the dissolution of the Comité national des écrivains, which Vercors quit, and was granted the Lenin Peace Prize, but later he condemned Soviet totalitarianism and authoritarianism, opened his magazines to dissidents, and condemned show trials against intellectuals (in particular the 1966 Sinyavsky–Daniel trial).

Assisted by Pierre Daix, Aragon started in the 1960s a struggle against Soviet policies and its consequences in Eastern Europe. He published the writings of dissidents such as Aleksandr Solzhenitsyn or Milan Kundera. He strongly supported the student movement of May 68, although the PCF was sceptical about it. The crushing of the Prague Spring in 1968 led him to a critical preface published in a translation of one of Milan Kundera's books (La Plaisanterie). In 1970, he supported the Nobel Prize awarded to Solzhenitsyn. Despite his criticisms, Aragon remained an official member of the PCF's central committee until his death. The monetary loss caused by Les Lettres françaises led to its ceasing publication in 1972. It was later re-founded.

=== The publisher ===
Beside his journalistic activities, Louis Aragon was also CEO of the Editeurs français réunis (EFR) publishing house, heir of two publishing houses founded by the Resistance, La Bibliothèque française and Hier et Aujourd'hui. He directed the EFR along with Madeleine Braun, and in the 1950s published French and Soviet writers commonly related to the "Socialist Realism" current. Among other works, the EFR published André Stil's Premier choc, which owed to the future Goncourt Academician the Stalin Prize in 1953. They also published other writers, such as Julius Fučík, Vítězslav Nezval, Rafael Alberti, Yiannis Ritsos and Vladimir Mayakovsky.

At the beginning of the 1960s, the EFR brought to public knowledge the works of non-Russian Soviet writers, such as Chinghiz Aitmatov, or Russian writers belonging to the Khrushchev Thaw, such as Galina Nikolaeva, Yevgeny Yevtushenko's Babi Iar in 1967, etc. The EFR also published the first novel of Christa Wolf in 1964, and launched the poetic collection Petite sirène, which collected works by Pablo Neruda, Eugène Guillevic, Nicolás Guillén, but also less known poets such as Dominique Grandmont, Alain Lance or Jean Ristat.

=== Return to surrealism and death ===
Free from both his marital and editorial responsibilities (having ended publication of Les Lettres Françaises – L'Humanité's literary supplement – in 1972), Aragon was free to return to his surrealist roots. During the last ten years of his life, he published at least two further novels: Henri Matisse Roman and Les Adieux.

Aragon died on 24 December 1982, his friend Jean Ristat sitting up with him. He was buried in the garden of Moulin de Villeneuve, in his property of Saint-Arnoult-en-Yvelines, alongside his wife Elsa Triolet.

He was and still is a popular poet in France because many of his poems have been set to music and sung by various composers and singers: Lino Léonardi, Hélène Martin, Léo Ferré (the first one to dedicate an entire LP to Aragon, with his 1961 breakthrough Les Chansons d'Aragon album), Jean Ferrat, Georges Brassens, Alain Barrière, Isabelle Aubret, Nicole Rieu, Monique Morelli, Marc Ogeret, Marjo Tal, et al. Many of his poems set to music by Jean Ferrat have been translated into German by Didier Caesar (alias Dieter Kaiser) and are sung by his Duo.

== Bibliography ==
=== Novels and short stories ===
- Anicet ou le Panorama, roman (1921)
- Les Aventures de Télémaque (1922)
- Le Libertinage (1924)
- Le Paysan de Paris (1926)
- Le Con d'Irène (1927, published under the pseudonym Albert de Routisie)
- Les Cloches de Bâle ("Le Monde réel", 1934)
- Les Beaux Quartiers ("Le Monde réel", 1936, Renaudot Prize winner)
- Les Voyageurs de l'Impériale ("Le Monde réel", 1942)
- Aurélien ("Le Monde réel", 1944)
- Servitude et Grandeur des Français. Scènes des années terribles (1945)
- Les Communistes (6 volumes, 1949–1951 et 1966–1967 – "Le Monde réel")
- La Semaine Sainte (1958) (published in English in 1959 as Holy Week)
- Le Fou d'Elsa (1963)
- La Mise à mort (1965)
- Blanche ou l'oubli (1967)
- Henri Matisse, roman (1971)
- Théâtre/Roman (1974)
- Le Mentir-vrai (1980)
- La Défense de l'infini (1986)
- Les Aventures de Jean-Foutre La Bite (1986)

=== Poetry ===
- Le Musée Grévin, published under the pseudonym François la Colère by the Editions de Minuit
- La Rose et le réséda
- Feu de joie, 1919
- Le Mouvement perpétuel, 1926
- La Grande Gaîté, 1929
- Persécuté persécuteur, 1930–1931
- Hourra l'Oural, 1934
- Le Crève-Cœur, 1941
- Cantique à Elsa, 1942
- Les Yeux d'Elsa, 1942
- Brocéliande, 1942
- Le Musée Grevin, 1943
- Complainte de Robert le Diable, 1945
- La Diane française, 1945
- En étrange pays dans mon pays lui-même, 1945
- Le Nouveau Crève-Cœur, 1948
- Le Roman inachevé, 1956
- Elsa, 1959
- Les Poètes, 1960
- Le Fou d'Elsa, 1963
- Il ne m'est Paris que d'Elsa, 1964
- Les Chambres, poème du temps qui ne passe pas, 1969
- Demeure de Malkine, 1970

=== Essays ===
- Une vague de rêves, 1924
- Treatise on Style, 1928 (French: Traité du style)
- Pour un réalisme socialiste, 1935

== See also ==
- Le Monde's 100 Books of the Century, a list which includes Aurélien
