= Aranka Goijert =

Dutch politician (1941–2022)

Member of the Senate of the Netherlands
- In office 12 June 2007 – 7 June 2011

Member of the Provincial Council of North Holland
- In office 1991–2002

Personal details
- Born: Aranka Adriana Erzsébet Goijert; 10 April 1941 Amsterdam, Reichskommissariat Niederlande, Germany
- Died: 4 January 2022 (aged 80)
- Party: CDA

Aranka Adriana Erzsébet Goijert (10 April 1941 – 4 January 2022) was a Dutch politician. A member of the Christian Democratic Appeal, she served in the Provincial Council of North Holland from 1991 to 2002 and in the Senate from 2007 to 2011. She died on 4 January 2022, at the age of 80.
