= Aurelia Molins =

English midwife

- Born: 1578
- Died: 1641 (aged 62–63); London
- Occupation: midwife
- Known for: examining witches
- Spouse: James Molins
- Children: 15
- Parent: John Florio

Aurelia Molins or Aurelia Florio (1582–1641), also known also as Celia, was an English midwife. She is known for examining women accused of witchcraft.

== Family ==
Her father was John Florio and her mother was Anna Soresollo, who died of plague between 1592 and 1593. Her father was a famous lexicographer and language tutor at the court of James I of England. Aurelia Florio was born in 1578. Her siblings included, Annabelle, Anne, Joane who was born in Oxford in 1585 and Edward who was born in 1588. A fifth daughter, Elizabeth, was born in 1589.

She was married before 1603 to the surgeon James Molins. He was apprenticed to William Clowes, surgeon to Elizabeth I, and it is thought that Clowes introduced him to Aurelia.

== Career and achievements ==
Molins was one of England's most celebrated midwives in the first part of the seventeenth century. Her skills showed that she had knowledge of Latin, the language of medical texts, which gave her expertise that very few women had at that time. Also, the parish registers of St Andrew, Holborn, show that her handling of her patients was commemorated by the unusual name Aurelia being bestowed on girls she had delivered, with eleven girls in the parish baptised with this name between 1609 and 1639. Meanwhile, Molins was caring for her own fifteen children who were born between 1605 and 1622.

Molins was entitled to have her own armorial bearings on 22 August 1614. Her husband was awarded his on the following day. Her bearings were "azure, a heliotrope or issuing from a stalk sprouting out two leaves vert, in chief the sun in splendour".

In 1625 her father died and she was by then his only living child. His will discussed his debts but also mentioned a gold ring that he left to his daughter and another diamond ring which was in the possession of Aurelia's husband.

On 2 July 1634 Molins signed an examination that had been made of ten women who were alleged to be witches. The women had been brought from Lancashire to be examined in London. The examination was organised by William Harvey who was sceptical about the idea of witches. The document was also signed by nine other midwives and five surgeons, including her husband. The examiners reported on the women's bodies and found that they had found nothing to support the allegation against the ten women. A later confession revealed that the accusations had been invented by a man and his son.

== Death ==
Molins was living with her son when she died a rich widow in London on 12 July 1641.
