= Aurélien =

1944 novel by Louis Aragon

- First edition
- Author: Louis Aragon
- Language: French
- Publisher: Éditions Gallimard
- Publication date: 1944
- Publication place: France
- Dewey Decimal: 841.914

see also Aurélien (given name), for individuals with the masculine given name.

Aurélien [o.ʁe.ljɛ̃] is a novel by Louis Aragon, the fourth of the Le Monde réel cycle. It was ranked 51st in Le Monde's 100 Books of the Century.

== Plot ==
Aurélien explores the moral quandaries and aesthetic diversions of its titular bourgeois hero. Through the lens of its protagonist, a forty-something who has never quite recovered from his experiences in the First World War, Aragon's novel depicts a forgotten and wayward inter-war generation, devoid of any definite identity. The action unfolds against a backdrop of the famous Roaring Twenties (complete with cameos from Picasso and the Dadaists in Pigalle, mentions of the backlash against Cocteau, and allusions to fashionable outings in the Bois de Boulogne).

Despite the meaningless pursuits that surround him, Aurélien becomes swept up in an all-consuming, tortuous and impossible love for Bérénice, a young woman fresh from the provinces with a husband and a "taste for the extreme" ("le goût de l'absolu"). Their love cannot, however, withstand the pressures of their reality. Bérénice eventually returns to her provincial existence, leaving Aurélien to embrace a life of disaffection and hedonism with renewed vigour. Eighteen years later, they meet again and re-live the impossibility of their lost love.

== Genesis ==
In his 1969 essay Je n'ai jamais appris à écrire ou les Incipit ("I never learned to write, or Incipits"), Aragon describes Aurélien as having stemmed from a single sentence that came to him while he was walking in Nice: "La première fois qu'Aurélien vit Bérénice, il la trouva franchement laide" ("The first time Aurélien saw Bérénice, he found her downright ugly"). This sentence became the incipit of the finished novel.

== Adaptations ==
Aurélien (1978), TV film directed by Michel Favart, screenplay adapted by Michel Favart and Françoise Verny, starring Philippe Nahoun as Aurélien and Françoise Lebrun as Bérénice.

Aurélien (2003), TV film directed by Arnaud Sélignac, screenplay adapted by Éric-Emmanuel Schmitt, starring Olivier Sitruk as Aurélien and Romane Bohringer as Bérénice.
