= Aurelia (crater) =

Crater on Venus

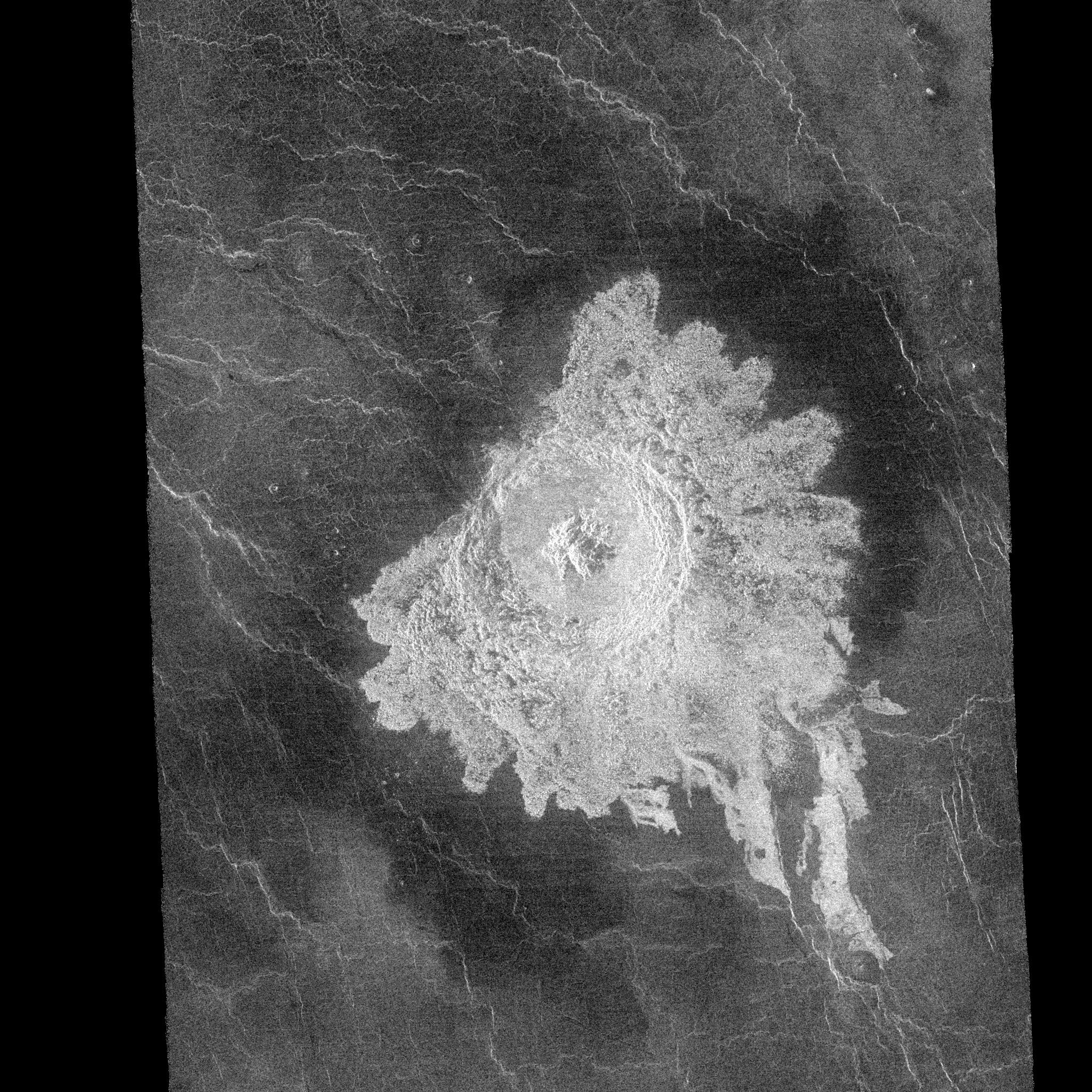
- Location: Venus
- Coordinates: 20.3°N 331.8°E
- Diameter: 31.1 km
- Eponym: Aurelia

Aurelia is a 31.1 km diameter impact crater on the surface of Venus. It has a large dark surface up range from the crater; lobate flows emanating from crater ejecta, and very radar-bright ejecta and floor. Aurelia has a continuous ejecta radius of 24.9 km, and a wall width of 4.4 km.

The crater takes its name from Aurelia, the mother of Julius Caesar. The name was accepted by the IAU in the year 1991.
