= Aurelia Litsner De Fere =

Hungarian musician and teacher

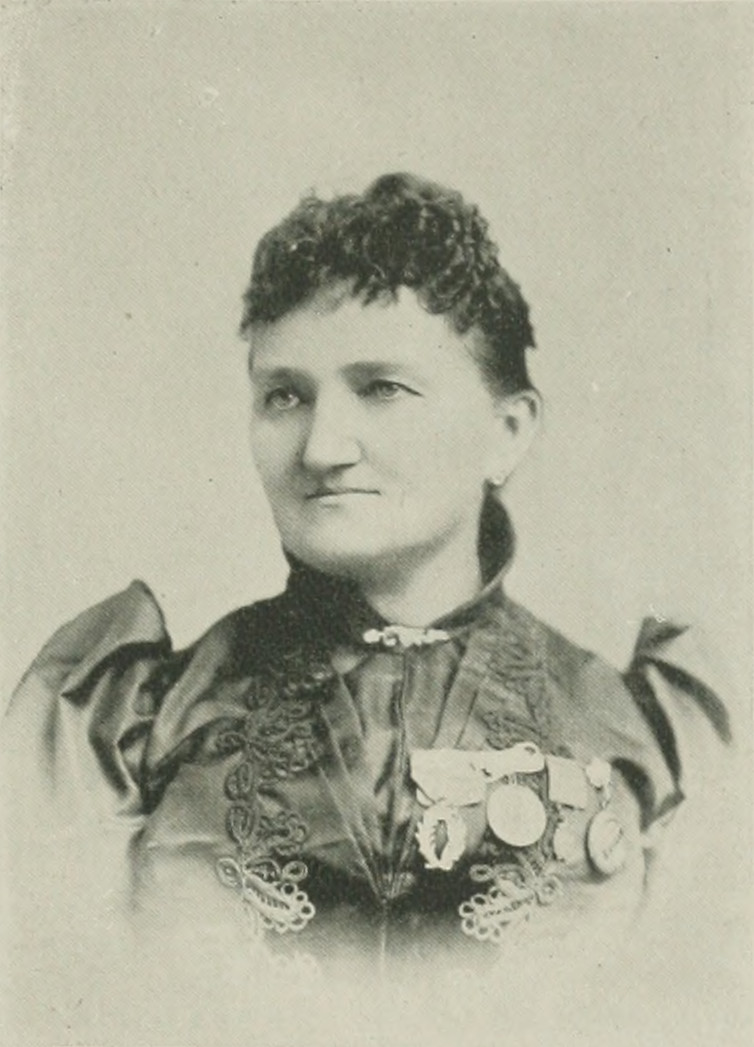
- Born: c. 1835; Hungary
- Died: October 7, 1917; Brooklyn, New York, U.S.
- Occupations: Musician and voice-trainer
- Spouse: Eugene De Fere
- Children: 1

Aurelia Litsner De Fere (c. 1835 – October 7, 1917) was a Hungarian musician and voice-trainer. For many years a teacher of voice, in her youth, De Fére spent a good deal of time as a student in Paris, winning a first prize at the Conservatoire de Paris. In the United States, she opened a conservatory of music in Brooklyn and became prominent in the musical life of that city. She was a recipient of the palm of "Officier d' Academie" in Paris, France, and a gold medal as the best singer by the Académie des Beaux-Arts.

== Early years and education ==
Aurelia Litsner was born in Hungary. She was educated in Germany, and from her earliest youth displayed wonderful aptitude and taste for music and singing. When she was fourteen years old, she appeared in public for the first time, having been chosen to sing a solo part at a festival in Mainz, Germany. The success she achieved on that occasion was such that it was determined that she should pursue a musical career. She presented herself at the customary examination of the National Conservatory of Music, of Paris, and was at once admitted. After four years of study, she won two second prizes for singing and opera, and the next year, she obtained two first prizes also for singing and opera, which were unanimously awarded to her. A gold medal, yearly awarded to the best singer by the Académie des Beaux-Arts, was also bestowed upon her.

== Career ==
Having completed her studies, she was engaged as prima donna in the opera of Paris, Lyon, Marseille and Bordeaux. She sang in Belgium and Germany, and, having returned to her native country, she was received with enthusiasm at the National Opera of Pesth. Later, she sang with great success in the West Indies, and finally went to New York City, where she resolved to devote herself to the instruction of singing.

De Fere made a study of classical music and constantly sought to improve her method, which sought the perfection of the vocal instrument and of the quality of the sound. She settled in New York in 1876 and taught vocal music there until 1883, when she moved to Brooklyn and formed her own conservatory of music. In New York, she taught in the schools of Mrs. Sylvanus Reed, of the Misses Charbonnier, of the Charliers and of Dr. and Mrs. Van Norman.

She combined the French and Italian methods of singing in her system. Her husband, Eugene De Fere, a graduate of the University of Paris, assisted her in the conduct and management of the De Fere Conservatory. She won the palm of "Officier d' Academie " in Paris, France, a distinction enjoyed by only one other woman in the United States at the time, Minnie Hauk.

== Personal life ==
De Fere made her home in Brooklyn. She died at her home on Sunday, October 7, 1917, at the age of eighty-two. She was survived by one son, Paul Eugene De Fere (b. 1868, Paris.
