= Fenda Lawrence =

- Born: circa 1742; Saloum
- Died: After 1780
- Occupation: Slave trader

Fenda Lawrence (1742 – after 1780), was an African slave trader who operated in the Saloum town of Kaur. In 1772, she visited the Thirteen Colonies as a free black woman for both tourism and to trade.

== Biography ==
Fenda Lawrence lived in pre-colonial Gambia near the Gambia River during the mid-18th century. While there, she acted as a go-between for the British and French traders and the local Africans. This was a position afforded to her by marriage to an Englishman. Lawrence worked out of the Saloum town of Kaur. In 1772, Lawrence visited the Thirteen Colonies of America as a tourist with some business interests. By this point, she had already separated from her English partner.

Arriving on the ship New Britannia, Lawrence took five personal slaves with her. It first arrived in Charleston, South Carolina, after 36 days of sailing. Lawrence was then accompanied by the Captain of the vessel, Stephen Deane, to Georgia. She was issued a document from the state proclaiming that she was "a free black woman and heretofore a considerable trader in the River Gambia on the coast of Africa, hath voluntarily came to be and remain for some time in this province". Lawrence would have been a native speaker of Wolof, but in order to trade in Georgia, would have spoken Creole.

Deane requested permission on behalf of Lawrence for her to settle permanently in Georgia. Deane stated that he had known Lawrence for seven or eight years, and stated that specifically James Lawrence, her son, should be allowed to stay. In Robert Davis' article for The Georgia Historical Quarterly, he proposes that Fenda Lawrence was the mother of at least one if not more of Deane's children. He states that Deane's son David Laurence was certainly also the son of Lawrence.

== See also ==
- Signares, female slave traders in colonial West Africa
