= Kalaweit Project =

Project to conserve and protect the gibbons of Indonesia

The Kalaweit project is a pioneer project in the conservation and protection of the gibbons of Indonesia.

== Origin ==
=== Chanee Kalaweit ===
The founder of the project is Aurélien Brulé (better known as "Chanee Kalaweit"), a young Frenchman born in 1979 in Fréjus (Var), in southern France. Kalaweit means "Gibbon" in Dayak Ngaju (language of the natives of Borneo), while "Chanee" also means gibbon, but in Thai.

In the beginning, the project was launched under the name of "Etho-Passion" in 1997, changing its name to "Kalaweit Project" shortly thereafter. Chanee Kalaweit came to Indonesia in 1998, and the Kalaweit Project began operations in 1999, the year in which the first gibbon sanctuary was established following the signing of an initial agreement with the Indonesian government.

In 2004, the association signed a national cooperation agreement with the Indonesian forestry department, permitting Kalaweit to rescue gibbons throughout Indonesia.

"Kalaweit Project" has since become the most important gibbon rehabilitation program in the world. Despite focusing on the recovery of these primates, the project has also played an active role in the recovery of other species such as the Malayan Sun bear (Helarctos malayanus) or the Slender loris.

== Centers of operation ==
The association has two rehabilitation centers, one on Kalimantan and another on Sumatra (with more than 300 Gibbons and Siamangs).

=== Borneo ===
On the Indonesian portion of the island of Borneo there are three facilities:

- Palangka Raya (Central Kalimantan): logistics center and place where Kalaweit FM Radio is issued.
- Pararawen: this is the sanctuary where the animals are located (350 km north of Palangka Raya).
- Hampapak: this is the place where the animals are placed in controlled freedom. It is situated on an island in Lake Hampapak.

=== Sumatra ===
The Sumatran center is located on Marak Island, a tiny uninhabited island of 1,000 hectares, where the gibbons can be prepared for release. It is 5 km off the coast of the island of Sumatra.

== Radio Kalaweit ==
It is the flagship of project. It was created with the aim to sensitize the local population through music and the issuance of conservation messages in the intervals between songs.

It is the title of a documentary by British chain BBC dealing with the project, documentary producers Chanee Kalaweit accompany his daily work.

== The main threats to the gibbon ==
Given its friendly aspect, gibbons are captured as pets, especially when they are still young. Upon reaching sexual maturity, gibbons become violent, which is why they are imprisoned in cages until their death (which usually occurs early). However, the greatest danger represents the destruction of their natural environment (a problem shared with the Orangutan and the rest of the rich Indonesian biodiversity). The destruction of the forest that serves as home is motivated primarily by the action of the timber factories and placement of palm oil plantations.
