= Florian theory of Shakespeare authorship =

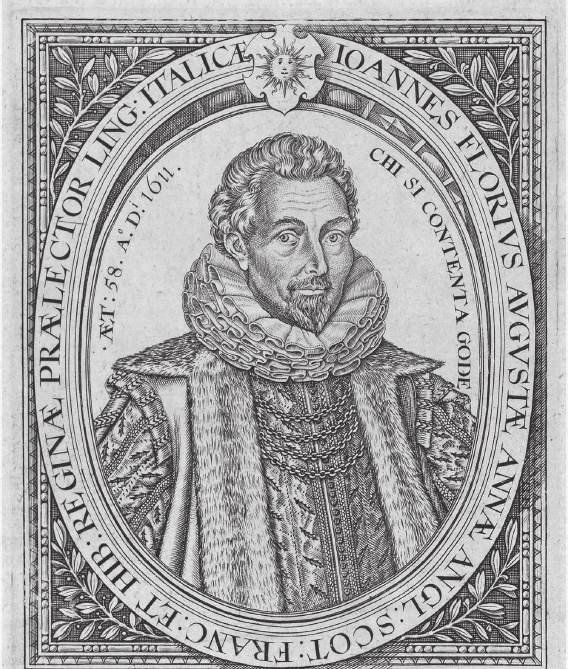
John Florio, engraving by William Hole, 1611

The Florian theory of Shakespeare authorship holds that the Protestant pastor Michelangelo Florio (1515–1566) or his son the English lexicographer John Florio (1552–1625), or both, wrote the plays of William Shakespeare (1564–1616). First thought up in 1927, the idea placed both Florios among the over 80 alternative candidates proposed since mid-19th century as the secret authors of the works of Shakespeare. The intertextual relations between the respective works of John Florio and Shakespeare have been intensely investigated by scholarship but, at the same time, have given rise to 'persistent pseudo-scholarly' attempts. Scores of works of "biographism", proposing different candidates and using similar arguments, have emerged since the mid-19th century to question Shakespeare's authorship, but no one in his own time entertained any doubts that he was the author of his works.

== Early history ==
An early outline of this variant of the Shakespeare authorship question, which has never gained much traction outside Italy, (Note: "... the case that Shakespeare’s works were actually written by Florio is harder to refute than the case for any aristocrat's authorship—but because Florio was not an Englishman, the case for him has never made much headway. Except in Italy, of course, where one Santi Paladino published his Un italiano autore delle opere Shakespeariane to much acclaim in 1955.") was first proposed by Santi Paladino, a Sicilian journalist. According to Shakespearean scholar Frank W. Wadsworth, the idea came to Paladino in 1925 while he brooded over a fortune-teller's prediction that he was destined to startle the world with an "important revelation". Paladino recalled later how one day in his father's library he stumbled across a copy of a book, Second Fruits, that he claimed had been published in 1549 by "Michael Agnolo Florio". (Note: Second Frutes to be gathered of twelve trees, of diverse but delightful tastes to the tongues of Italian and English is a work written by Michelangelo's son John and published in 1591.) In it he found words and phrases that he thought were repeated verbatim in William Shakespeare's works, even though Shakespeare had only begun to publish nearly a half a century later.

In 1927 he ventured to publish this notion in an article entitled "Il grande tragico Shakespeare sarebbe italiano". Entire verses of Hamlet, he claimed, were evidenced in Florio's Second Fruits, and rather than plagiarism, he concluded that this Florio and Shakespeare were one and the same person.

Paladino subsequently expanded on his original article by issuing a small volume, Il grande tragico Shakespeare sarebbe italiano (transl. The great tragedian Shakespeare might be Italian). Michelangelo Florio, he argued, composed the works but kept them secret, until his son, John Florio, crossed paths with the young Shakespeare. His son did the work of translating his father's oeuvre, the English actor became a front for placing them with theatrical companies, and the father pocketed the profits. The son also appropriated some of his father's writings in the process. From the very outset, scholars dismissed Paladino's speculations as pure folklore.

By 1929 Paladino had established an Accademia Shakespeariana in Reggio Calabria which, according to a correspondent for the London Times, engaged in polemics with both the national and foreign press over the issue. (Note: According to Antonio Socci, the name was Accademia nazionale shakespeareana.) The article and book are often contextualized within Italian, or perhaps even Sicilian, nationalism and fascism, (Note: "As an Italian chauvinist, my personal favorite alternative authorship theory is the one propagated during the rise of Italian nationalism in the early twentieth century, in which the plays were said to have been actually written by John Florio, an Italian immigrant to Elizabethan England.") (Note: "... les revendications marquées par le nationalisme, pour ne pas dire le fascisme dans le cas particulier de Paladino".) where the Roman and Italian figures in Shakespeare's works played a minor, but notable, role in the cultural politics of fascism itself. In 1930, apparently concerned with the negative impact Paladino's polemics might have on Italy's relations with England, (Note: Winston Churchill, it is noted, in the capacity of Chancellor of the Exchequer, had met Mussolini a mere month before Paladino had published his article.) at a time when it was trying to secure English support, the fascist government cracked down on Paladino's activities, banning the publication of his work and confiscating his materials.

In 1936 a medium, Luigi Bellotti, said in an interview with La Stampa di Sera that he had been in contact through a séance with the real Shakespeare, during which pieces of parchment materialized consisting of an autobiography of Michele Agnolo Florio/Guglielmo Crollalanza signed William Shakespeare. It was this Bellotti who sent into circulation the idea that there was a link between Florio and Crollalanza. This Guglielmo Crollalanza was said to be born in Sondrio and, orphaned at 19, changed his name to Florio to avoid the Inquisition and then joined relatives in England who had in the meantime changed their name to Shakespeare. Several years later he wrote up the results of his spiritualistic encounters with the real, Italian author in a pamphlet published in Venice in 1943, entitled L’italianità di Shakespeare. Guglielmo Crollalanza grande genio italiano ("The italianness of Shakespeare: Guglielmo Crollalanza great Italian genius").

== Foreign reactions ==
Paladino's 1927 article had an immediate echo abroad when it was picked up by German writer Erik Reger in a review, "Der Italiener Shakespeare" (The Italian Shakespeare), published in the Deutsche Allgemeine Zeitung that same year. Reger identified the 'real' Shakespeare as Michelagnolo Florio.

An English allusion to the controversy was made in 1934, when Frances Yates published her pathfinding book on John Florio. There she briefly dismissed Santi Paladino's remarks as "astonishing", noting that he confuses Michelangelo Florio, whom he assumes is Shakespeare, with his son John. Paladino also asserted, she adds, that Florio the elder had been in Spain, Austria, Athens, the French court and Denmark, without providing any evidence. There might, she allowed, be a grain of truth in some of these claims about his early travels. As to a possible Shakespeare—Florio connection, Yates recognised that Shakespeare had been an attentive reader of the younger Florio and concluded that Shakespeare lived and worked in circles close to the targets of Florio's "angry quill", that Florio sided with Jonson against Shakespeare in the War of the Theatres and that Shakespeare, notwithstanding his deep debts to Florio's translation of Montaigne, may have satirised him partially in the otherwise typical commedia dell'arte figure of the schoolmaster Holofernes in Love's Labour's Lost. (Note: Holofernes' name here has indeed been read as an "imperfect anagram" for John Florio. Carla Rossi dismisses the idea that Shakespeare copied this passage from a book by Florio on textual grounds, arguing the four Latin errors in the text come from James Sandford's Garden of Pleasure, (1573), a translation of Lodovico Guicciardini's Hore di Ricreatione, (1568).)

== Early postwar revival ==
Ernesto Grillo (1877–1946), Stevenson Professor of Italian Language and Literature at Glasgow University from 1925 to 1940, made passing reference to Paladino's idea in a posthumous and updated edition of his 1925 study of Shakespeare's relationship with Italy. A revival of his hypothesis began in Italy when Carlo Villa, a journalist, picked up the thread in 1951 with his Paris is well worth a mass! William Shakespeare & the Valtellina poet Michelagnolo Florio, (Note: The title refers to a common idiom that alludes to a remark attributed to Henry IV of France.) developed further in his Fra Donne e Drammi a decade later (1961). In 1954 some marginal support, again from Germany, came when a Friderico Georgi, identified by Wadsworth as a certain Franz (Maximilian,) Saalbach, in a self-published brochure under the name Erich Gerwien also advocated a Florio theory. This Georgi also claimed that a Florio wrote not only all of Shakespeare, but also, among others, Christopher Marlowe's Dr. Faustus, Thomas Kyd's The Spanish Tragedy, Edmund Spenser's The Faerie Queene, Philip Sidney's An Apology for Poetry and John Lyly's Euphues. (Note: "... Dr. Faustus, der Spanischen Tragödie, der Fairy Queen, der Apology of (sic)Poetry und des Euphues, um nur einige Werke zu nennen.") Paladino himself, in 1955, published a second book on the topic entitled "Un italiano autore delle opere shakespeariane" (An Italian author of the works of Shakespeare.') He too affirmed that Michelangelo Florio, a Calvinist refugee in England and son of Giovanni Florio and Guglielma Crollalanza, had nativized his monicker by making a calque on his mother's name, thus calling himself Guglielmo Crolla-lanza ("William Shake-spear").

In 1979, Guido Scaramellini, a local journalist writing for a provincial newspaper in Sondrio again broached the topic, suggesting that Shakespeare might have been a certain Florio from Valtellina.

== Resuscitation in the 2000s ==
In 2002, Martino Iuvara, a retired high school teacher resident in Ispica, put out a self-published booklet reaffirming the Crollalanza theory, claiming that on Shakespeare's birthday Michel Agnolo Florio was born in Messina to a doctor Giovanni Florio and his wife, a Sicilian noblewoman, Guglielma Crollolanza. The fact that his name is homonymous with John's father's, is explained as due to this Michelangelo Florio being a younger relative of John Florio's father. After being persecuted for his Calvinist beliefs, he took refuge in England and settled with relatives of his wife, a Crollolanza family in Stratford-on-Avon. It is then hypothesized that he must have adopted their name by translating it into English as 'Shake-spear'. This Michelangelo, he went on to assert, wrote a comedy in Sicilian dialect Troppu trafficu pe' nnenti, for which there is no archival evidence, other than the presumption it must have existed entertained by Santi Paladino, who even dated it to 1579, several decades before the first known comedy in Sicilian made its appearance. Relying on Paladino's claims, Iuvara argued it must be lost and buried in some obscure archive. This imaginary text was apparently then translated by one of the Florios into English with, mutatis mutandis, an identical title, i.e., Much Ado About Nothing, a work we know to be Shakespeare's. Andrea Camilleri, author of the Montalbano detective stories, mocked the thesis by translating Shakespeare's actual play back into Sicilian dialect, using the same title invented by Iuvara. According to the archival historian Carla Rossi, a leading authority on the Florios, Iuvara's theories have absolutely no scientific value. (Note: "Le teorie di Iuvara si fondano, in parte, sugli scritti bizzarri e dal valore scientifico assolutamente nullo.")

Iuvara’s reproposal itself was followed up within the decade by several popular divulgations all characterized by a hurried rehashing of the standard authorship suspicions, (Note: (a)Saul Gerevini, William Shakespeare, ovvero John Florio: un fiorentino alla conquista de lmondo, (Pilgrim edizioni Aula 2008); (2) Robert Romani, Irene Bellini,Il segreto di Shakespeare. Chi ha scritto i suoi capolavori? (Mondadori, 2012);(3)Vito Constantini, Shakespeare. Messaggi in codice, Youcanprint, 2015.) but also stirred the interest of Lamberto Tassinari, a retired university teacher of Italian who had taught at the University of Montreal. In his view, no one need have any particular qualifications to write on Shakespeare, and admits he has come up with no new evidence or manuscripts to back his contentions. He eventually came out with a book that endorsed the Florian theory, which he published with a minor Montreal editing house. The book had a very small print run, and was virtually ignored by scholars. A revised English version, appearing the following year, did receive critical attention from a published authority on alternative Shakespeare theories, who, after paraphrasing its contents, dismissed it as not so much an hypothesis as much as an expression of the author's faith in the conspiracy theory he embraces uncritically. (Note: "Tassinari writes, 'Stratfordians are faith-based scholars, they eschew reason: possessing the truth in advance, they must perforce resolve all the incongruences and contradictions over which they stumble through rigid adherence to the myth' …. This is a pretty good description of Tassinari's book. The conspiracy theory it espouses cannot be disproved so it is not really a theory at all; it is a faith.")

Paladino's theory enjoyed another revival in 2016 on the occasion of the 4th centennial celebrations of Shakespeare's death. A veritable boom in speculations about a Florio connection broke out, mainly consisting of self-published materials full of sham biographical reconstructions without any evidential basis. The resurgence of fantasies culminated in a fake news report on an online clone of Sky TG24 that Shakespeare's real birth certificate had been discovered in the archives of Stratford-on-Avon, and testified that he was indeed Michelangelo Florio born on 23 April 1564 in Messina.

== French reflections ==
In 2014 French philosopher Marc Goldschmit, director of the Collège international de philosophie, published a study on marrano culture dealing with his hypothesis about the way converted Jews inflected the Christian sociopolitical cultures of Europe. He found an antecedent to this in Shakespeare, whose The Merchant of Venice, rather than reflecting anti-Semitic attitudes in the manner Shylock was depicted, evinced to the contrary a thorough grasp of Jewish culture. In particular, he concluded, Portia and Bassanio betrayed all of the lineaments of crypto-Jews, in their names and style of argumentation. (Note: Goldschmit took the ancient Roman gentilic name Portia as encoding one of the three possible etymologies of the Spanish word for a pre-modern crypto-Jew, namely "pig".) The author therefore must have had a thorough mastery of sources in Hebrew, such as the Torah and the Talmud. (Note: 'l’auteur du Marchand de Venise, s’est imposée à mon travail comme une nécessité. Tous les travaux des scholars semblaient indiquer que la famille de Shakespeare-de-Stratford était de religion ou de culture catholique, dans un milieu majoritairement protestant. Mais il y avait là à mes yeux quelque chose qui clochait, une anomalie grave, que ne pouvait pas résoudre l’hypothèse d’un Shake-speare catholique. . . Et comment un catholique aurait-il pu non seulement connaître les rites et les gestes religieux des juifs (je donne une esquisse de recension des références de Shake-speare au judaïsme dans L’hypothèse du Marrane), mais d’autre part citer à plusieurs reprises, dans ses pièces, des extraits de la Torah en hébreu ou du Talmud (par exemple dans Comme il vous plaira, II, 7, à propos des sept périodes de la vie humaine)?')

At a conference on Jacques Derrida, an acquaintance of Goldschmit, the French actor and theatrical director Daniel Mesguich, alerted him to the existence of Tassinari's Florio theory, and, for Goldschmit, the bits of mystery of Shakespeare's intimacy with Jewish scriptures all fell into place: qua John Florio, son of a man whose ancestors had been converts from Judaism, Shakespeare must indeed have been a crypto-Jew and fluent in Hebrew. Tipped off to read the discussion of Tassinari's book on a blog run by his philosophical colleague and expert on Louis Aragon, Daniel Bougnoux, he consulted Bougnoux and contacted Tassinari. Within two years, in January 2016, a French version, updated and revised, of Tassinari's book was published, with support from Bougnoux who published his own reflections on Tassinari's topic three weeks later. Goldschmit himself claimed support for the theory by citing Jorge Luis Borges, imagining from a remark of the Argentinian writer that he too was not only an anti-Stratfordian, but had intuited that Shakespeare must have been either Jewish or Italian, since his style was marked by hyperbole rather than typically English understatement. He was, Goldschmit opined, both. (Note: Goldschmit claims Borges was also an anti-Stratfordian and cites him for support. Borges once remarked in a lecture "El libro" (1978) on how eminent writers chosen to exemplify their countries actually exhibit differences that go against the native grain and thus contradict the national image. Thus, neither Goethe nor Cervantes are representative of their countries. Likewise, he took exception to the way England had promoted Shakespeare to play this role: "Shakespeare es—digámoslo así—el menos inglés de los escritores ingleses. Lo típico de Inglaterra es el understatement, es el decir un poco menos de las cosas. En cambio, Shakespeare tendía a la hypérbole en la metáfora, y no nos sorprendería nada que Shakespeare hubiera sido italiano o judío, por ejemplo." (tr. Slightly adjusted: "England has chosen Shakespeare, and Shakespeare—let’s put it this way—is the least English of the English writers. The understatement is what is most typical of England. But Shakespeare tended towards hyperbole in his metaphor, and it would not surprise us at all had Shakespeare been, for example, Italian or Jewish.")

== Critical reactions ==
When the French edition of Tassinari's book came out, Shakespeare scholar François Laroque commented that the book contains nothing new but was old hat, a 'game' going back to Delia Bacon. Pseudo-revelations of this sensationalist type aspire to stir up polemical reactions from practitioners of orthodox scholarship in order to secure their otherwise hackneyed ideas a certain visibility. One should not play into the hands of the pseudo-demystifier (pseudo-démystificateur) of the day. The more informed academics defend Shakespeare, he added, the greater the inadvertent impression is that the 'nasty' establishment of Shakespearean authorities is engaged in a conspiracy to muffle up what a self-styled iconoclastic smasher of their omertà claims he is exposing. (Note: (So there’s no reason for mounting one’s warhorse and riding off to shatter lances (‘spears) against our self-styled smasher of omertà, this denouncer of a conspiracy which, as always, is supposedly fated to defend the interests of the ‘nasty’ Stratfordians. That is patently what the author wants, in the hope of getting a little visibility for a book that contains nothing new, and for which only polemics, which rarely fail to accompany this kind of false exposé, might seem to give some importance.) 'Nulle raison donc d’enfourcher son cheval de bataille pour aller briser des lances (« spears ») contre notre soi-disant briseur d’omertà, dénonciateur d’une conspiration qui, comme toujours, serait destinée à défendre les intérêts des « méchants » Stratfordiens. L’auteur n’attend visiblement que cela en espérant donner ainsi un peu de visibilité à un livre qui n’est pas neuf et auquel seul les polémiques qui manquent rarement d’accompagner ce genre de fausses révélations pourraient paraître donner quelque importance.') (Note: Tassinari would have it that Florio has been 'snubbed by all academics on the planet' (boudé par tous les universitaires de la planète). Goldschmit claims there is 'a global university ecclesiastical order' (un ordre ecclésiastique universitaire mondial) defending an impossible premise, that Shakespeare wrote his works, by building a ramshackle edifice over the void.)

== Sources ==
- Bassi, Shaul (2011). "Gugliemo and Benito: Shakespeare, Nation, and Ethnicity in Fascist Italy". In Neill, Michael; Bradshaw, Graham; Bishop, Tom; Huang, Alexander Cheng-Yuan (eds.). Shakespeare's Italy and Italy's Shakespeare: Place, "Race," Politics. Ashgate Publishing. pp. 199–216. ISBN 978-1-409-43230-2.
- Bassi, Shaul (2016). Shakespeare's Italy and Italy's Shakespeare: Place, "Race," Politics. Palgrave Macmillan. ISBN 978-1-137-50285-8.
- Bate, Jonathan (1998). The Genius of Shakespeare. Oxford University Press. ISBN 978-0-19-512823-9.
- Bougnoux, Daniel (2016). Shakespeare : Le choix du spectre. Les Impressions Nouvelles Editions. ISBN 978-2-874-49314-0.
- Churchill, Reginald Charles (1958). Shakespeare and His Betters: A History and a Criticism of the Attempts Which Have Been Made to Prove That Shakespeare's Works Were Written by Others. London: Max Reinhardt.
- Cook, Hardy M. (2013). "A selected reading list". In Edmondson, Paul; Wells, Stanley (eds.). Shakespeare Beyond Doubt: Evidence, Argument, Controversy. Cambridge University Press. pp. 241–248. ISBN 978-1-107-01759-7.
- Craig, Hardin (April 1928). "Recent Literature of the English Renaissance". Studies in Philology. 25 (2): 178–293. JSTOR 4172001.
- Costola, Sergio; Saenger, Michael (2016). "Shylock's Venice and the Grammar of the Modern City". In Marrapodi, Michele (ed.). Shakespeare and the Italian Renaissance: Appropriation, Transformation, Opposition. Routledge. pp. 147–162. ISBN 978-1-317-05644-7.
- Elam, Keir (2016) [first published 2007]. "'the Cubiculo': Shakespeare's Problems with Italian Language and Culture". In Marrapodi, Michele (ed.). Italian Culture in the Drama of Shakespeare & his Contemporaries. Routledge. pp. 99–110. ISBN 978-1-351-92584-6.
- Falocco, Joe (2004). "Is Mark Twain Dead?: Samuel Clemens and the Question of Shakespearean Authorship". The Mark Twain Annual (2): 25–40. JSTOR 41582186.
- Georgi, Friderico (January 1954). William Shakespeare, Alias Mercutio Florio. Bremen: Privately printed. pp. 1–54.
- Goy-Blanquet, Dominique (10 February 2016). "Shakespeare, combien de prétendants?". En attendant Nadeau.
- Grillo, Ernesto (1949) [1925]. "Shakespeare and Italy". Glasgow University Press.
- Goldschmit, Marc (2014). L'hypothèse du marrane: le théâtre judéo-chrétien de la pensée politique. le Félin. ISBN 978-2-866-45808-9.
- Goldschmit, Marc (January 2016). "Giovanni Florio, sous le masque de Shakespeare". Bulletin des bibliothèques de France. pp. 136–150.
- Iuvara, Martino (2002). Shakespeare era italiano. Edizioni Associazione Triacria.
- Jorgensen, Paul A. (Spring 1955). "Books and Articles Relating to Shakespeare". Shakespeare Quarterly. 6 (2): 208–236. doi:10.1093/sq/6.2.208. eISSN 1538-3555. ISSN 0037-3222. JSTOR 2866416.
- Laroque, François (10 June 2016). "Est-il scandaleux que le fils d'un gantier anglais puisse bel et bien être Shakespeare?". Le Monde.fr. Le Monde.
- McCrea, Scott (Spring 2010). "John Florio: The Man Who Was Shakespeare by Lamberto Tassinari and William McCuaig". Comparative Drama. 44 (1): 88–91. doi:10.1353/cdr.0.0091. JSTOR 23238678. S2CID 191466520.
- Mirolla, Michael (15 December 2008). "Interview with Lamberto Tassinari". Accenti Magazine. No. 15.
- Montini, Donatella (2015). "John Florio and Shakespeare: Life and Language" (PDF). Memoria di Shakespeare. Sapienza University of Rome: 109–129. Archived from the original (PDF) on 2021-06-24.
- Musolino, Francesco (2019). Le incredibili curiosità della Sicilia. Newton Compton Editori. ISBN 978-8-822-73349-8.
- Orsi, Laura (2016). "William Shakespeare e John Florio: una prima analisi comparata linguistico-stilistica". Atti e Memorie dell'Accademia Galileiana di Scienze, Lettere ed Arti già dei Ricovrati e Patavina: 139–280.
- Paladino, Santi (4 February 1927). "Il grande tragico Shakespeare sarebbe italiano". No. 30. L’Impero.
- Paladino, Santi (1929). Shakespeare sarebbe il pseudonimo di un poeta italiano. Reggio Calabria: Borgia.
- Paladino, Santi (1955). Un italiano autore delle opere shakespeariane. Milan: Gastaldi.
- Reger, Erik (17 September 1927). "Der Italiener Shakespeare". No. 435–436. Berlin: Deutsche Allgemeine Zeitung.
- Rosman, Silvia Nora (2003). Being in Common: Nation, Subject, and Community in Latin American Literature and. Bucknell University Press. ISBN 978-0-838-75552-5.
- Rossi, Carla (2018). Italus ore, Anglus pectore: studi su John Florio (PDF). Vol. 1. Thecla Academic Press.
- Savatteri, Gaetano (2018). Non c'è più la Sicilia di una volta. Laterza. ISBN 978-8-858-13506-8.
- Scaramellini, Guido (1979). "Shakespeare Valtellinese o no?". No. 21. Notiziario Popolare di Sondrio. pp. 66–71.
- Scaramellini, Guido (23 February 2011). "Storia: Shakespeare, l'inglese di... Valtellina". La Provincia di Sondrio. Archived from the original on 26 June 2021.
- Socci, Antonio (2018). Traditi, sottomessi, invasi. L'estinzione di un popolo senza figli, senza lavoro, senza futuro. Milan: Rizzoli. ISBN 978-8-817-09819-9.
- Tassinari, Lamberto (2009). John Florio: The Man Who Was Shakespeare. Translated by McCuaig, William. Montreal: Giano Books.
- Tassinari, Lamberto (2016). John Florio Alias Shakespeare. Translated by Vaïs, Michel. Le Bord de l'eau. ISBN 978-2-356-87447-4.
- Thomas, Sidney (April 1952). "Shakespeare: An Annotated Bibliography for 1951". Shakespeare Quarterly. 3 (2): 149–184. doi:10.1093/sq/3.2.149. JSTOR 2866518.
- Villa, Carlo (1951). Parigi val ben una messa! William Shakespeare & il poeta valtellinese Michelag nelo Florio. Milan: Editrice Storica.
- Villa, Carlo (1961). Fra Donne e Drammi - Shakespeare genio italiano. Bologna: Edizioni Centauro.
- Wadsworth, Frank (1958). The Poacher from Stratford: A Partial Account of the Controversy over the Authorship of Shakespeare's Plays. University of California Press. ISBN 978-0-520-01311-7.
- Yates, Frances Amelia (1934). John Florio: The Life of an Italian in Shakespeare's England. Cambridge: Cambridge University Press. ISBN 9780521170741.
