= List of Shakespeare authorship candidates =

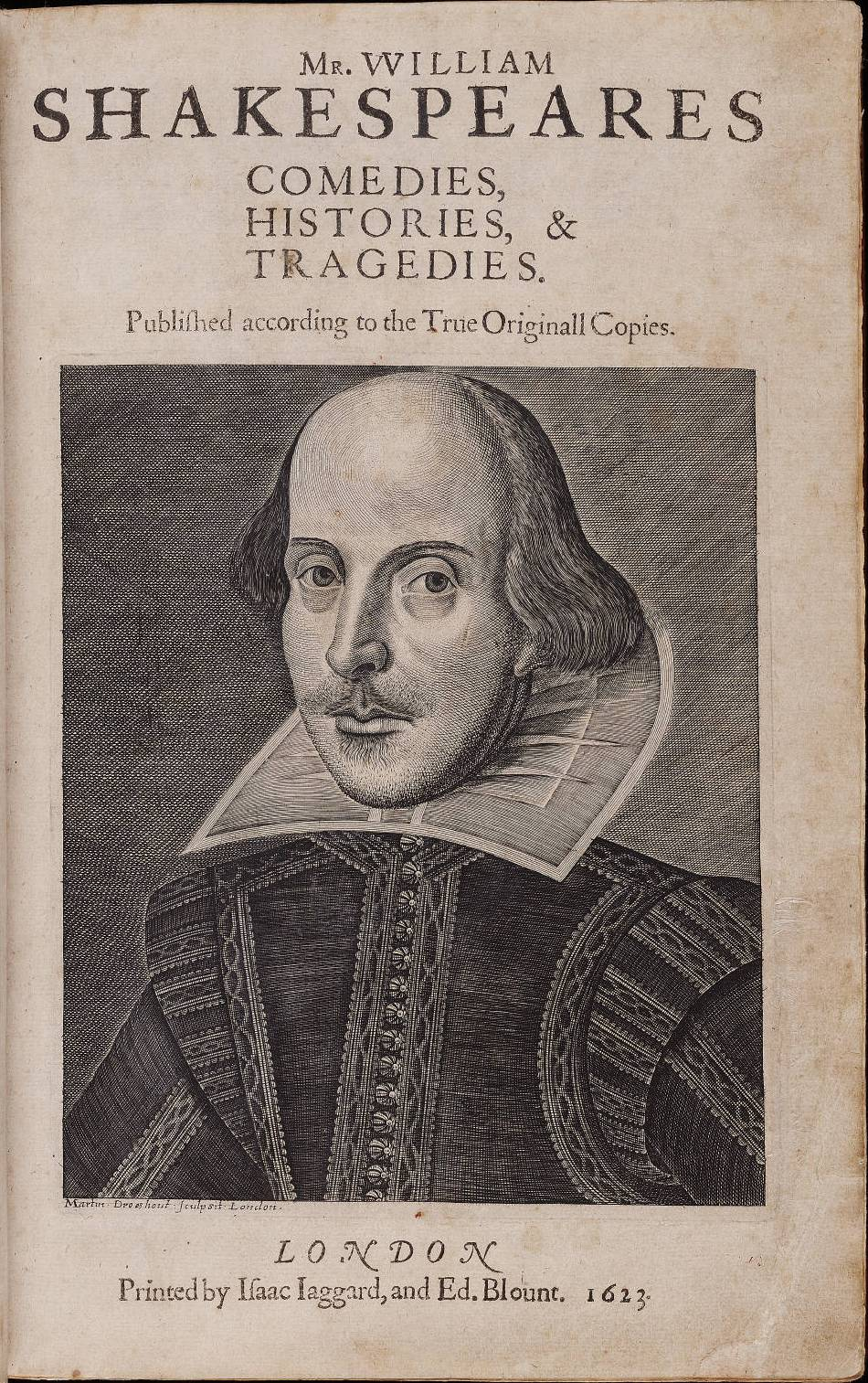
The First Folio (1623), published seven years after Shakespeare's death, includes all of his extant plays with the exception of Pericles, Prince of Tyre and The Two Noble Kinsmen.

Claims that someone other than William Shakespeare of Stratford-upon-Avon wrote the works traditionally attributed to him were first explicitly made in the 19th century, though supporters of the theory often argue that coded assertions of alternative authorship exist in texts dating back to Shakespeare's lifetime. Typically, they say that the historical Shakespeare was merely a front to shield the identity of the real author or authors, who, for reasons such as social rank, state security, or gender, could not safely take public credit. Although these claims have attracted much public interest, all but a few Shakespeare scholars and literary historians consider them to be fringe theories with no hard evidence, and for the most part disregard them except to rebut or disparage the claims.

The basis for these theories can be traced to the 18th century, when, more than 150 years after his death, Shakespeare's status was elevated to that of the greatest writer of all time. Shakespeare's pre-eminence seemed incongruous with his humble origins and obscure life, arousing suspicion that he was not the author of the works attributed to him. At the same time, the influence of biblical higher criticism led some authors to take the view that Shakespeare's works could be the product of the collaborative efforts of many authors. Public debate and a prolific body of literature date from the mid-19th century, and numerous historical figures, including Francis Bacon, the Earl of Oxford, Christopher Marlowe and the Earl of Derby, have since been nominated as the true author.

Promoters of various authorship theories assert that their particular candidate is more plausible in terms of education, life experience, and/or social status to be the true author of the Shakespeare canon. Most candidates are either members of the upper social classes or are known poets and playwrights of the day. Proponents argue that the documented life of William Shakespeare lacks the education, aristocratic sensibility, or familiarity with the royal court which they say is apparent in the works.

Mainstream Shakespeare scholars maintain that biographical interpretations of literature are unreliable for attributing authorship, and that the convergence of documentary evidence for Shakespeare's authorship—title pages, testimony by other contemporary poets and historians and official records—is the same as that for any other author of the time. No such supporting evidence exists for any other candidate, and Shakespeare's authorship was not questioned during his lifetime or for centuries after his death.

Despite the scholarly consensus, a relatively small but highly visible and diverse assortment of supporters, including some prominent public figures, are confident that someone other than William Shakespeare wrote the works attributed to him. They campaign to gain public acceptance of the authorship question as a legitimate field of academic inquiry and to promote one or another of the various authorship candidates through publications, organizations, online discussion groups and conferences.

== List ==
This list of 88 candidates is in alphabetical order of surname, so that aristocrats appear under their family name, rather than their title (e.g. "De Vere, Edward" rather than "Oxford, Earl of"). Monarchs appear under their regnal names.

=== ABC ===
- Alexander, William (1568–1640), 1st Earl of Stirling, Well-traveled nobleman, sonnet writer and playwright. Proposed in 1930 by Peter Alvor.
- Andrewes, Lancelot (1555–1626), Bishop of Winchester, scholar and theological writer, proposed in 1940 by W. M. Cunningham, as a member of a group of Freemasons.
- Bacon, Anthony (1558–1601), statesman, spy. First proposed as a contributor by Mrs. Henry Pott in 1892 and as author of the sonnets by W. H. Denning, in 1925.
- Bacon, Francis (1561–1626), lawyer, scholar, essayist. Proposed as sole author by William Henry Smith in 1856 and as a co-author by Delia Bacon in 1857. See Baconian theory of Shakespeare authorship
- Barnard, John (1604–1674), husband of Shakespeare's granddaughter, proposed by Finch Barnard in 1914.
- Barnes, Barnabe (1571–1609), poet, playwright. proposed as a member of a group theory by Alden Brooks in 1943.
- Barnfield, Richard (1574–1620), poet, proposed in 1901 in Notes and Queries.
- Blount, Charles (1563–1606), 8th Baron Mountjoy and 1st Earl of Devonshire, soldier and Knight of the Garter, proposed by Peter Alvor in 1930.
- Bodley, The Rev. Miles (c. 1553 – c. 1611), Bible scholar; proposed in 1940 (mistakenly as "Sir Miles Bodley") by W. M. Cunningham.
- Bodley, Sir Thomas (1545–1613), diplomat, scholar, proposed in 1940 by W. M. Cunningham, as a member of a group of Freemasons
- Burbage, Richard (1567–1619), actor, proposed as a co-author of Hamlet in a group theory by Wilhelm Marschall in 1926.
- Burton, Robert (1577–1640), scholar, proposed by M. L. Hore in 1885.
- Butts, William (d. 1583), patron of literature; proposed by Walter Conrad Arensberg in 1929.
- Campion, Edmund (1540–1581), poet; proposed by Joanne Ambrose in 2005.
- Cecil, Robert (1563–1612), 1st Earl of Salisbury, statesman, proposed by J. H. Maxwell in 1916.
- Cervantes, Miguel de (1547–1616), Spanish novelist, poet, and playwright; proposed by Carlos Fuentes in 1976.
- Chettle, Henry (1560–1607), playwright, polemicist, proposed as a member of a group theory by John H. Stotsenberg in 1904.
- Crollalanza, Michelangelo (1564–?), said to be a Sicilian, proposed by Martino Juvara in 2000. See Crollalanza theory of Shakespeare authorship.

=== DEF ===
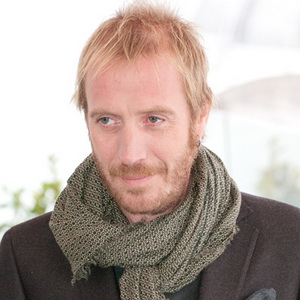
Rhys Ifans played Edward de Vere in the 2011 film Anonymous

- Daniel, Samuel (1562–1619), poet, historian, first proposed as a member of a group theory by T. W. White in 1892.
- Defoe, Daniel (1660–1731), novelist, proposed by George Magruder Battey.
- de Vere, Edward (1550–1604), 17th Earl of Oxford, courtier, poet, playwright. Proposed by J. Thomas Looney in 1920. See Oxfordian theory of Shakespeare authorship
- Dekker, Thomas (1572–1632), playwright, proposed as a member of a group theory by John H. Stotsenberg in 1904.
- Devereux, Robert (Essex) (1566–1601), 2nd Earl of Essex. proposed as dual author in 1902, and as sole author in 1905 by Lantham Davis.
- Devereux, Walter (1541?–1576), 1st Earl of Essex. Proposed as dual author with his son Robert, in 1902 by Eugen Reichel.
- Digges, Leonard (c. 1515–c. 1559), scientist, proposed by Peter Usher in 2010.
- Donne, John (1572–1631), poet, Dean of St Paul's Cathedral, proposed as part-author of the Sonnets by H.T.S. Forrest in 1923.
- Drake, Sir Francis (1540–1596), naval commander, adventurer, proposed in 1940 by W. M. Cunningham, as a member of a group of Freemasons.
- Drayton, Michael (1563–1631), playwright, proposed as a member of a group theory by John H. Stotsenberg in 1904.
- Dyer, Sir Edward (1543–1607), courtier, poet; proposed by Alden Brooks in 1943.
- Edward VI (1537–1553), King of England; proposed by W. B. Venton in 1968.
- Elizabeth I (1533–1603), Queen of England; proposed anonymously in 1857, re-proposed by W. R. Titterton in 1913 (not too seriously) and by G. E. Sweet in 1956.
- Ferrers, Henry (1549–1633), Warwickshire antiquary, first proposed as a member of a group by J. P. Yeatman in 1896.
- Fletcher, John (1579–1625), playwright, proposed as a member of a group theory by John H. Stotsenberg in 1904.
- Florio, John (1554–1625), linguist, proposed by Erik Reger in 1927, and advocated by Lamberto Tassinari in 2014. See Florian theory of Shakespeare authorship.
- Florio, Michelangelo (1515–1572), Protestant evangelist and scholar; proposed by Santi Paladino in 1925. See Crollalanza theory of Shakespeare authorship.

=== G–L ===
Encounter with authorship candidates in a dream. Left to right: William Shakespeare, Anne Hathaway, Christopher Marlowe and Sheik Zubayr. The Dreaming: Waking Hours (2020)

- Greene, Robert (1558–1592), playwright, polemicist, first proposed as a member of a group theory by T.W. White in 1892.
- Greville, Fulke (1554–1628), 1st Baron Brooke; proposed by A. W. L. Saunders in 2007.
- Griffin, Bartholomew (d. 1602), poet, first proposed as a member of a group by J.P. Yeatman in 1896.
- Hastings, William. Supposed son of Queen Elizabeth; proposed by Robert Nield in 2007.
- Hathaway, Anne (1555/6–1623), Shakespeare's wife, proposed by J. P. de Fonseka, 1938.
- Herbert, William (1580–1630), 3rd Earl of Pembroke, scholar, patron, Chancellor of the University of Oxford, founder Pembroke College. first proposed as a member of a group by J.P. Yeatman in 1896.
- Heywood, Thomas (1574–1641), playwright, proposed as a member of a group theory by John H. Stotsenberg in 1904.
- James VI and I (1566–1625), King of Scotland and England, proposed by Malcolm X in 1965.
- The Jesuits, proposed by Harold Johnson in Did the Jesuits Write 'Shakespeare'? (1916).
- Jonson, Ben (1572–1637), playwright, poet, first proposed as a member of a group theory by John H. Stotsenberg in 1904.
- Kyd, Thomas (1558–1594), playwright, proposed as a member of a group by Alden Brooks in 1937.
- Lanier, Emilia née Bassano (1569–1645), poet; proposed by John Hudson in 2007. See Emilia Lanier theory of Shakespeare authorship
- Lodge, Thomas (1557–1625), playwright, first proposed as a member of a group theory by T.W. White in 1892.
- Lyly, John (1554–1606), playwright, prose stylist, theatre troupe manager, proposed as a member of a group by Alden Brooks in 1937.

=== M–R ===
- Manners, Elizabeth Sidney (d. 1615), Countess of Rutland, proposed as a member of a group by C.G. Muskat in 1925.
- Manners, Roger (1576–1612), 5th Earl of Rutland; first proposed by Peter Alvor in 1906; also by Ilya Gililov (The Shakespeare Game, Or the Mystery of the Great Phoenix, 1997; English translation, 2003).
- Marlowe, Christopher (1564–1593), playwright; first proposed as a member of a group theory by T.W. White in 1892. First proposed as sole author by Wilbur G. Zeigler. – see Marlovian theory of Shakespeare authorship
- Mary, Queen of Scots (1542–1587).
- Matthew, Sir Tobie (1577–1655), courtier, Catholic priest, proposed in 1940 by Dr. W.M. Cunningham, as a member of a group of Freemasons
- Middleton, Thomas (1580–1627), playwright.
- More, Sir Thomas (1478–1535), Lord Chancellor of England and Saint of the Catholic Church, proposed in 1940 by W. M. Cunningham, as a member of a group of Freemasons
- Munday, Anthony (1560–1633), dramatist first proposed as a member of a group theory by T.W. White in 1892.
- Nashe, Thomas (1567–1601), poet, polemicist.
- Neville, Henry (1564–1615) politician and courtier; proposed by Brenda James and William Rubenstein in 2005. See Nevillean theory of Shakespeare authorship.
- North, Thomas (1535–1604), translator of Plutarch's Parallel Lives, proposed by Dennis McCarthy in 2011.
- Nugent, William (1550–1625), Irish rebel; first proposed by Elizabeth Hickey in 1978.
- O'Toole, Patrick, Irishman, citizen of Ennis, first proposed by George Newcomen in 1897.
- Paget, Henry (d. 1568), 2nd Baron Paget.
- Peele, George (1556–1596), playwright, first proposed as a member of a group theory by T.W. White in 1892.
- Percy, William (1574–1648), poet and playwright. Proposed by Anna Faktorovich for most of Shakespeare's tragedies.
- Pierce, William (1561–1674), claimed writer; proposed by Peter Zenner in 1999.
- Porter, Henry (fl. c. 1596–99), playwright.
- Raleigh, Sir Walter (1554–1618), courtier, poet. Proposed as a co-author by Delia Bacon in 1857 and as sole author by George S. Caldwell 20 years later.
- The Rosicrucians.

=== S–Z ===
- Sackville, Thomas (1536–1608), Lord Buckhurst, 1st Earl of Dorset.
- Seymour, William, "bastardized" son of Earl of Hertford and Lady Catherine Grey, and supposedly raised by Mary Shakespeare. Proposed by Ira Sedgwick Proper in 1953.
- Shapleigh, Sir William, a fictional character invented by historian Justin Winsor in Was Shakespeare Shapleigh? A Correspondence in Two Entanglements that lampoons Ignatius Donnelly's The Great Cryptogram.
- Shirley, Sir Anthony (1565?–1635), soldier, sailor, adventurer.
- Sidney Herbert, Mary (1561–1621), Countess of Pembroke, proposed by Gilbert Slater in 1931.
- Sidney, Sir Philip (1554–1586), poet, soldier, courtier.
- Smith, Wentworth (1571– c. 1623), playwright.
- Spenser, Edmund (1552–1599), poet; proposed in 1940 by W. M. Cunningham.
- Stanley, William, 6th Earl of Derby (1561–1642), first proposed by James Greenstreet in 1891. See Derbyite theory of Shakespeare authorship
- Talbot, Gilbert (1552–1616), 7th Earl of Shrewsbury.
- Warner, William (c. 1558–1609), poet.
- Watson, Thomas (1555–1592), poet.
- Webster, John (1580?–1625?), playwright.
- Whateley, Anne (1561?–1600?), Shakespeare's supposed first fiancée, proposed in 1939 by William Ross.
- Wilson, Robert (1572–1600), playwright.
- Wolsey, Thomas (1473?–1530) Cardinal of England, proposed by the anonymous J.G.B. in 1887.
- Wotton, Sir Henry (1568–1639), scholar, diplomat; proposed in 1940 by Dr. W.M. Cunningham, as a member of a group of Freemasons
- Wriothesley, Henry (1573–1624), 3rd Earl of Southampton, first proposed as a member of a group by J.P. Yeatman in 1896.
- Zubayr bin William, Shaykh ("Sheik Zubayr"), supposed Arab scholar, first proposed frivolously by Ahmad Faris al-Shidyaq and later in earnest by Safa Khulusi; was endorsed by Muammar Gaddafi in 1989.

== See also ==
- The Klingon Hamlet
