= Tassinari =

Tassinari is an Italian surname. Notable people with the surname include:

- Giuseppe Tassinari (1891–1944), Italian politician
- Lamberto Tassinari (born 1945), Italian writer and editor
- Pia Tassinari (1903–1995), Italian opera singer
