= Crollalanza theory of Shakespeare authorship =

Posits Shakespeare was an Italian emigrant

The Crollalanza theory of Shakespeare's identity posits that Shakespeare was an Italian called Michelangelo Florio a.k.a. "Crollalanza", whose mother's family name is variously given as Crollalanza or Scrollalanza ("shake-speare"). He is said to have emigrated to England where he became (or at least was responsible for the works attributed to) William Shakespeare of Stratford-upon-Avon. First proposed in the 1920s by Santi Paladino, who claimed Michelangelo Florio was involved in creating Shakespeare's works, the Crollalanza hypothesis has gone through several permutations and developments. In most recent versions, the character's birthplace has moved from the North to the South of Italy. Paladini suggested that Michelangelo Florio was the real author of Shakespeare's works. But historical documents written by Michelangelo Florio himself disproved those claims. Independent filmmaker Alicia Maksimova released in 2016 a documentary film Was Shakespeare English?, covering this topic, which lacks scholarly support.

This story has become known in Italy, but is much less well known elsewhere. Its central notion is that the name "Shakespeare" is an anglicised translation of an Italian immigrant's surname. But no historical documents proved those claims: in fact Michelangelo Florio lived in England only from 1 November 1550, when he arrived in the City of London, until 1554, when Mary Tudor ascended to the throne and she re-established Catholicism in England and Ireland. Consequently, on 4 March 1554, Michelangelo and his family fled to continental Europe. The theory has been dismissed by Sonia Massai, reader in Shakespeare studies at King's College London, as being proposed by "a most eccentric breed of anti-Stratfordians." Carla Dente of Pisa University calls it an example of "fantastic biographical reconstructions", and remarks that it depends too much on the assumption that Shakespeare's heavy use of Italian settings in his plays must mean that he was Italian.

== Origins of the theory ==
The Crollalanza theory seems to have been first set out in Santi Paladino's 1929 pamphlet Shakespeare sarebbe lo pseudonimo di un poeta italiano ("Shakespeare would be the pen name of an Italian poet"). In the early versions Crollalanza was said to be from a Calvinist family in Valchiavenna or nearby Valtellina in Northern Italy.

The literary scholars Frances Yates and Keir Elam believe that Paladino initially confused the Elizabethan linguist John Florio with his Italian-born father Michelangelo Florio. However, according to Keir Elam, in the 1950s Paladino decided that Shakespeare was in fact Michelangelo Florio, the father of John Florio, and that the father and son collaborated on the plays, with John Florio improving his father's English—making the Crollalanza theory, at this stage, a version of the John Florio authorship theory. Elam also remarks that "Italian, or perhaps Sicilian nationalism" gave rise to this theory.

Elam implies that the name Crollalanza was part of Palladino's theories from the 1920s, but Shaul Bassi of the University of Venice suggests that the first clear identification of Crollalanza as Shakespeare's original name came from the once-famous medium Luigi Bellotti who in 1936 told a reporter that Shakespeare had communicated with him "psychographically" and revealed that his real name was Crollalanza, from Valtellina. In 1943 Bellotti published a pamphlet repeating these claims: L'Italianità di Shakespeare: Guglielmo Crollalanza grande genio italiano.

In 2002 Martino Iuvara published Shakespeare era Italiano: Saggio (Shakespeare was an Italian: an Essay). In this work, Iuvara, a retired Sicilian journalist and teacher of languages, claimed to have traced a Calvinist called Michelangelo Florio (the same name as the Elizabethan humanist John Florio's father, and likely related to their family) who was born in the Sicilian city of Messina on April 23, 1564, the same date as is commonly given for William Shakespeare's birth in Stratford.

Iuvara's theories had emerged into broader public awareness in 2000, during a round-table discussion conducted at the Turin Book Fair that year. According to Iuvara, the name Shakespeare was adopted as a pseudonym by this Michelangelo Florio, born in Messina in 1564 to a couple named Giovanni Florio and Guglielma Crollalanza. The father was a Calvinist who placed the family in difficult circumstances by writing a heretical pamphlet. The son, Michelangelo, sought sanctuary in Venice, and then subsequently escaped to England, where he assumed a new name, "Shakespeare", this being an English calque on crolla/scrolla (collapse/shake) and lanza (spear). Conflict with records showing the existence of Shakespeares in the Stratford area long before the possible arrival of Michelangelo Florio "Crollalanza" is avoided by suggesting that these were a branch of his mother's family. Carla Dente notes that in Iuvara's 2002 book he supposes that "Crollalanza" took the identity of "a cousin on his mother's side, who had died prematurely and had lived in Stratford like the rest of the Crollalanza family, whose name was roughly translated as Shakespear", but that his evidence for this is very indirect.

In 2008 the Italian Canadian literary editor Lamberto Tassinari published a 378 page book Shakespeare? È il nome d'arte di John Florio (Shakespeare? It is John Florio's pen name) which makes a case, similar to Iuvara's, that both Shakespeare's fondness for Italian settings and his knowledge of Italy exceed what is credible for the historical William Shakespeare from Stratford. However in a public discussion in 2011 Tassinari insisted that the Michelangelo or Michel Agnolo [sic] Florio who features in his scenarios is always Michelangelo Florio, the well attested North-Italian-born father of the Elizabethan humanist John Florio, and must not be equated with the Sicilian "Crollalanza", whom he calls an ill-documented "fantomatico cugino" (phantom/elusive cousin) of John Florio (whom he considers to be the real Shakespeare). At present, therefore, it seems the Crollalanza theory must be considered separate from theories that the Elizabethan John Florio (with or without his father Michelangelo Florio) wrote, or collaborated in writing Shakespeare's plays.

Some believers in the Crollalanza theory came close to creating a minor international incident in Rome in March 2016 when they "crashed" the British embassy's exhibition Shakespeare Lives in Italy, claiming that the British were appropriating a Sicilian author.

== Impact and criticism ==
Iuvara's book is not available in English, and there is little peer-reviewed literature that considers it. However the academic Carla Dente, writing in 2013 in the Journal of Anglo-Italian Studies, offers a brief discussion of his contentions. She finds Iuvara's theory implausible, but sees it as evidence of the internationalization of Shakespeare, in that the desire to believe that the real Shakespeare was a person of one's own class, ethnicity, views, or religion has now spread to other nations. After noting that, "Such fantastic biographical reconstructions and equally fantastic textual attributions regularly occur, both in England and in other countries," she comments:

One can only conclude that, to all appearances, the phenomenon of moving from an appropriation of Shakespeare's texts to the appropriation of his person has recently taken root also in Italy.

Of the practical problems with Iuvara's story, Dente says,

I shall only mention the question of language: according to Juvara, Shakespeare wrote in Italian and then had his first works translated by his wife before putting them on at The Globe.

The Shakespearean editor and scholar Keir Elam disagrees with Iuvara (and Tassarini) about Shakespeare's Italian knowledge. He argues that this required no personal experience of Italy, but was obtained in England, and primarily by reading John Florio's 1591 book about Italian culture and language Second Fruits. Scholars, including the Renaissance theater scholar Jack D'Amico, have also noted the "generic" vagueness of many of Shakespeare's Italian settings, and occasional outright errors like, "Milan's seaport in The Tempest (1.2.145)".

As mentioned above under "Origins of the Theory", in 2016 when the British Embassy in Rome hosted an exhibition called Shakespeare lives in Italy, Paola Marinozzi presented a RAI television program, available online, in which she interviewed an actor and media personality known as Pif (Pierfrancesco Diliberto), universally recognized in Italy as a prankster. Pif argues that "This exhibition is a usurpation" ("Questa manifestazione è abusiva") because it does not recognize that Shakespeare was a Sicilian called Guglielmo (William) Scrollalanza, and that he wrote originally not "To be or not to be" but (in Sicilian dialect) "Iessere o nun iessere". The British ambassador Christopher Prentice appears briefly in the interview, and responds, with understated sardonic humour, to Pif's claims. However, this interview was clearly a joke around the Scrollalanza theory, in which the RAI journalist, Pif (nickname for Pierfrancesco Diliberto) and Christopher Prentice enjoyed playing their respective roles.

== The Crollalanza story as literary myth ==
Some Italian writers have welcomed the story of a Sicilian Shakespeare as an attractive literary myth. In retelling it some have also changed the name from Crollalanza, which in today's Italian would tend to mean "spear collapses" or "spear gives way", to Scrollalanza, which unambiguously means "shakes spear". (Both these are rare but real surnames.)

Andrea Camilleri, the celebrated writer who created the detective figure Salvo Montalbano, has co-written with Giuseppe Dipasquale a comedy in Sicilian dialect Troppu trafficu ppi nenti (2009), based on Shakespeare's Much Ado About Nothing, which plays mischievously on the theory that Shakespeare was of Sicilian origin. Earlier, in a humorous article in 2000, "Shakespeare, Mafia Made-Man from Canicattì, Camilleri teases believers in Crollalanza over coincidences in their story: "... he [Crollalanza] went to live in Venice in a palace that, wouldn't you know it, was built by a certain Mr Othello who had in a fit of jealousy strangled his wife (wouldn't you know it, her name was Desdemona)..." He also suggests that a better English translation of Crollalanza would be "Collapsespeare"; and asks why, if Shakespeare was so Sicilian, he never set a play in Canicattì? Yet Camilleri concludes: "I confess: it would please me quite a lot to know Shakespeare was a fellow Sicilian."

In the 2008 novel Il Manoscritto di Shakespeare, by Domenico Seminerio, a luckless Sicilian schoolteacher finds evidence of Shakespeare's being Sicilian and shows it to a famous writer who fictionalises the material, with comic results. Seminerio includes in his acknowledgements a tribute to Iuvara: "I address affectionate thanks to the late schoolteacher Martino Iuvara, author of the study titled Shakespeare was an Italian." However, according to Manlio Bellomo, a professor of law at Catania University, this should not be taken entirely at face value.

In Bellomo's own 2013 novel L'isola di Shakespeare, set on the Aeolian island of Salina, a semi-historical 16th century character narrates a very unreliable memory of having met there a shipwrecked Englishman called Shakespeare, who speaks fluent Italian, says his mother Guglielma Scrollalanza came from Sicily—and proceeds to collect some of his most famous lines from conversations on the island. However, in a brief afterword (Postfazione) to the novel, Bellomo makes it clear that for him the Crollalanza theory is an enjoyable literary myth. He describes Iuvara's book as "amusing and embarrassing" and "lacking any scientific [i.e. scholarly] rigor", and says it contains theories so fanciful and reckless ("fantasiose e temerarie") that: "It is only possible to embellish/fictionalize them; and this Domenico Seminario has done, with masterful irony, in Il manoscritto di Shakespeare." (Note: The italian original reads: "Vi si leggono ipotesi fantasiose e temerarie. È solo possibile romanzarle, e lo ha fatto, con magistrale ironia, Domenico Seminerio, Il manoscritto di Shakespeare.")

== See also ==
- Florian theory of Shakespeare authorship, the idea that Michelangelo Florio's son was the author of Shakespeare's work
