= Frank Wadsworth =

Frank Wadsworth may refer to:

- Frank H. Wadsworth (1915–2022), American forester and conservationist
- Frank W. Wadsworth (1919–2012), American Shakespearean scholar, author, and sportsman
