= Poly-Olbion =

1612 poem by Michael Drayton

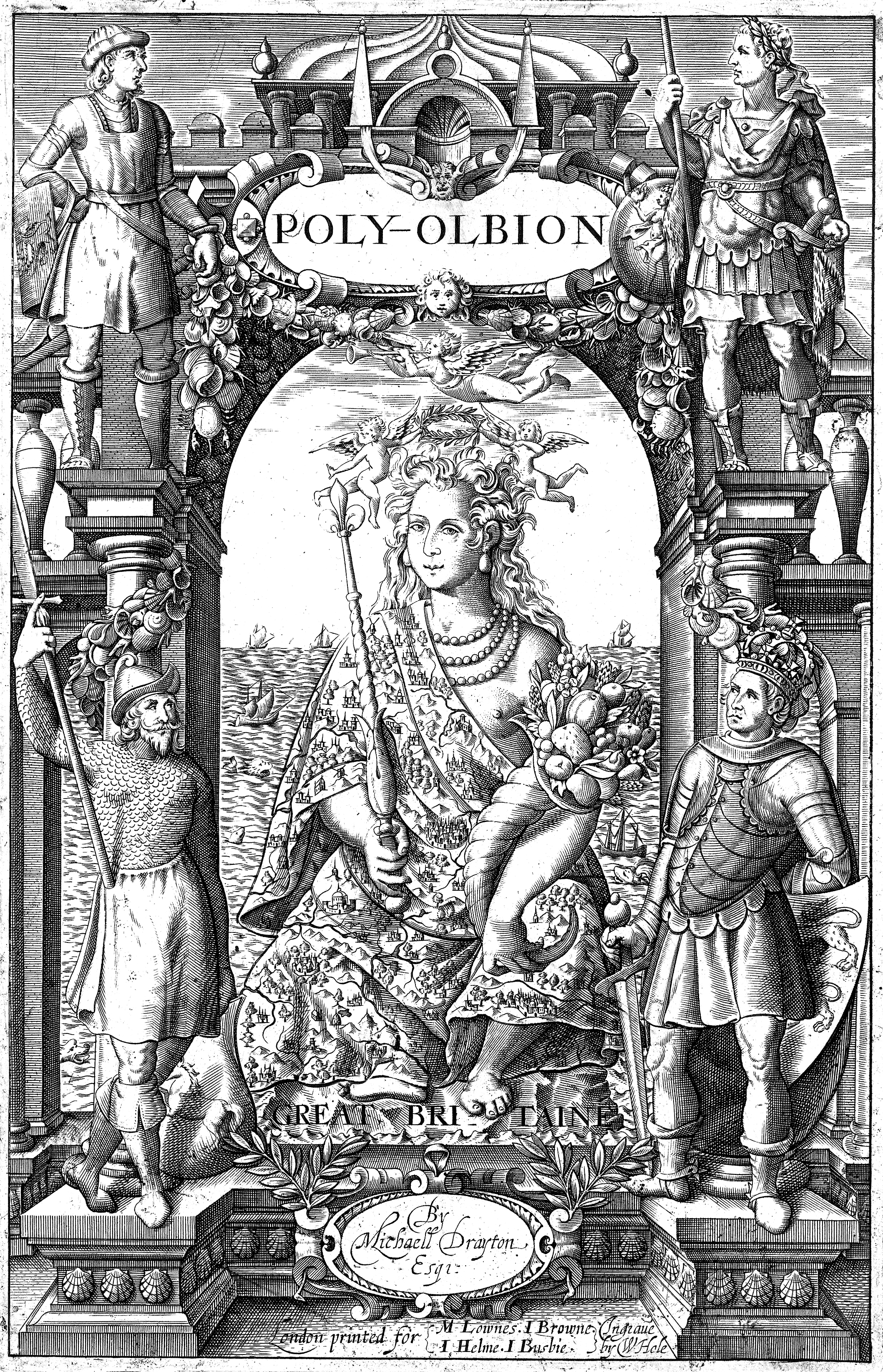
Title-page of "Poly-Olbion"

The Poly-Olbion is a topographical poem describing England and Wales. Written by Michael Drayton (1563–1631) and published in 1612, it was reprinted with a second part in 1622. Drayton had been working on the project since at least 1598.

== Content ==
The Poly-Olbion is divided into thirty songs, written in alexandrine couplets, consisting in total of almost 15,000 lines of verse. Drayton intended to compose a further part to cover Scotland, but no part of this work is known to have survived. Each song describes between one and three counties, describing their topography, traditions and histories. Copies were illustrated with maps of each county, drawn by William Hole, whereon places were depicted anthropomorphically.

The first book was accompanied by historical and philological summaries written by John Selden.

Because of its length and its author's conflicting goals the Poly-Olbion was almost never read as a whole, but is an important source for the period nevertheless. Drayton strained to combine correct scientific information about Britain (mostly contained in Selden's commentary) with his desire to provide as many memorial anchors to the elusive ancient Celtic Britons, Druids, Bards, and King Arthur as possible.

== See also ==
- 1612 in poetry
- 1622 in poetry

== Bibliography ==
- William H. Moore, Poly-Olbion Summary
- Oliver Elton, Michael Drayton; a Critical Study, with a Bibliography
