= Antonio Socci =

Italian journalist and author (born 1956)

Antonio Socci (born 18 January 1959) is an Italian media personality, journalist, and writer. He began his career in the 1980s writing for several Italian publications, working for the RAI, Italy's public television, in the early 2000s. His main interests include the Catholic Church, about which he wrote several books.

== Early life and education ==
Socci was born on 18 January 1959 in Siena. Socci studied at the University of Siena under literary critic Franco Fortini and earned a bachelor's degree in literature in 1983. In 1984, he began writing for the weekly Il Sabato. He then returned to Siena for three years to direct the cultural office of the province of Siena, after which he returned to Il Sabato.

== Career ==
In 1994, Socci moved to Il Giornale as a columnist. He also contributed to publications such as Il Foglio, Libero, and Panorama. In 2002, he moved to the national television network RAI as deputy director of the RAI 2 channel, where he was the author and host of Excalibur. In 2004, on behalf of RAI, he became the director of the School of Radio and Television Journalism in Perugia.

Socci is best known for coverage of Catholic Church topics, including general history and subjects, such the Secrets of Fatima and the works of Pope John Paul II. Socci is the author fo several books and articles. He wrote I nuovi perseguitati (2002), Uno strano cristiano (2003), Mistero Medjugorje (2005), and Il quarto segreto di Fatima (2006). He stated that the 2013 papal election of Pope Francis was invalid and criticised his homilies and pontificate for being too "communist".

== See also ==
- Television in Italy
