= François Laroque =

- Born: April 26, 1948 (age 78)
- Education: École Normale Supérieure
- Occupations: Shakespeare specialist, English literature academic

François Laroque (born 26 April 1948) is a French academic and translator specialising in the works of William Shakespeare. He is professor emeritus of the University of Sorbonne Nouvelle Paris 3 since 2014.

== Career ==
François Laroque is a former student of the École Normale Supérieure, he graduated with a Docteur d'État in 1985. He taught English literature at the Paul Valéry University, Montpellier III from 1973 to 1990, then at the New Sorbonne University in Paris from 1990 to 2014.

He is a Shakespeare specialist and a member of the centre for Elizabethan research at Paul Valéry University. In addition to numerous articles on Shakespeare’s plays and on the attitudes and folklore of Elizabethan England, Laroque is also the author of Shakespeare et la fête (1988), translated into English and published at Cambridge University Press in 1991 under the title Shakespeare’s Festive World. He wrote Shakespeare : Comme il vous plaira for the collection ‘Découvertes Gallimard’, translated into ten languages, including English, and often reprinted, as well as a collaborator on an anthology of English literature.

He participated in the writing of a two-volume collective work on English Renaissance theatre, the Théâtre élisabéthain, published in the collection ‘Bibliothèque de la Pléiade’ on 22 October 2009.

== Selected publications ==
- The Journal of François Laroque, Ye Galleon Press, 1981
- Shakespeare’s Festive World: Elizabethan Seasonal Entertainment and the Professional Stage, Cambridge University Press, 1991, paperback in 1993
- Co-author with Alain Morvan and André Topia, Anthologie de la littérature anglaise, Presses Universitaires de France, 1991
- Shakespeare : Comme il vous plaira, collection « Découvertes Gallimard » (nº 126), série Littératures. Éditions Gallimard, 1991 (eleven international editions: American, British, German, Hungarian, Japanese, Korean, Portuguese, Russian, Swedish, Simplified and Traditional Chinese)
  - US edition – The Age of Shakespeare, "Abrams Discoveries" series. Harry N. Abrams, 1993
  - UK edition – Shakespeare: Court, Crowd and Playhouse, ‘New Horizons’ series. Thames & Hudson, 1993
- Co-editor with Pierre Iselin and Sophie Alatorre, "And that’s true too": New Essays on King Lear, Cambridge Scholars Publishing, 2009
- Dictionnaire amoureux de Shakespeare, Plon, 2016

Translations

- Roméo et Juliette, Livre de Poche, 2005
- Le marchand de Venise, Le livre de Poche, 2008
- La Tempête, Livre de Poche, 2011
