= Santi Paladino =

Italian journalist, politician and writer

- Born: 1902; Scilla, Calabria
- Died: 1981 (aged 78–79)
- Resting place: Rome
- Occupations: Journalist; Writer; Politician
- Years active: 1926-1960
- Notable work: Un italiano autore delle opere shakespeariane (1955)

Santi Paladino (1902 – 1981) was an Italian journalist, politician and writer, who is best known for his theory that Michelangelo Florio was the real author of the works of Shakespeare, a view he propounded in several publications from 1927 on.

He was also the founder of the Italian Unionist Movement, a short-lived anti-Communist political party that existed from 1944 to 1948. It advocated a federal union between Italy and the United States.

== Journalism and other writings ==
Originally from Scilla, Calabria, in 1926 Paladino founded Sirena, a literary journal and magazine concentrating on Sicilian and Calabrian culture. He also wrote on miscellaneous topics, including a manual entitled How to write and co-write a film script: Theoretical and practical guide (1943).

== Shakespeare authorship ==
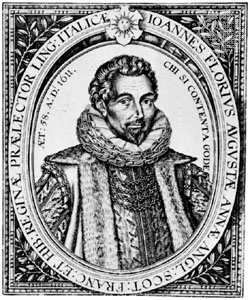
John Florio, 1611. Engraving by William Hole from the 2nd edition of Florio's dictionary. According to Paladino John produced the final versions of the plays originally created by his father.

Paladino first suggested that Michelangelo Florio was the author of Shakespeare's works in 1927. His views were first put forward in the fascist literary journal L'Impero in February of that year. His arguments were presented in full in the booklet Shakespeare sarebbe lo pseudonimo di un poeta italiano (1929). In the same year he founded the Accademia Shakespeariana to promote his views. However, it was dissolved in the following year by the local authorities. Its aims were declared contrary to public policy by the fascist government. Paladino's documents were confiscated and the sale of his book banned.

Paladino's theory is linked to the argument put forward by other "anti-Stratfordians" that Shakespeare's work shows an intimate knowledge of Italian culture and geography. He argued that Florio was a Sicilian Calvinist who had been forced to move to England to avoid persecution by the Catholic church. He invented the name Shakespeare by translating his mother's maiden name, Crollalanza, into English. Hermann W. Haller describes the 1929 booklet as "a pamphlet rife with fantasy and historical distortions". Frances Yates called it an "astonishing work", containing claims that Florio had travelled to Spain, Austria, Athens, France and Denmark, but providing "no authority" for these assertions. According to Yates, Paladino's argument was somewhat weakened by the fact that he confused Michelangelo with his son John Florio. Much of Paladino's argument rests on the similarity of verses in the book Second Fruits to lines from Hamlet. In fact the book is by John, not Michelangelo.

After World War II, Paladino's ideas were revived by Carlo Villa in a novel published in 1951. Villa supplemented the novel with an essay arguing for Florio's authorship. In Villa's version Florio becomes Shakespeare quite literally, after he is adopted by John Shakespeare. "Friderico Georgi" (Franz Saalbach) also published a book promoting the hypothesis. After this, Paladino revived his ideas, adapting his theory to address his original confusion between the Florios. In Un italiano autore delle opere shakespeariane (1955) he argued that Michelangelo and John Florio had worked together on the plays, Michelangelo writing the original version in Italian and John perfecting the English-language translation. The duo then entered into a "secret agreement" with the actor William Shakespeare to give him "temporary or permanent" credit for the published works.

Variations on Paladino's views have been developed by other, mostly Italian, writers, including Martino Iuvara (2002), Lamberto Tassinari (2008) and Roberta Romani (2012).

== Politics ==
On October 12, 1944, while Allied armies occupied Italy, Paladino joined with the former fascist sociologist Corrado Gini and statistician Ugo Damiani to found the anti-Communist Italian Unionist Movement. The party argued that the Government of the United States should absorb all free and democratic nations worldwide, thereby transforming itself into a world government based in Washington DC. Italy would initiate the process by joining the U.S.A. as its 49th state. This would eventually expand to produce a world government.

The party was set up in the context of the Sicilian Independence Movement of the time. Its programme was in opposition to the "Party of Reconstruction", which claimed 40,000 members in 1944, and campaigned for Sicily to be admitted as a U.S. state. Paladino wanted Italy to remain internally unified in a federal union with America. Paladino stated, "With a federation of the United States, Italy and some other nations, and a lot of atomic bombs, there would be no wars. This would solve all of Italy's problems." Paladino argued that closer union with America was necessary to counter the advance of Communism under Soviet Russian leadership.

Paladino became a leading Italian advocate of federal world government, attending the Montreux Congress of the World Movement in 1947. However, the movement was unsuccessful in Italy. After several electoral failures the party disbanded in 1948.

== Science fiction and later work ==
In the 1950s he wrote science fiction, notably a series of short stories he published in 1957, using the pseudonym "Delta Billy". His sci-fi story Oltre l'Apocalisse (Beyond the Apocalypse) was published in the series Narratori dell'Alpha-tau. Archivi del futuro (Irsa Muraro Publishing). He also wrote L'avventura di Mary (Mary's Adventure) in 1958 and L'invasione della Terra (Invasion of Earth) in 1960.

Paladino continued to publish until shortly before his death. His last work was Perché credo in Dio (Why I Believe in God), published in 1980.
