= William Hole (engraver) =

English engraver

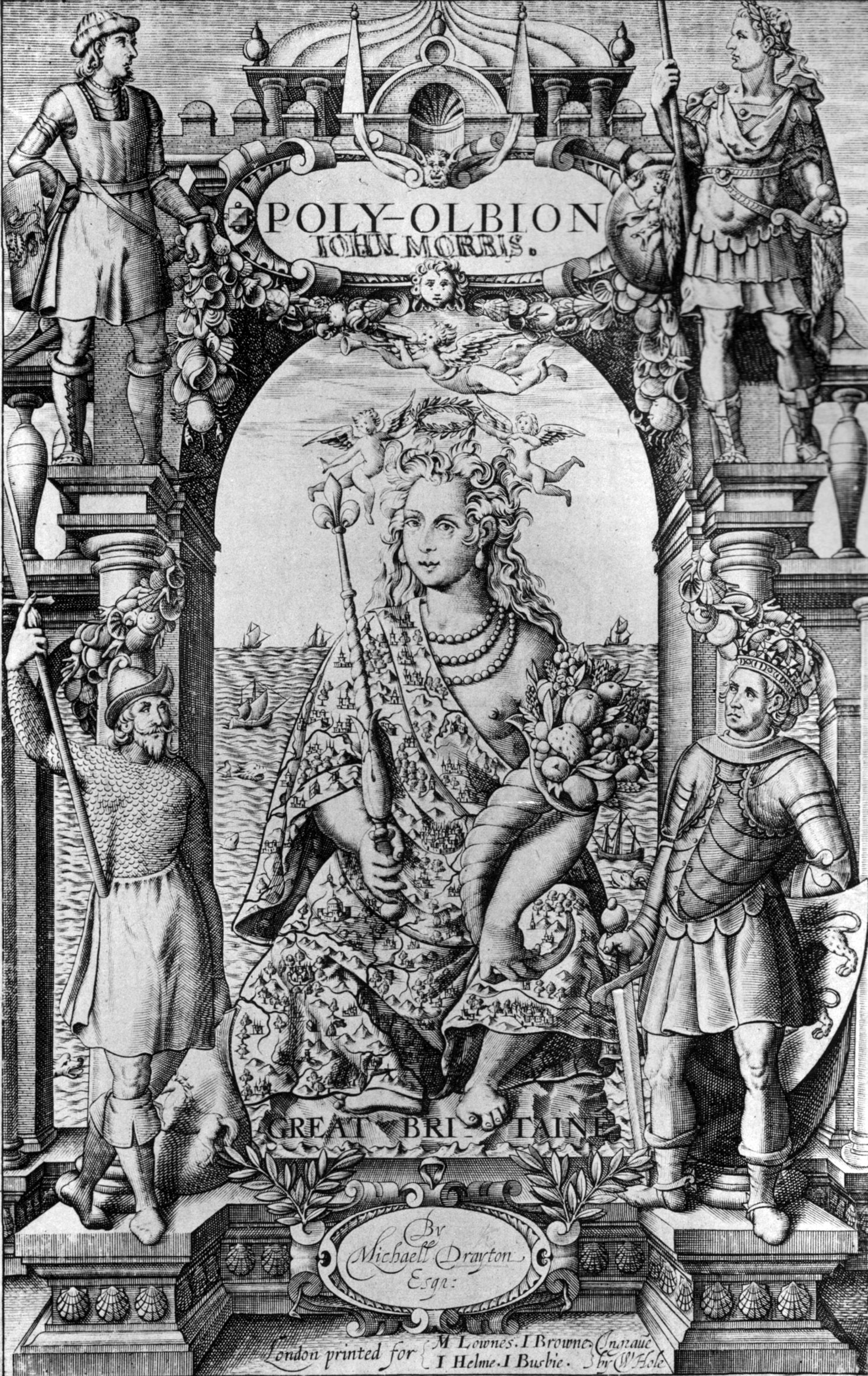
Title-page for Michael Drayton's topographical epic Poly-Olbion

William Hole or Holle (died 1624) was an English engraver.

== Career ==
His first dated plates belong to 1607, among them the title page for a London edition of the Breeches Bible.

For many books, Hole engraved a portrait of the author, such as John Florio's 1611 Italian and English dictionary, George Chapman's 1616 translation of the Iliad, and George Wither's 1617 book of poems. Hole also made maps and travelogue material.

=== Music engraving ===
For the publication Parthenia, or The Maydenhead of the First Musicke that ever was Printed for the Virginalls (c.1612), he engraved keyboard music by three English composers, Dr John Bull, William Byrd and Orlando Gibbons. This was the first time that intaglio copperplate engraving was used for English music scores, although engraved music had been printed on the continent from the late 16th century. This development was particularly important for keyboard music, as movable type was not really suitable for printing keyboard music in standard musical notation.

== Legacy ==
Some of Hole's work is in the British Museum.
