= Frank W. Wadsworth =

American Shakespearean scholar (1919–2012)

Frank Wadsworth
- Born: June 14, 1919
- Died: August 9, 2012 (aged 93)
- Occupation: literary scholar
- Years active: 1938–1987
- Notable work: The Poacher from Stratford

Frank W. Wadsworth (June 14, 1919 – August 9, 2012) was an American Shakespearean scholar, author, and sportsman.

== Life ==
He was born in New York City, the son of Prescott Kingsley Wadsworth and Elizabeth Browning (Whittemore) Wadsworth. He graduated from the Kent School in 1938 and served as a naval aviator in WWII. After the war he completed his A.B. degree at Princeton University, as well as his M.A. and Ph.D. He served on the faculty teaching English literature at the University of California, Los Angeles; the University of Pittsburgh, and was a founder and vice president for academic affairs for Purchase College. He also served as a member of the selection committee for The Woodrow Wilson National Fellowship Foundation; and as a member of the advisory council, Department of English Princeton University.

He was named a John Simon Guggenheim Memorial Foundation Fellow in 1961, and was the recipient of numerous academic awards and honors, including a Woodrow Wilson Fellowship, Folger Shakespeare Library Fellow, and honorary Phi Beta Kappa.

Wadsworth was a trustee of the Wenner-Gren Foundation for Anthropological Research from 1970 to 2006, an organization supporting anthropological research, and served as chairman of the board from 1977 to 1987. In recognition of his commitment to the scholarly integrity of anthropology, the foundation renamed the Professional Development International Fellowship the Wadsworth Fellowship Program. His hobbies included horseback riding and sailing. He is buried in Arlington, Vermont.

== The Poacher from Stratford ==
Wadsworth was probably best known to the public for his The Poacher from Stratford (1958), a popular defense of Shakespeare's authorship and the first such book written by an academic Shakespearean scholar. He thought that Shakespeare scholars should not dismiss the claims of those who believe that someone other than Shakespeare wrote the canon, and that treating the subject with silence worked instead to encourage rather than discourage such theories. Thirty-five years later he reviewed the field in an article published in the Shakespeare Newsletter, "The Poacher Re-Visited," in which he wrote:

It is important that we recognize the iconoclasts, particularly those of us who are teachers. But as Shakespeareans … we should not do it by visiting upon them the disdain of the past but by letting them speak freely for themselves … Our role should be not to suppress debate but to instruct students how to consider the Oxfordians’ (and others’) arguments carefully and thoughtfully. That exercise will make students not just more responsible as far as Shakespeare is concerned, but also wiser, more critical, more judicial, in dealing with the complex challenges they will face in the difficult decades which lie ahead of them.
We demystify authorship controversies, assassination conspiracies, theories of extra-terrestrial shindigs, even painful social demands, by letting their proponents speak out, not by censoring them. At least that’s what I thought when I wrote The Poacher from Stratford. And still do.

== Major works ==
- The White Devil: An Historical and Critical Study. Princeton University Press, 1951.
- "The Relationship of Lust’s Dominion and John Mason’s The Turke." ELH 20:3, 1953.
- "'Sound and Fury'—King Lear on Television." Quarterly of Film, Radio and Television 8:3, 1954.
- "The Revenger’s Tragedy" MLA Review, 1955.
- "Orwell as a Novelist: The Early Work". University of Kansas Review, 12:2, 1955.
- "Webster's Duchess of Malfi in the Light of Some Contemporary Ideas on Marriage and Remarriage". Philological Quarterly, 35:4, 1956.
- The Poacher from Stratford: A Partial Account of the Controversy over the Authorship of Shakespeare's Plays. California University Press; Cambridge University Press, 1958.
- "Hamlet and Iago: Nineteenth-Century Breeches Parts". Shakespeare Quarterly 17:2, 1966.
- "Some Nineteenth-Century Revivals of The Duchess of Malfi", Theatre Survey, 8.2 (1967)
- "'Shorn and Abated'–British Performances of The Duchess of Malfi". Theatre Survey 10:2, 1969
- "University Teaching—The State of the Art". Metaphilosophy, 3:1, 1972.
- "William Shakespeare", World Book Encyclopedia, 1989.
