= Michelangelo Florio =

Protestant Pastor and Former Franciscan Friar; father of John Florio

Michelangelo Florio (1515–1566), possibly born in Florence, died in Soglio, was the son of a Franciscan friar, before converting to Protestantism. He was a pastor in both England and Switzerland, and father of the renaissance humanist John Florio.

== Life ==
Michelangelo Florio was born in Tuscany. The precise city of his birth is unknown, though in his Apology he describes himself as a Florentine. Francis Yates however argued that his assertion could be simply a boast in order to acquire prestige, by associating his origins with a city of great cultural prestige, It is possible he may have been born in Lucca or Siena.

He was orphaned before his adolescence, and was thereafter raised by relatives in Trentino, before entering the Franciscan Order under the name of Paolo Antonio. In that capacity, he began to preach in a number of Italian towns.

=== Conversion ===
The spread of Lutheranism began to influence his thinking, and from the 1540s onwards he expressed his newly acquired beliefs while preaching from the church's pulpits. In 1548, he was arrested for heresy, and subsequently imprisoned in Rome that same year. After two years of imprisonment, he was brought to trial and condemned to death. He managed to avoid execution by escaping from prison on 6 May 1550. Abandoning his Franciscan habit, he moved first to Abruzzo, then Naples and finally to Apulia, where he boarded a ship for Venice. He resided there, establishing contact with the English ambassador and with other Italian Protestants. In September 1550, he set out to roam throughout the whole of Lombardy, where pious persons provided for his basic needs. Searching for a safe refuge, he finally left his native Italy and settled in France, travelling through Lyon. After arriving in Paris, he managed to get passage on a ship to reach the safety of England.

=== In England ===
On 1 November 1550, he arrived in the City of London, which at that time contained many communities of Protestant refugees, who had fled from persecution by Catholics, and who had established Reformed churches, each catering to its own linguistic group, under the general superintendence of Jan Laski. Thanks perhaps to the good credentials given to him by theologians like Bernardino Ochino and Pietro Martire Vermigli, Florio won favour with both the Church of England bishop Thomas Cranmer and also with the influential Secretary of State, William Cecil, who obtained for him the position of pastor of the Reformed church for Italian speakers. He also served as secretary to Cecil, and as Lady Jane Grey's chaplain, teaching her both Italian and Latin. He dedicated to her a book of grammar, the Regole et Institutioni della Lingua Thoscana. He probably knew, and may even have taught, the future Queen Elizabeth I.

An informal relationship with a woman, which had not been sanctified by marriage, created a scandal among his churchgoers. Florio reported fourteen of them to the authorities, who punished them for ostensibly having lapsed back into Catholic beliefs. Florio's preaching was often passionately hostile to Papism and its doctrine of papal primacy, and indeed struck other reformers as somewhat excessive. Eventually, his open criticism of some aspects of the prevailing theology of his community caused conflicts with the authorities. In 1552, he was removed from his place as pastor, but managed to avoid expulsion from England by marrying the woman he lived with - her name is unknown. In 1553, they had a son, John. Florio thus managed to keep his position with William Cecil.

After the death of the young king Edward VI on 6 July 1553, a problem with the succession to the throne arose. Edward, influenced by John Dudley, 1st Duke of Northumberland - to whom Florio had dedicated his Italian translation of the catechism of the bishop of Winchester John Ponet - had designated Dudley's daughter-in-law Lady Jane Grey to succeed him. Jane, however, had an otherwise weak claim to the throne and few supporters. Mary Tudor, the eldest daughter of Henry VIII, raised an army and marched down to London and overthrew Jane and was proclaimed queen. The latter reacted violently to the elevation of Jane Grey, and had her imprisoned, while her supporters were executed. A failed rebellion in favour of Jane led to a violent anti-Protestant repression. As a result, in 1554, Florio, together with other Protestant refugees, fled England. The rebellion also led to Jane's own execution. Florio never forgot his young student, and dedicated to her memory his History of the life and death of the illustrious Jane Grey.

=== In Switzerland ===
With his wife and son, Florio settled in Strasbourg, where he got to know Federico of Salis, scion of a powerful family of the Val Bregaglia. Federico's following contained members of both religious confessions, Catholic and Protestant, though he personally was a Protestant. He offered Florio a post as pastor of Soglio in Switzerland, which had opened up after the recent death of Michele Lattanzio, another Italian refugee. Thus, the Florio family settled in Graubünden on 27 May 1554.

The majority of Soglio's inhabitants had officially converted to Protestantism on Christmas Day, 1552. There, he dedicated himself to his pastoral duties and to the education of his son John, whom he subsequently sent, when just 10 years old, to study in Tübingen. In 1557, he wrote an Apologia to defend himself from the attacks of the Italian Franciscan Bernardino Spada, whom he had known personally. Spada had accused him of being a Jew. However most of the controversies in which he was involved were with other Protestants in his Swiss canton, many of whom were refugees from Italy, who carried over from their homeland a certain impatience for ecclesiastical discipline and rituals, together with a request that theology be less dogmatic and more open to the needs both of the spirit and of reason. In 1563 Froben and Bischoff ("Hieronimo Frobenio et Nicolao Episcopio") in Basel published Florio's Italian translation of Georgius Agricola's De re metallica (L'arte de metalli), dedicated to the new Protestant queen of England, Elizabeth I.

As far as Michelangelo Florio's death is concerned, new documents prove he died in the summer of 1566.

== Writings ==
- Apologia di M. Michel Agnolo Fiorentino, ne la quale si tratta de la vera e falsa chiesa, de l'essere e qualità de la messa, de la vera presenza di Christo, de la Cena, del Papato, e primato di San Piero, de Concilij & autorità loro: scritto a un heretico, Chamogasko (Basilea?) 1557
- Historia de la vita e de la morte de l'Illustriss. Signora Giovanna Graia, Riccardo Pittore, Venetia 1607

== The Crollalanza theory ==
The Crollalanza theory of Shakespeare authorship argues that Shakespeare was, in reality, Michelangelo Florio. "Crollalanza", was Florio's mother's family name, variously given as Crollalanza or Scrollalanza ("shake-speare"). He is said to have emigrated to England where he became (or at least was responsible for the works attributed to) William Shakespeare. His son, John Florio, has also been suggested as an authorship candidate.

== Sources ==
- Francis A. Yates, John Florio, The Life of an Italian in Shakespeare's England, Cambridge, Cambridge University Press, 1934
- Emil Camenisch, Storia della Riforma e Controriforma nelle valli meridionali del Canton Grigioni, Samedan, Engadin Press 1950
- Giuliano Pellegrini, Michelangelo Florio e le sue «Regole de la lingua thoscana», in «Studi di filologia ital», XXVIII, 1954
- Luigi Firpo, La Chiesa italiana di Londra nel Cinquecento e i suoi rapporti con Ginevra, in AA. VV., Ginevra e l'Italia, Firenze, Sansoni 1959
- Giovanna Perini, Florio Michelangelo, in «Dizionario Biografico degli Italiani», XLVIII, Roma, Istituto della Enciclopedia Italiana 1997
- Lukas Vischer, Michelangelo Florio tra Italia, Inghilterra e Val Bregaglia, in «Il pretestantesimo di lingua italiana nella Svizzera», a cura di E. Campi e G. La Torre, Torino, Claudiana 2000 ISBN 88-7016-338-5
- John Strype, Memorials of the most reverend father in God Thomas Cranmer, Vol. I, University Press, Oxford, 1840, pg. 343 ff.
- John Strype, Memorials of the most reverend father in God Thomas Cranmer, Vol. II, Printed by T. Combe for the Ecclesiastical History Society, Oxford, 1848, pg. 642 ff.
