= Lamberto Tassinari =

Lamberto Tassinari (born 1945) is a writer and editor best known for his book John Florio: The Man Who Was Shakespeare. He is one of the founders of the transcultural magazine ViceVersa (not to be confused with a 1948 magazine of the same name), which he directed until its last issue in December 1996. Tassinari is one of the four writers to propose John Florio or Michelangelo Florio, among those who contested the paternity of Shakespeare's work.

== Biography ==
Lamberto Tassinari was born in Castelfiorentino, Italy on February 28, 1945. He spent his childhood on the island of Elba. After obtaining a degree in Philosophy from the University of Florence, he lived in Rome, Milan and Turin where he worked as a teacher and in several publishing companies. He moved to Montreal and became a resident in 1981. Two years later he founded, along with three other writers, the transcultural magazine ViceVersa which he directed until its last issue in December 1996. ViceVersa was a quarterly which published articles in the original language (French, English, Italian and Spanish) without any translation in the Eighties and Nineties. Tassinari participated, as editor-in-chief, to many symposiums and international events: the forum L'État des Revues at the Pompidou Centre in Paris, 1987; the symposium Città Nuova, Nuova Città at the 31st Festival dei Popoli in Florence, 1990; and the symposium Pluralism and Literature at Carleton University, Ottawa, in 1990. He took part in the CISQ International Seminar Le Projet transculturel de ViceVersa in Rome and the Concordia University’s Conference La Transculture et ViceVersa, Montreal, 2007.

Between 1982 and 2007, he taught Italian language and literature at the University of Montreal.

== Shakespeare authorship theory ==
In 2008 Lamberto Tassinari published a 378 page book Shakespeare? È il nome d'arte di John Florio (Shakespeare? It is John Florio's pen name) which makes a case that both Shakespeare's fondness for Italian settings and his knowledge of Italy exceed what is credible for the historical William Shakespeare from Stratford. However, in a public discussion in 2011 Tassinari insisted that the Michelangelo or Michel Agnolo [sic] Florio who features in his scenarios is always Michelangelo Florio, the well attested North-Italian-born father of the Elizabethan humanist John Florio, and must not be equated with Santi Paladino's Sicilian "Crollalanza", whom he calls an ill-documented "fantomatico cugino" (phantom/elusive cousin) of John Florio (whom he considers to be the real Shakespeare).

== Bibliography ==
- 1985: Durante la Partenza
- 1999: Utopies par le Hublot
- 2008 (original Italian edition): John Florio: The Man Who Was Shakespeare, Giano Books, Montreal (translated in 2009)
- 2016: John Florio Alias Shakespeare, Bord de l'eau, Carignan-de-Bordeaux
- 2025: John Florio war Shakespeare: Die Enthüllung der wahren Herkunft des großen Dramatikers, Res Novae Verlag, Aulendorf
