= Shakespeare Was a Woman and Other Heresies =

2023 book by Elizabeth Winkler

- Author: Elizabeth Winkler
- Subject: Shakespeare authorship question
- Genre: Nonfiction, literary criticism
- Publisher: Simon & Schuster
- Publication date: May 9, 2023
- Publication place: United States of America
- Pages: 416
- ISBN: 978-1-982171-26-1

Shakespeare Was a Woman and Other Heresies is a 2023 nonfiction book by journalist Elizabeth Winkler about the Shakespeare authorship question. The book uses journalism and literary criticism to explore the possibility that the works of Shakespeare were written by someone other than William Shakespeare of Stratford-upon-Avon. It also details the history of how the Shakespeare authorship question became an academic taboo.

Published by Simon & Schuster under the full title Shakespeare Was a Woman and Other Heresies: How Doubting the Bard Became the Biggest Taboo in Literature, the book contains interviews with various Shakespeare scholars, including Stanley Wells, Alexander Waugh, Marjorie Garber, Stephen Greenblatt, Ros Barber, Michael Witmore and Mark Rylance. Winkler explores arguments for alternate authorship candidates, including Edward de Vere, Mary Sidney, Christopher Marlowe, Francis Bacon, and Emilia Lanier. She also describes in detail the correspondence about the authorship question between Supreme Court Justice John Paul Stevens and Shakespeare scholar James Shapiro.

== Background and publication history ==
Shakespeare Was a Woman and Other Heresies was published in the United States by Simon & Schuster on May 9, 2023.

In 2019 Winkler, who holds English degrees from Princeton and Stanford, published an article in The Atlantic titled "Was Shakespeare a Woman?" in which she explored the possibility that the plays attributed to William Shakespeare may have been written by the poet Emilia Lanier.

Winkler received heavy backlash for the article, prompting The Atlantic to commission five response articles from well-known Shakespeare figures, including Mark Rylance, James Shapiro, and Phyllis Rackin. Shapiro in "Shakespeare Wrote Insightfully About Women. That Doesn't Mean He Was One" expressed disappointment that a talented journalist for The Wall Street Journal would promote a conspiracy theory in The Atlantic. Rackin argued that there likely were many hidden women writers in Elizabethan theater.

In an April 2023 interview with the Shakespearean Authorship Trust, Winkler stated that the book grew as a response to the controversy about her article. She wanted to explore why the Shakespeare authorship question is so explosive and why it became such a taboo to question Shakespeare.

== Reception ==
Despite its controversial subject matter, Shakespeare Was a Woman and Other Heresies has been generally well received by critics, with positive reviews published in The Guardian, Publishers Weekly, Kirkus Reviews, Winnipeg Free Press, and The Southern Bookseller Review, among others. In The Guardian, Stephanie Merritt compared the book to a detective story and praised Winkler's journalistic approach to the subject matter. Michael Dirda in The Washington Post praised Winkler's research skills and writing style.

Winkler's book has also received support from anti-Stratfordian organizations such as the De Vere Society, the Shakespeare Oxford Fellowship, and the Shakespearean Authorship Trust.

Slate published a review by Isaac Butler in which he compliments Winkler's writing style and humor but says her arguments quickly fall apart under careful examination. He criticises the book as using rhetoric and strategies similar to other pernicious trutherisms such as climate change denial or anti-vax beliefs. Columnist Oliver Kamm criticized the book for positing a mystery that doesn't exist and lacking precision in the presentation of evidence.

== See also ==
- Emilia Lanier theory of Shakespeare authorship
