= Shakespeare After All =

Discussion of all 38 Shakespeare plays

- 2004 book jacket
- Author: Marjorie Garber
- Subject: Literary Criticism---Shakespeare, William, 1564-1616--Criticism and interpretation--
- Genre: Nonfiction
- Set in: late 16th early 17th century
- Publisher: Pantheon Books
- Publication date: 2004
- Publication place: United States
- Media type: Print, Ebook
- Pages: 989
- ISBN: 0375421904 9780385722148
- OCLC: 1058053957
- Dewey Decimal: 822.3/3
- LC Class: PR2976 .G368 2004
- Website: Official website

Shakespeare After All is a book length work of Shakespearean scholarship, consisting of thirty-eight essays that encompass all thirty-eight of Shakespeare's plays. The book is written by Marjorie Garber and was published in 2004 by Pantheon Books. This learned book is based on 20 years of Garber's lecture courses for undergraduates at Harvard, Haverford and Yale.

== Reception ==
This book has been positively received.

Newsweek's David Gates says: "Until somebody even smarter than Garber comes along with a 1,200 [page book], this is the indispensable introduction to the indispensable writer, [Shakespeare].

The New Yorker says: "[Garber's] introduction is an exemplary account of what is known about Shakespeare and how his work has been read and regarded through the centuries, while the individual essays display scrupulous subtle close reading."

== See also ==
- Shakespeare's plays
- Shakespeare's Ghost Writers
