= Judaeorum =

Judaeorum is Latin for "of [the] Jews". It is contained in the following terms:

- Presbyter Judaeorum was the chief official of the Jews of England prior to the Edict of Expulsion
- Salve Deus Rex Judaeorum is a volume of poems by English poet Emilia Lanyer published in 1611.
- INRI is an acronym of the Latin Jesus Nazarenus Rex Judaeorum, which translates as "Jesus of Nazareth, King of the Jews."
