= Emilia Lanier =

English poet (1569–1645)

Emilia Lanier / Emilia Lanyer
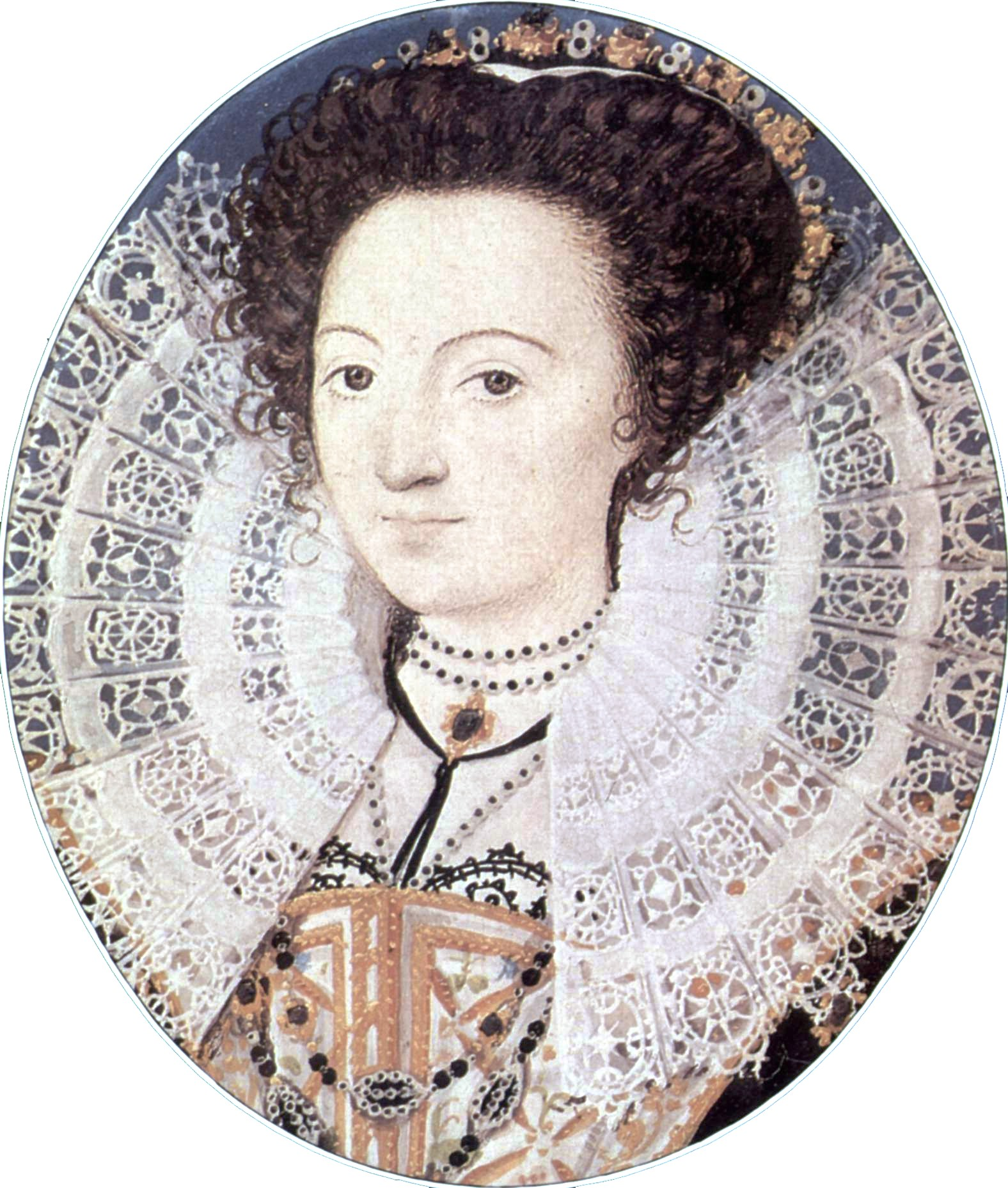
- Portrait by Nicholas Hilliard, suggested to be Lanier
- Born: Aemilia Bassano; 1569; Bishopsgate, London, England
- Died: 1645 (aged 75–76); London, England
- Movement: English Renaissance
- Spouse: Alfonso Lanier (died 1613)
- Parents: Baptiste Bassano; Margaret Johnson

Emilia Lanier (Note: Attested spelling variations include Aemilia or Amelia for the name and Lanyer for the last name.) (née Aemilia Bassano; 1569–1645) was an English writer and poet during the Elizabethan period. Her 1611 volume Salve Deus Rex Judaeorum (Hail, God, King of the Jews) has been seen as protofeminist. She has a claim to be one of the first women poets with a substantial body of commercially-published work in the English language.

Lanier was a contemporary of William Shakespeare, and attempts have been made to identify her with Shakespeare's "Dark Lady" or even with Shakespeare himself. These ideas have inspired several works of fiction with Lanier as a character.

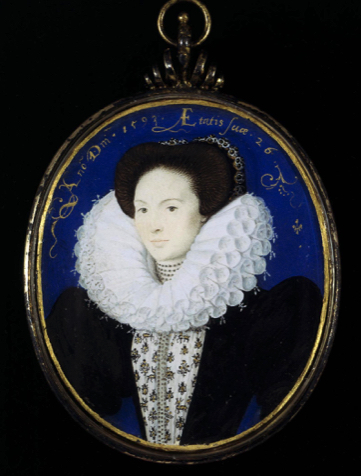
Hilliard Miniature, possibly Lanier

== Biography ==
Emilia Lanier's life appears in her letters, poetry, and medical and legal records, and in sources for the social contexts in which she lived. Researchers have found interactions with Lanier in astrologer Dr Simon Forman's (1552–1611) professional diary, the earliest known casebook kept by an English medical practitioner. She visited Forman many times in 1597 for consultations that incorporated astrological readings, as was usual in the medical practice of the period. The evidence from Forman is incomplete and sometimes hard to read (Forman's poor penmanship has caused critical problems to past scholars). However, his notes show she was an ambitious woman keen to rise into the gentry class.

=== Early life ===
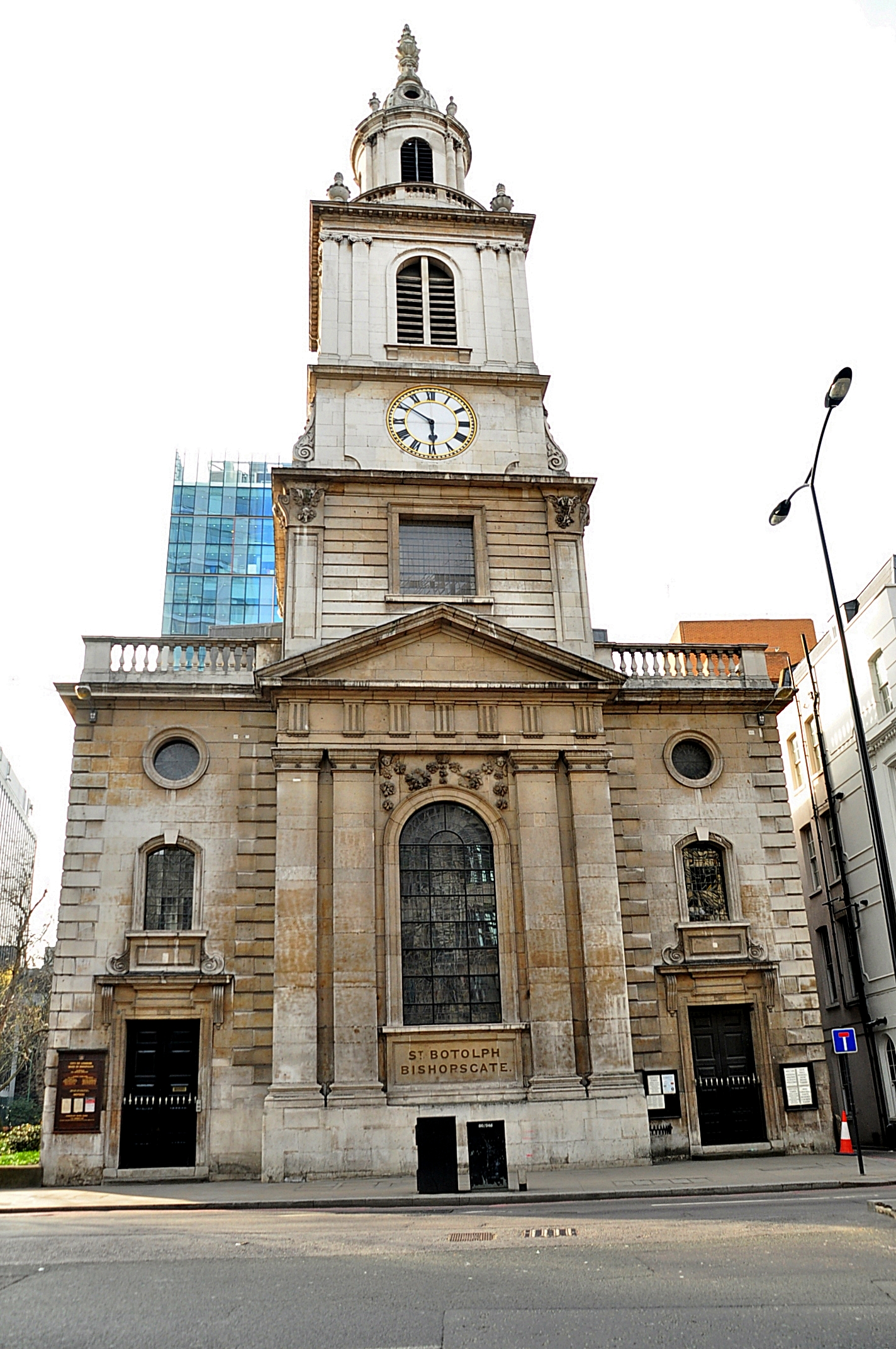
St Botolph-without-Bishopsgate

Church records show Lanier was baptised Aemilia Bassano at the parish church of St Botolph, Bishopsgate, on 27 January 1569.

Lanier was born Aemilia Bassano in London in 1569. Her father, Baptiste Bassano, was an Italian musician from Venice, who was part of a family originally from Bassano del Grappa, a small town in the Veneto region of northern Italy, whose members later moved to Venice before coming to England as court musicians for Henry VIII. Her mother, Margaret Johnson, was an Englishwoman, possibly the aunt of court composer Robert Johnson. She died when Aemilia was 18. Lanier's sister, Angela Bassano, married Joseph Hollande in 1576, but neither of her brothers, Lewes and Phillip, reached adulthood.

Some scholars have suggested that the Bassano family may have had Sephardic Jewish ancestry originating in Spain, although this remains debated and has not been conclusively established. Susanne Woods calls the evidence for it "circumstantial but cumulatively possible". Leeds Barroll says Lanier was "probably a Jew", her baptism being "part of the vexed context of Jewish assimilation in Tudor England."

Baptiste Bassano died on 11 April 1576, when Emilia was seven years old. His will instructed his wife that he had left young Emilia a dowry of £100, to be given to her when she turned 21 or on the day of her wedding, whichever came first. Forman's records indicate that Bassano's fortune might have waned before he died, which caused considerable unhappiness.

Forman's records also indicate that after the death of her father, Lanier went to live with Susan Bertie, Countess of Kent. Some scholars question whether Lanier went to serve Bertie or be fostered by her, but there is no conclusive evidence for either possibility. It was in Bertie's house that Lanier was given a humanist education and learnt Latin. Bertie greatly valued and emphasised the importance of girls receiving the same level of education as young men. This probably influenced Lanier and her decision to publish her writings. After living with Bertie, Lanier went to live with Margaret Clifford, Countess of Cumberland and Margaret's daughter, Lady Anne Clifford. Dedications in Lanier's own poetry seem to confirm this information.

Lanier's mother died when Lanier was 18. Church records show that Johnson was buried in Bishopsgate on 7 July 1587.

=== Adulthood ===
Not long after her mother's death, Lanier became the mistress of Henry Carey, 1st Baron Hunsdon, a Tudor courtier and cousin of Queen Elizabeth I. At the time, Lord Hunsdon was Elizabeth's Lord Chamberlain and a patron of the arts and theatre, but he was 45 years older than Lanier, and records show he gave her a pension of £40 a year. Records indicate that Lanier enjoyed her time as his mistress. An entry from Forman's diary reads, "[Lanier] hath bin married 4 years/ The old Lord Chamberlain kept her longue She was maintained in great pomp ... she hath 40£ a yere & was welthy to him that married her in monie & Jewells."

In 1592, when she was 23, Lanier became pregnant with Hunsdon's child, but he paid her off with a sum of money. Lanier was then married to her first cousin once removed, Alfonso Lanier. He was a Queen's musician; church records show the marriage taking place at St Botolph's Aldgate on 18 October 1592. In 1593 Lanier gave birth to a son, Henry (died 1633).

Forman's diary entries imply that Lanier's marriage was unhappy. The diary also relates that Lanier was happier as Lord Hunsdon's mistress than as Alfonso's bride, for "a nobleman that is ded hath Loved her well & kept her and did maintain her longe but her husband hath delte hardly with her and spent and consumed her goods and she is nowe... in debt." Another of Forman's entries states that Lanier told him about having several miscarriages. Lanier gave birth to a daughter, Odillya, in 1598; she died when she was ten months old and was buried at St Botolph's.

Sometime in the period 1598-1609 Lanier and her husband moved to Hackney, but precisely where or for how long is not known.

In 1611, Lanier published her volume of poetry, Salve Deus Rex Judaeorum. Lanier was the first woman in England to declare herself a poet. People who read her poetry considered it radical, and many scholars today refer to its style and arguments as protofeminist.

=== Older years ===
After her husband's death in 1613, Lanier supported herself by running a school. She rented a house from Edward Smith to house her students, but disputes over the rental led to her being arrested twice between 1617 and 1619. Parents then proved unwilling to send their children to a woman with a history of arrest and Lanier's aspirations of running a prosperous school came to an end.

Lanier's son eventually married Joyce Mansfield in 1623; they had two children, Mary (1627) and Henry (1630). Henry Carey died in October 1633. Later court documents imply that Lanier may have been providing for her two grandchildren after their father's death.

Little else is known of Lanier's life between 1619 and 1635. Court documents state that she sued her husband's brother, Clement, for money owed to her from the profits of one of her late husband's financial patents. The court ruled in Lanier's favour, requiring Clement to pay her £20. Clement could not pay immediately, and so Lanier brought the suit back to court in 1636 and in 1638. There are no records to say whether Lanier was ever paid in full, but at the time of her death, she was described as a "pensioner", i. e. someone who has a steady income or pension.

Lanier died at the age of 76 and was buried at Clerkenwell, on 3 April 1645.

== Poetry ==
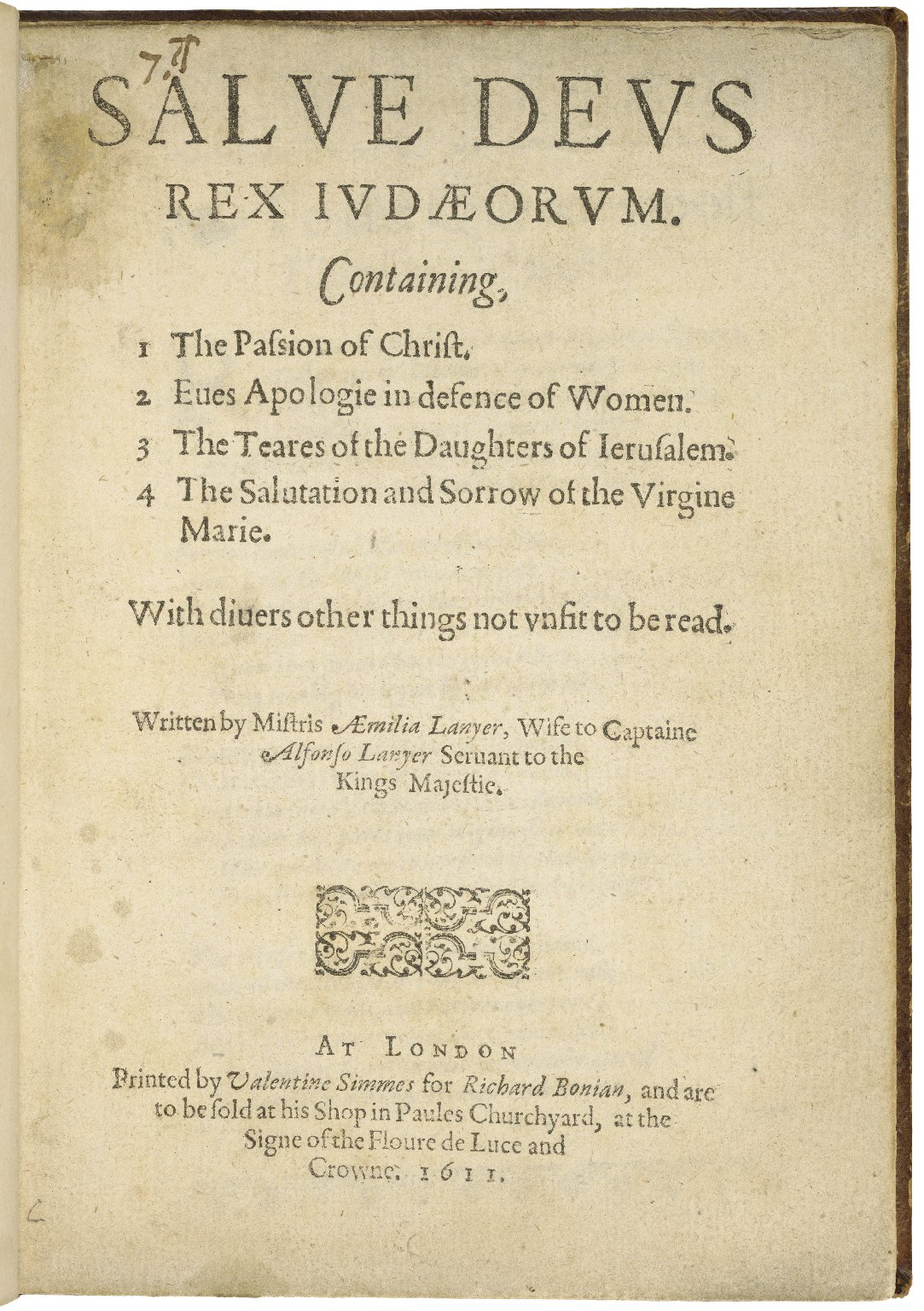
The title page of Lanier's collection of poetry, Salve Deus Rex Judaeorum.

In 1611, at the age of 42, Lanier published a collection of poetry called Salve Deus Rex Judaeorum (Hail, God, King of the Jews). At the time it was still highly unusual for an Englishwoman to publish, especially in an attempt to make a living.

Lanier was only the fourth woman in the British Isles to publish poetry. Previously, Isabella Whitney had published a 38-page pamphlet of poetry partly written by her correspondents, Anne Dowriche, who was Cornish, and Elizabeth Melville, who was Scottish.

Lanier's book is the first book of substantial, original poetry written by an Englishwoman. She wrote it in the hope of attracting a patron. It was also the first potentially feminist work published in England, as all the dedications are to women and the title poem "Salve Deus Rex Judaeorum", about the crucifixion of Christ, is written from a woman's point of view. Her poems advocate and praise female virtue and Christian piety, but reflect a desire for an idealised, classless world.

=== Influences ===
Source analysis shows that Lanier draws on work that she mentions reading, including Edmund Spenser, Ovid, Petrarch, Chaucer, Boccaccio, Agrippa, as well as protofeminists like Veronica Franco and Christine de Pizan. Lanier makes use of two unpublished manuscripts and a published play translation by Mary Sidney, Countess of Pembroke. She also shows a knowledge of stage plays by John Lyly and Samuel Daniel. The work of Samuel Daniel informs her Masque, a theatrical form identified in her letter to Mary Sidney and resembling the Masque in The Tempest.

=== Poems ===
The title poem "Salve Deus Rex Judæorum" is prefaced by ten shorter dedicated poems, all for aristocratic women, beginning with the Queen. There is also a prose preface addressed to the reader, containing a vindication of "virtuous women" against their detractors. The title poem, a narrative work of over 200 stanzas, tells the story of Christ's passion satirically and almost entirely from the point of view of the women who surround him. The title comes from the words of mockery supposedly addressed to Jesus on the Cross. The satirical nature of the poem was first emphasised by Boyd Berry. Although the topics of virtue and religion were seen as suitable themes for women writers, Lanier's title poem has been viewed by some modern scholars as a parody of the Crucifixion, since Lanier approaches it with imagery of the Elizabethan grotesque, found, for instance, in some Shakespeare plays. Her views have been interpreted as "independent of church tradition" and heretical. Other scholars including A. L. Rowse view Lanier's conversion as genuine and her passionate devotion to Christ and to his mother as sincere. Still, comparisons have been made between Lanier's poem and religious satires that scholars have studied in Shakespearean works, including the poem The Phoenix and the Turtle and many of the plays.

In the central section of Salve Deus Lanier takes up the Querelle des Femmes by redefining Christian doctrine of "The Fall", and attacking Original Sin, which is the foundation of Christian theology and Pauline doctrine about women causing it. Lanier defends Eve and women in general by arguing that Eve is wrongly blamed for Original Sin, while no blame attached to Adam. She argues that Adam shares the guilt, as he is shown in the Bible as being stronger than Eve, and so capable of resisting the temptation. She also defends women by noting the dedication of Christ's female followers in staying with him through the Crucifixion and first seeking him after the burial and Resurrection.

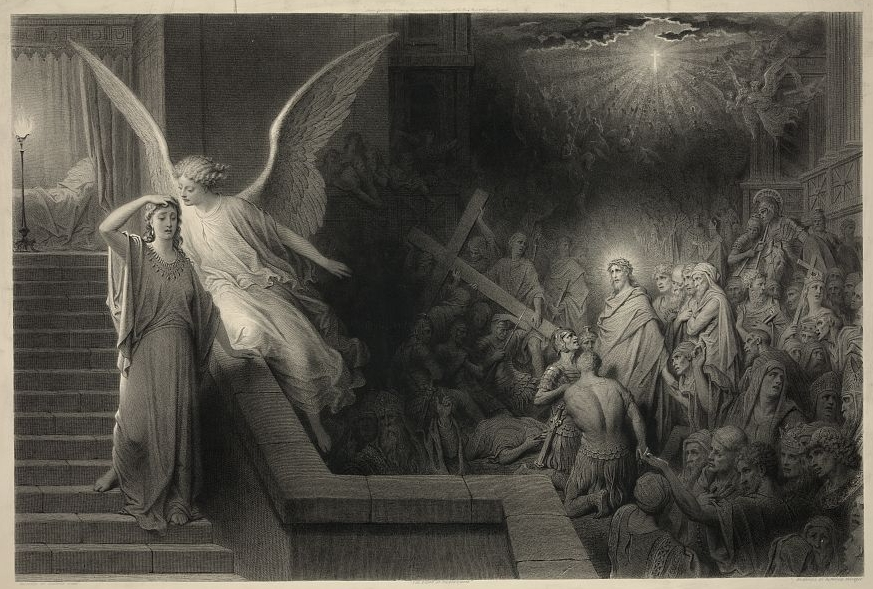
"Le Rêve de la femme de Pilate" (The dream of Pilate's wife). Engraving by Alphonse François (1814–1888) after Gustave Doré.

In Salve Deus, Lanier also draws attention to Pilate's wife, a minor character in the Bible, who attempts to prevent the unjust trial and crucifixion of Christ. She also notes the male apostles that forsook and even denied Christ during His Crucifixion. Lanier repeats the anti-Semitic aspects of the Gospel accounts: hostile attitudes towards the Jews for not preventing the Crucifixion – such views were the norm for her period.

There is no scholarly consensus on the religious motivation of the title poem. Some call it a genuinely religious poem from a strong, female angle. Others see it as a piece of clever satire. Although there is no agreement on intent and motive, most scholars note the strong feminist sentiments throughout Salve Deus Rex Judæorum.

Lanier's book ends with the "Description of Cookham," commemorating Margaret Clifford, Countess of Cumberland and her daughter Lady Anne Clifford. This is the first published country-house poem in English (Ben Jonson's better known "To Penshurst" may have been written earlier but was first published in 1616.) Lanier's inspiration came from a stay at Cookham Dean, where Margaret Clifford, Countess of Cumberland, lived with her daughter Lady Anne Clifford, for whom Lanier was engaged as tutor and companion. The poem is notable for its arresting use of similes. The Clifford household possessed a significant library, some of which can be identified in the painting The Great Picture, attributed to Jan van Belcamp. Helen Wilcox asserts in her book, 1611: Authority, Gender, and the Word in Early Modern England, that the poem is an allegory of the expulsion from Eden.

=== Feminist themes ===
Salve Deus Rex Judaeorum has been viewed by many as one of the earliest feminist works in English literature. Academic Barbara Kiefer Lewalski calls Lanier "defender of womankind" in the article "Writing Women and Reading the Renaissance". Lewalski believes Lanier initiates her ideas of the genealogy of women with the first few poems in the collection, as dedications to prominent women. This follows the idea that "virtue and learning descend from mothers to daughters."

Academic Marie H. Loughlin argues that Lanier advocates the importance of knowledge of the spiritual and the material worlds in women's connection, and that Lanier seems to argue that women must focus on the material world and their importance in it, to complement their life in the spiritual world.

== Shakespearean theories ==
The Chandos portrait, likely depicting Shakespeare, c. 1611

=== Dark Lady ===
==== Sonnets ====
Some have speculated that Lanier was Shakespeare's "Dark Lady". The identification, first proposed by historian A. L. Rowse, has been repeated by several authors since. It appears in David Lasocki and Roger Prior's book The Bassanos: Venetian Musicians and Instrument makers in England 1531–1665 (1995) and in the research of independent Shakespeare scholar Stephanie Hopkins Hughes. Although the colour of Lanier's hair is not known, records exist of her Bassano cousins being referred to as "black", a common term at the time for brunettes or people with Mediterranean colouring. Since she came from a family of Court musicians, she fits Shakespeare's picture of a woman playing the virginal in Sonnet 128. Shakespeare claims that the woman was "forsworn" to another in Sonnet 152, which has been speculated to refer to Lanier's relations with Shakespeare's patron, Lord Hunsdon. The theory that Lanier was the Dark Lady is doubted by other Lanier scholars, such as Susanne Woods (1999). Lewalski notes that Rowse's theory has deflected attention from Lanier as a poet. However, Martin Green argued that although Rowse's argument was unfounded, he was correct in saying that Lanier is referred to in the Sonnets.

Playwrights, musicians and poets have also expressed views. The theatre historian and playwright Andrew B. Harris wrote a play, The Lady Revealed, which chronicles Rowse's identification of Lanier as the "Dark Lady". After readings in London and at the Players' Club, it received a staged reading at New Dramatists in New York City on 16 March 2015. In 2005, the English conductor Peter Bassano, a descendant of Lanier's brother, suggested she provided some of the texts for William Byrd's 1589 Songs of Sundrie Natures, dedicated to Lord Hunsdon, and that one of the songs, a setting of the translation of an Italian sonnet "Of Gold all Burnisht", may have been used by Shakespeare as the model for his parodic Sonnet 130: My mistress' eyes are nothing like the sun. The Irish poet Niall McDevitt also believes Lanier was the Dark Lady: "She spurned his advances somewhere along the line and he never won her back.... It's a genuine story of unrequited love." Tony Haygarth has argued that a certain 1593 miniature portrait by Nicholas Hilliard depicts Lanier.

==== Plays ====
John Hudson points out that the names Emilia in Othello and Bassanio in The Merchant of Venice coincide with mentions of a swan dying to music, which he sees as a standard Ovidian image of a great poet. He asserts that the "swan song" may be a literary device used in some classical writings to conceal the name of an author. However, the notion that a dying swan sings a melodious "swan song" was proverbial, and its application to a character need not prove the character is being presented as a poet. So the evidence remains inconclusive and perhaps coincidental.

Furthermore, Prior argues that the play Othello refers to a location in the town of Bassano, and that the title of the play may refer to the Jesuit Girolamo Otello from the town of Bassano.

Hudson further believes that another "signature" exists in Titus Andronicus, where an Aemilius and a Bassianus each hold a crown. Each mirrors the other's position at the beginning and end of the play, as rhetorical markers indicating that the two names are a pair, and book-end the bulk of the play.

In November 2020, Peter Bassano, a descendant of Lanier's uncle, published a book, Shakespeare and Emilia, claiming to have found proof that Lanier is Shakespeare's Dark Lady. Bassano points to the similarity of Hilliard's alternative miniature to a description of Lord Biron's desired wife in Love's Labour's Lost: "A whitely wanton, with a velvet brow. With two pitch balls stuck in her face for eyes."

=== Authorship ===
The Emilia Lanier theory of Shakespeare authorship contends that Lanier is the actual author of at least part of the plays and poems attributed to William Shakespeare. As is the case with the dozens of other candidates suggested to be the author of Shakespeare's works, this idea is not accepted by the large majority of Shakespeare scholars. In 2008, John Hudson, scholar and theatre producer, introduced the idea that Lanier wrote the works of Shakespeare. Hudson found similarities between the works of Shakespeare and Salve Deus Rex Judaeorum. He also noted her educated background and cosmopolitan upbringing as support of the idea. Her family included several musicians, and Hudson argued that musical references in Shakespeare's plays occur three times as often as in comparable works. The idea would receive some further support from writers including reporter Elizabeth Winkler and feminist novelist Jodi Picoult.

== Legacy ==
Lanier was largely forgotten for centuries, but study of her has increased in recent decades. She is remembered for contributing to English literature her volume of verses Salve Deus Rex Judaeorum, for which she is seen as the first professional female poet in the English language. She is further noted as one of England's first proto-feminist writers in any form, and for her potential roles in Shakespearean myth. The Shakespearean troupe The Dark Lady Players is named in reference to the supposed connections between the two writers.

=== In fiction ===
Several novels have included Lanier as a character, inspired by the Dark Lady and Shakespeare authorship ideas. Examples include: Sally O'Reilly's Dark Aemilia: A Novel of Shakespeare's Dark Lady (2014), Mary Sharratt's The Dark Lady's Mask (2016), Charlene Ball's Dark Lady: A Novel Of Emilia Bassano Lanyer (2017), Sandra Newman's The Heavens (2019) and Jodi Picoult's By Any Other Name (2024).

Lisa Mordente was nominated for a Tony Award for her performance as "Bossano" in the 1981 musical Marlowe. The play Emilia by Morgan Lloyd Malcolm, produced in London in 2018, is a "mock history" piece with a feminist message, in which Lanier rebukes Shakespeare for "lift[ing] her words".

Lanier appears as a character in the 2019 video game Astrologaster. Montserrat Lombard portrays Lanier in the 2016 sitcom Upstart Crow.

== See also ==
- Isabella Whitney, 16th century English poet

== Sources ==
- Hackney History (1 March 2025), Women From Hackney's History II, London, UK: The Hackney Society, pp. 78–79
- Peter Bassano, Shakespeare and Emilia: The Untold Story . Giustiniani Publications. Kindle Edition.
- David Bevington, Aemilia Lanyer: Gender, Genre, and the Canon. Lexington: University Press of Kentucky, 1998
- John Garrison, 'Aemilia Lanyer's Salve Deus Rex Judaeorum and the Production of Possibility.' Studies in Philology, 109.3, 2012, 290–310
- Martin Green, 'Emilia Lanier IS the Dark Lady' English Studies vol. 87, No.5, October 2006, 544–576
- John Hudson, Shakespeare's Dark Lady: Amelia Bassano Lanier: The Woman Behind Shakespeare's Plays?, Stroud: Amberley Publishing, 2014
- John Hudson, 'Amelia Bassano Lanier: A New Paradigm', The Oxfordian 11, 2008, 65–82
- Stephanie Hopkins Hughes, 'New Light on the Dark Lady' Shakespeare Oxford Newsletter, 22 September 2000
- David Lasocki and Roger Prior, The Bassanos: Venetian Musicians and Instrument makers in England 1531–1665, Aldershot: Scolar Press, 1995
- Peter Matthews, Shakespeare Exhumed: The Bassano Chronicles, Stanthorpe: Bassano Publishing, 2013
- Ted Merwin, "The Dark Lady as a Bright Literary Light", The Jewish Week, 23 March 2007, 56–57
- Giulio M. Ongaro 'New Documents on the Bassano Family' Early Music vol. 20, 3 August 1992, 409–413
- Michael Posner, 'Rethinking Shakespeare' The Queen's Quarterly, vol. 115, no. 2, 2008, 1–15
- Michael Posner, 'Unmasking Shakespeare', Reform Judaism Magazine, 2010
- Roger Prior, 'Jewish Musicians at the Tudor Court' The Musical Quarterly, vol. 69, no 2, Spring 1983, 253–265
- Roger Prior, 'Shakespeare's Visit to Italy', Journal of Anglo-Italian Studies 9, 2008, 1–31
- Michelle Powell-Smith, 'Aemilia Lanyer: Redeeming Women Through Faith and Poetry,' 11 April 2000 on-line at Suite101
- Roger Prior 'Jewish Musicians at the Tudor Court' The Musical Quarterly, vol. 69, no 2, Spring 1983, 253–265
- Ruffati and Zorattini, 'La Famiglia Piva-Bassano Nei Document Degli Archevi Di Bassano Del Grappa,' Musica e Storia, 2 December 1998
- Julia Wallace, 'That's Miss Shakespeare To You' Village Voice, 28 March – 3 April 2007, 42
- Steve Weitzenkorn, Shakespeare's Conspirator: The Woman, The Writer, The Clues, CreateSpace, 2015
- Woods, Susanne (1999). Lanyer: A Renaissance Woman Poet. Oxford University Press. ISBN 978-0-19-535234-4.
