= The Apathists =

The Apathists were a collective of British playwrights who staged plays and happenings in London between March 2006 and March 2007. The events generated a cult following on the London theatre scene. The collective had a festival of their work at the Union Theatre produced by David Luff and were involved in the 2006 Latitude Festival, but their work mainly centred on monthly nights at Theatre503, formerly the Latchmere Theatre.

== Writers ==
- Mike Bartlett went on to become the Pearson Playwright in Residence at the Royal Court Theatre. His play, My Child, had its world premiere at the Theatre Downstairs in an innovative production directed by Sacha Wares. His play, Contractions, another Royal Court production, was presented in an earlier form at Theatre503 for The Apathists. Artefacts won the Old Vic New Voices Award and was premiered at The Bush Theatre before a UK tour and a transfer to Broadway. He won the 2006 Tinniswood Award and the 2006 Imison Award for his radio play, Not Talking, which starred June Whitfield and Richard Briers.
- Duncan Macmillan is the author of Monster, which was produced at the Royal Exchange Theatre as part of the Manchester International Festival. The play won two awards in the inaugural Bruntwood Playwriting Competition and was nominated as Best New Play in the TMA and MEN Awards. He went on to be the Writer in Residence at the Royal Exchange, then Pearson Playwright for Paines Plough. His radio play, I Wish To Apologise For My Part In The Apocalypse, was broadcast on 17 July 2008 on BBC Radio 4 (repeated 14 September 2009) and starred Bill Nighy and Amelia Bullmore.
- Simon Vinnicombe is the author of Time Out Critics Choice, Year 10, at the Finborough Theatre and the BAC. He is currently developing the screenplay of Year 10.
- Morgan Lloyd Malcolm is one third of the comedy group Trippplicate, currently working with the BBC. Her plays Time Trippers and The Receptionists have been performed in Edinburgh and London. Her short play, Leo and Lisa, was performed by Kevin Spacey, Thandiwe Newton and Elliot Cowan at the Palexpo in Geneva. In 2006 she won the Smiffie Award for Best New Comedy. She was commissioned to write Emilia for the Shakespeare's Globe. Her father is Christopher Malcolm.
- Rachel Wagstaff is a theatre and television writer. She is the author of The Soldier and Night Sky, which was performed initially for one night only at the Old Vic Theatre, and featured an all-star cast led by Christopher Eccleston, Saffron Burrows, David Baddiel, Navin Chowdhry, David Warner and Bruno Langley. The performance was in aid of Index on Censorship, a charity that reports on censorship, challenges free expression abuses, and publishes reportage and opinion from around the world.
- Nick Gill is a writer, illustrator and musician. His bands include Fireworks Night and The Monroe Transfer. As well as playing frequent gigs, he has performed at the Royal Court Theatre and Trafalgar Studios on the West End for Paines Plough. His plays include Heaven, Karposi, Cats & Cats & Cats & Cats & Cats and This is Never Going to Work. His play Fiji Land was a finalist for the "Protect The Human" Amnesty International New Writing Award, hosted by Ice and Fire Theatre Company. He is the author of the screenplay Lifted and is supported by the Peggy Ramsay Foundation.

== Directors ==
The Apathists frequently used the same directors, including Lyndsey Turner, Clare Lizzimore, Dan Herd, Elizabeth Freestone, Duncan Macmillan and Lucy Kerbal.

== Actors ==
Performers included Terrence Hardiman, Sara Stewart, Rosie Thomson , Gugu Mbatha-Raw, and John Normington.
