= The Dark Lady Players =

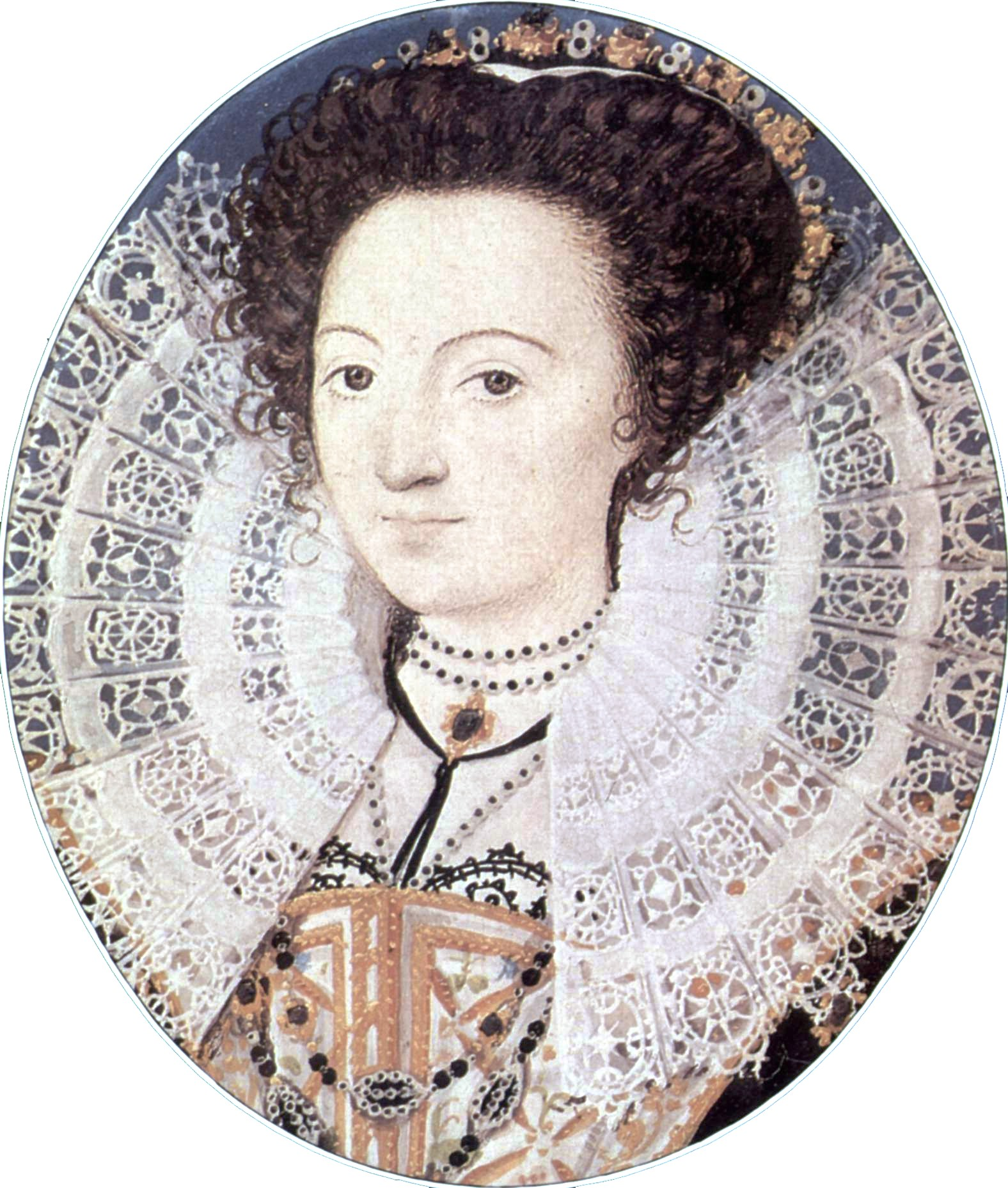
- Portrait miniature of an unknown woman, possibly Emilia Lanier, c. 1590, by Nicholas Hilliard
- Formation: 2007
- Type: Theatre group
- Location: New York City, United States
- Artistic director: John Hudson
- Notable members: Jenny Greeman, Resident Director
- Website: http://www.darkladyplayers.com/

The Dark Lady Players is a New York-based Shakespeare company who perform what they regard as the religious allegories in the Shakespearean plays. In 2007, they performed an allegorical production of A Midsummer Night's Dream at the Abingdon Theater in New York. In 2008, they performed As You Like It: The Big Flush, directed by Stephen Wisker, at the Midtown International Theatre Festival with an entirely female cast interspersing Shakespeare's As You Like It with "cultural and literary references" believed to be included by Emilia Bassano Lanier. On December 15, 2009, they produced a festival at Manhattan Theater Source of short plays written about Lanier by nine New York City playwrights. In September 2011, they presented "nine scenes from Shakespeare, divided into three thematic groups and casts" in the West-Park Presbyterian Church in Upper West Side.

== Foundation ==
Many scholars have noted religious allegories and references in Shakespeare's plays. For example, quotations from the Bible are used in 3,000 places, and 14 different translations are used, as shown by professor Naseeb Shaheen. In a few places the playwright has translated the Book of Genesis using the original Hebrew. In addition, there are many other church and religious references. For example, in 1999 in his study of Julius Caesar, Professor Steve Sohmer argues that the playwright "set out to interrogate the truth of the Gospels". Similarly in 1988 Linda Hoff posited that Hamlet is entirely a religious allegory. According to the study by Peter Milward, King Lear, Antony and Cleopatra, Hamlet, Richard III, Henry VIII all include detailed Apocalypse allegories.

Elizabethan literature routinely used allegories to communicate hidden meanings. Contemporary literary critics advised that instead of feasting on the verse, readers should look beneath the surface to "digest the allegory", as Sir John Harington put it in the introduction to his translation of Orlando Furioso. State Decipherers sitting in audiences attempted to detect hidden meanings in the plays being staged, as recorded by Ben Jonson.

The Dark Lady Players was founded by John Hudson, a Shakespeare scholar most notable for his advocacy of the theory that the works of Shakespeare were written by Emilia Lanier. Hudson received a graduate degree from the Shakespeare Institute at the University of Birmingham, and is currently the artistic director of the Dark Lady Players.

== Allegory in performance ==
In 2007, the Dark Lady Players performed an allegorical production of A Midsummer Night's Dream at the Abingdon Theater in New York. The allegory was based on work by Professor Patricia Parker in her article "Murals and Morals; A Midsummer Night's Dream" (1998). She believes that Pyramus and Thisbe were an allegory for Jesus and the Church, the Wall is the Partition that comes down on the day of Apocalypse, Peter Quince is Saint Peter, and Puck is the Devil. In addition, the production used work by John Hudson, in his 2008 thesis at the Shakespeare Institute of the University of Birmingham, to show the allegorical identity of all the other characters. The result was a consistent religious allegory—but one that was Jewish in nature rather than Christian—because it ends with a Jewish Apocalypse featuring a dew blessing, after the comic re-union in Quince's play-within-the-play ended in the deaths of both protagonists.

In 2008, the Dark Lady Players performed two different versions of As You Like It, which draws on the allegory hypothesized by Richard Knowles. The workshop production was directed by Greeman as part of the Shakespeare Symposium at ManhattanTheaterSource. The subsequent production in summer 2008 at the Midtown International Theatre Festival was directed by the Stephen Wisker. A film was made for Manhattan cable television on the production. The work was presented at Eastern Connecticut State University on 11 November 2009, and their lecture "Who Wrote Shakespeare?" is available at the University website.

On 15 December 2009, at Manhattan Theater Source, they produced a festival of short plays written about Amelia Lanier by nine New York City playwrights. Playwright Bella Poynton was the festival winner, and then commissioned by the company to write a full-length play detailing Lanier's life.

In September 2009, the Dark Lady Players produced a piece titled Shakespeare's Three Marys, directed by Jenny Greeman, which examined the allegorical Mary figures identified in the academic literature by researchers such as Chris Hassel, Linda Hoff, and Steve Sohmer. Extracts from the production were featured in a TV news feature on the Dark Lady Players that was broadcast on The Jewish Channel on September 11, 2009.

In November 2010, The Dark Lady Players produced, an allegorical version of Hamlet at Manhattan Theatre Source in Greenwich Village.

In 2011, the company performed a site-specific museum-style tour of Shakespeare's Gospel Parodies, subtitled "A Medieval Mystery Tour" directed by Jenny Greeman at The Center at West-Park Church, in repertory with the Woodshed Collective's The Tenant. The show featured docents, played by actors, who led audience members on tours through 12 scenes from Shakespeare.

In 2012, the DLP presented a one-night lecture event on Shakespeare's Annunciation Parodies, featuring scenes from Romeo and Juliet, Twelfth Night, Hamlet, and Othello. The Dark Lady Players entered an ensemble piece roughly titled "Shakespeare Flash Mob" for the 2012 Figment Festival and performed a full-length original play by Bella Poynton, Midsummer Madness, in August 2012 at the Central Park Bandshell.

In 2014, the company is performing a version of Othello that suggests the Emilia character is an allegory for Amelia Bassano Lanier, as described in an article in Howlround.

In March 2014, Amberley Publishing is releasing a book "Shakespeare's Dark Lady" which argues the case for Lanier's authorship of these plays as Jewish satires. An advance review in Kirkus Reviews on February 6, 2014 describes it as 'Well-researched, fascinating and thought-provoking'. However, Hudson's theories have not been accepted by Shakespeare scholars.

Some directors anachronistically set the plays at the North Pole or in outer space or in a Mafia village. They therefore destroy and suppress the allusions that the plays contain and make them impossible to discern. I understand why directors who do not understand the plays might resort to such misleading devices. But they should do so no longer, and should use their staging to reveal what the author really meant.

— John Hudson, Shakespeare Institute

== Members ==
Current company members include Director Jenny Greeman, Alexandra Cohler, Mimi Hirt, Elizabeth Weitzen, Emily Hyman, Shykia Fields, Petra Denison and Bella Poynton.
