= Emilia Lanier theory of Shakespeare authorship =

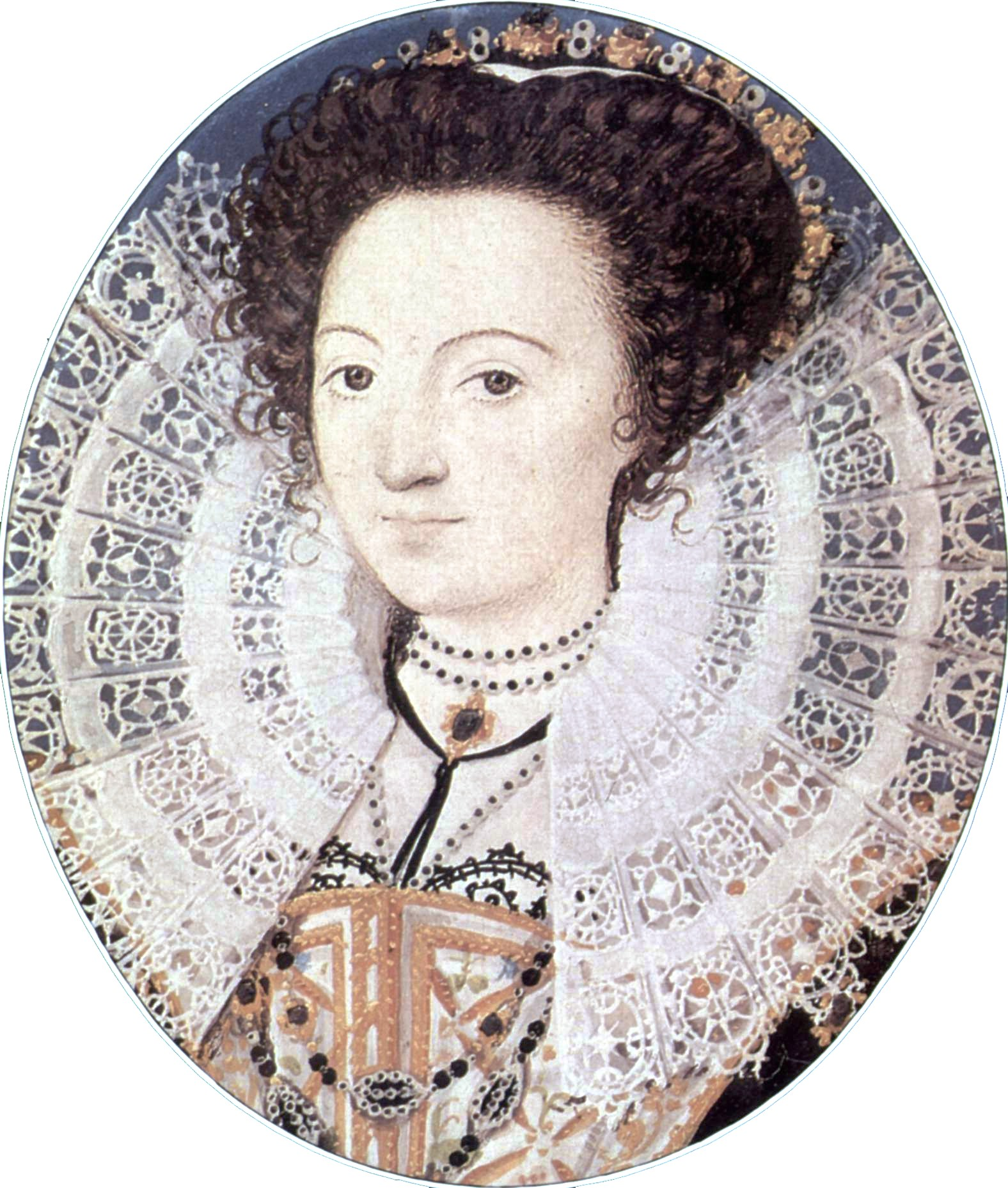
Portrait miniature of an unknown woman, possibly Emilia Lanier Bassano, c. 1590, by Nicholas Hilliard

The Emilia Lanier theory of Shakespeare authorship contends that the English poet Emilia Lanier (née Aemilia Bassano; 1569–1645) is the actual author of at least part of the plays and poems attributed to William Shakespeare. As is the case with the dozens of other candidates purported to be a secret author of Shakespeare's works, this idea is rejected by the large majority of Shakespeare scholars.

== John Hudson ==
In 2007, John Hudson, a theatre producer, amateur Shakespearologist and scholar, introduced the idea that Lanier wrote the works of Shakespeare. Hudson found similarities between the works of Shakespeare and Lanier's poetry book Salve Deus Rex Judaeorum (Latin: Hail, God, King of the Jews). He also noted her educated background and cosmopolitan upbringing as support of the idea. Her family included several musicians, and Hudson argued that musical references in Shakespeare's plays occur three times as often as in comparable works. Other things Hudson points to include that Shakespeare's plays mention falconry several times, which Hudson connects to Lanier's lover Henry Carey, 1st Baron Hunsdon, and that names connected to Lanier appear in The Taming of the Shrew. He also states that Shakespeare's texts include transliterations of Hebrew words.

Hudson published a book on the subject in 2014, Shakespeare's Dark Lady: Amelia Bassano Lanier, The Woman Behind Shakepeare's Plays? Renaissance literature scholar Kate Chedgzoy said in 2010 that "The myth of Aemilia Lanyer as Shakespeare’s Dark Lady both testifies to our continuing cultural investment in a fantasy of a female Shakespeare, and reveals some of the anxieties about difference that haunt canonical Renaissance literature." By 2020, several novels with Lanier as a character had included Hudson's ideas. David McInnis, professor in English and Theatre Studies, said that "The idea that she was known to all these people and that some elaborate conspiracy of virtually everyone of significance in London in the 17th century would 'cover-up' her supposed authorship of Shakespeare's plays is ridiculous." Biographer Jonathan Bate said that Lanier's works have no resemblance to Shakespeare's.

== Other proponents ==
A 2019 essay by reporter Elizabeth Winkler in The Atlantic argued that Shakespeare could have been a woman, and offered Lanier as a candidate, referencing Hudson. Winkler speculated that Lanier and poet Mary Sidney, and perhaps others, could have written Shakespeare's work together. The Atlantic noted that the essay had increased interest in Lanier's life and contemporary women's literary contributions, as well as "generated dissent, most notably the argument that the piece did not pay sufficient attention to the scholarly consensus that any case for anyone other than Shakespeare is conjectural." Author Jug Suraiya called the reactions "a blitzkrieg of bombastic male chauvinist outrage". Winkler commented in 2023 on the reactions to the essay that she had never been attacked like that as a writer. The reactions inspired her to write the book Shakespeare Was a Woman and Other Heresies (2023).

The Atlantic also published comments on Winkler's piece by other writers. Shakespearean James S. Shapiro rejected the idea of Lanier's authorship as one of many similar ideas, saying that "it doesn't follow that because Shakespeare wrote insightfully about women he was one, any more than it does that because Shakespeare saw so penetratingly into the minds of homicides like Macbeth and Claudius he was a murderer, too." Academic Phyllis Rackin said that while she was absolutely certain that women were involved in writing many plays performed in Shakespeare's theater, she was not convinced that there was another "true author" of his works. Biographer David Ellis said that while Lanier hardly has a "pole position" among Shakespeare authorship candidates, she has an advantage over Christopher Marlowe and Edward de Vere in that she didn't die several years before Shakespeare.

Critic Noah Millman opined that "[Winkler's] motivation bears uncomfortably close comparison to that of Confederate sympathizer Mary Preston, who, impressed with the nobility of Othello's character, and unable to believe that a Moor could be so noble, 'corrected' the error she found in Shakespeare’s play, declaring, 'Othello was a white man!'" Bate, in a review of Winkler's book, said that "You can find Bacon, de Vere and Emilia Bassano in Shakespeare not because any of them actually wrote the plays, but because Shakespeare was, as Ben Jonson recognised, the 'Soul of the Age'."

Author Mark Bradbeer argues in the 2022 book Aemilia Lanyer As Shakespeare's Co-Author that several of Shakespeare’s works were co-authored by Lanier. He also suggests that Lanier wrote under other pen-names, including Henry Willobie and George Wilkins, and that her life inspired the plot of several Shakespeare plays. In Aemilia Lanyer as Shakespeare’s Rival Poet (2026) he argues among other things that Lanier co-wrote Shakespeare's sonnets.

According to author Jodi Picoult, Lanier is a good candidate because Shakespeare could not have written proto-feminist characters, and in his time "people in theatre knew that William Shakespeare was a catch-all name for a lot of different types of authors." Picoult was inspired by Winkler's essay, and wrote a novel on the premise of Lanier-as-Shakespeare, the 2024 By Any Other Name. In support of the theory she also suggests that Lanier became the mistress of Henry Carey at age 13, the same age as the character Juliet had in Romeo and Juliet. Novelist Gareth Roberts said that the idea is a great device for a novel, and that "If this was all the jolly wheeze that Picoult suggests, it was a hell of an elaborate and time-consuming one. It also relies heavily on the ability of actors and writers to refrain from spilling the juiciest of gossip."

A 2026 book by feminist historian Irene Coslet, The Real Shakespeare: Emilia Bassano Willoughby, argues for Lanier's authorship. Coslet suggests that Lanier was a black Jewish woman, and that Lanier's authorship has been hidden by "Western-centric and Eurocentric ideology". According to Coslet, "Historians have not managed to explain how the Stratford man, a semi-illiterate moneylender, managed to gain such a level of erudition." She notes that "A-She-Speaker" is an anagram of "Shakespeare", and states that if the Droeshout portrait is folded a certain way, it looks like a painting of Lanier. Matthias Heine, editor of Die Welt, considered Coslet's Shakespeare ideas a left-wing conspiracy theory and blackwashing.

== Other women candidates ==
Other women suggested as authors of Shakespeare's work include Elizabeth I, Shakespeare's wife Anne Hathaway, speculated intended wife Anne Whateley, Mary, Queen of Scots, and Mary Sidney.

== See also ==
- William Shakespeare's collaborations
