= Marjorie Garber =

American academic (1944-)

Marjorie Garber (born June 11, 1944) is an American professor at Harvard University and the author of a wide variety of books, most notably ones about William Shakespeare and aspects of popular culture including sexuality.

== Biography ==
Garber wrote Vested Interests: Cross-Dressing and Cultural Anxiety, a theoretical work on transvestitism's contribution to culture. Other works include Sex and Real Estate: Why We Love Houses, Academic Instincts, Vice Versa: Bisexuality and the Eroticism of Everyday Life, Shakespeare After All, and Dog Love.

Her book Shakespeare After All (Pantheon, 2004) was chosen one of Newsweek′s ten best nonfiction books of the year, and was awarded the 2005 Christian Gauss Book Award from Phi Beta Kappa.

She was educated at Swarthmore College (B.A., 1966; L.H.D., 2004 [honorary]) and Yale University (1969), writing her PhD on dreams in Shakespeare.

Elizabeth Winkler interviewed Garber in Shakespeare Was a Woman and Other Heresies, where Garber described her interest in the characters and reception of the works of William Shakespeare, but distanced herself from colleagues who produced fanciful biographies of the man.

== Bibliography ==
- Vested Interests: Cross-Dressing and Cultural Anxiety. Routledge. 1991. ISBN 978-0-415-90072-0.
- Bisexuality and the Eroticism of Everyday Life. Routledge. 2000. ISBN 978-0-415-92661-4.
- Vice Versa: Bisexuality and the Eroticism of Everyday Life. Simon & Schuster. 1995. ISBN 978-0-684-80308-1.
- Dog Love. Simon & Schuster. 1996. ISBN 978-0-684-81871-9.
- Symptoms of Culture. Routledge. 1998. ISBN 978-0-415-91859-6.
- Sex and Real Estate: Why We Love Houses. Pantheon. 2000. ISBN 978-0-375-42054-2.
- Academic Instincts. Princeton University Press. 2001. ISBN 978-0-691-04970-0.
- Quotation Marks. Routledge. 2002. ISBN 978-0-415-93746-7.
- A Manifesto for Literary Study. University of Washington Press. 2003. ISBN 978-0-295-98344-8.
- Shakespeare After All. Pantheon Books. 2004. ISBN 978-0-375-42190-7.
- Profiling Shakespeare. Routledge. 2008. ISBN 978-0-415-96446-3.
- Patronizing the Arts. Princeton University Press. 2008. ISBN 978-0-691-12480-3.
- Shakespeare and Modern Culture. Pantheon Books. 2008. ISBN 978-0-307-37767-8.
- Shakespeare's Ghost Writers: Literature as Uncanny Causality. Methuen Publishing. 2010. ISBN 978-0-415-87556-1
- The Use and Abuse of Literature. Pantheon Books. 2011. ISBN 978-0-375-42434-2.
- "Lost allusions : the changing codes of P.D. James". Clues : a journal of detection. 44 (1): 58–68. Spring 2026.
