= Morgan Lloyd Malcolm =

British playwright and television writer

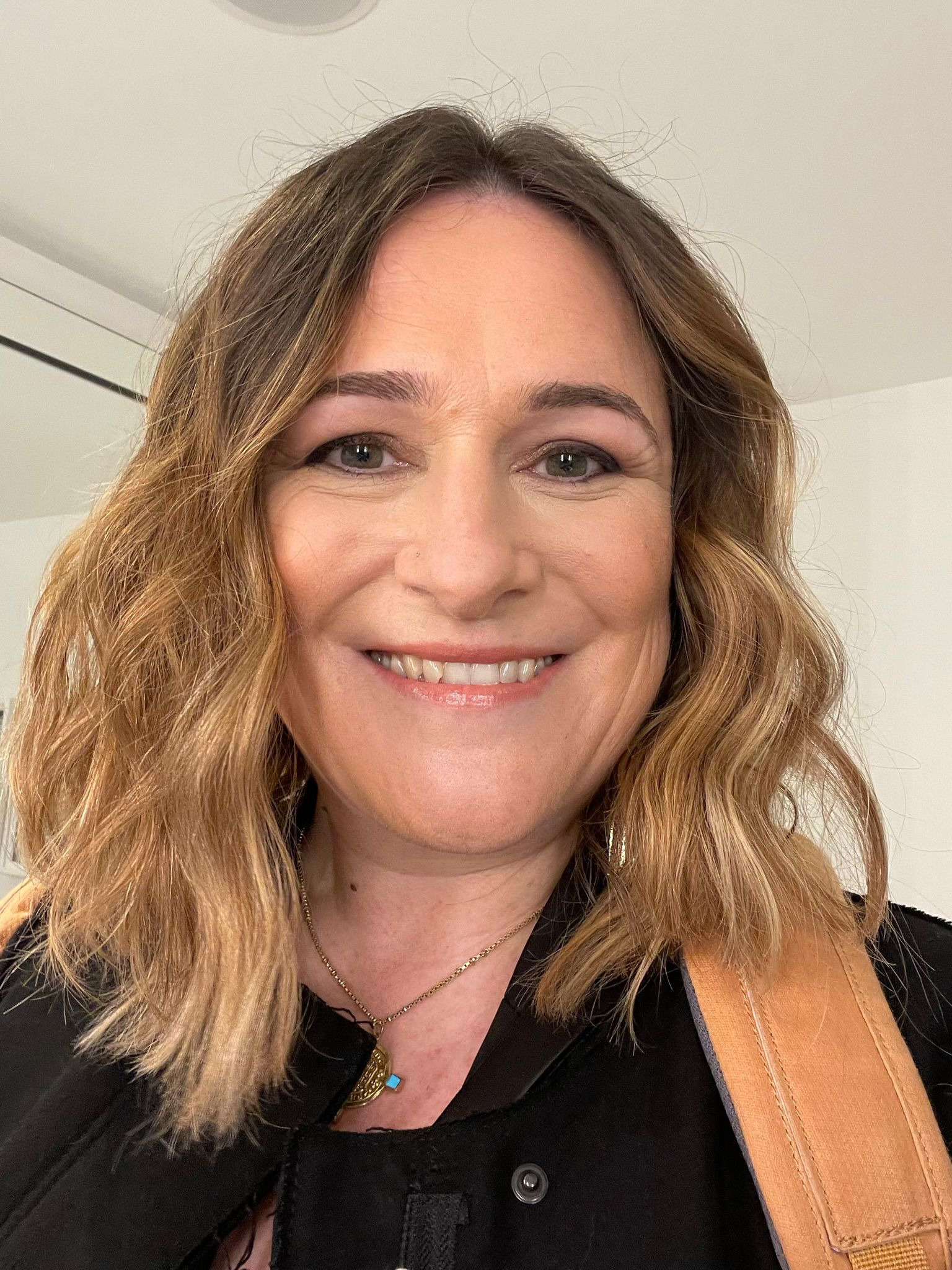
- Morgan Lloyd Malcolm
- Born: 1980 (age 45–46); Westminster, London, England
- Education: Goldsmiths, University of London
- Parent: Christopher Malcolm
- Writing career
- Notable awards: Olivier Award

Morgan Lloyd Malcolm (born 1980) is an Olivier-winning British playwright and screenwriter.

== Early life and education ==
Morgan Lloyd Malcolm was born in Westminster, London, and grew up in London. She is the daughter of actor and West End producer Christopher Malcolm and actress Judy Lloyd. She attended Goldsmiths, University of London.

== Career ==
Malcolm's first play, Fanny and Madge, was produced on the Edinburgh Festival Fringe in 2002 and then transferred to the Old Red Lion in Islington for a three-week run.

Her early career included work with the Bush Theatre (50 Ways to Leave Your Lover at Christmas and Suddenlossofdignity.com, both of which saw five commissioned playwrights creating short pieces and sketches), the Old Vic (as part of Old Vic New Voices), and Hampstead Theatre (an extract from her play Eveline's Circle was performed at Hampstead Theatre's Start Night). She was a member of The Apathists and was also part of comedy troupe Trippplicate, writing and performing shows at Edinburgh. In 2009, the Lyric Hammersmith commissioned her to co-write their Christmas pantomime, Jack and the Beanstalk with Joel Horwood Che Walker and Richard Bean. Malcolm went on to write the Lyric Hammersmith's Christmas pantomime for the next three years with Joel Horwood. In 2020, she received a six-week attachment to the National Theatre Studio, and was commissioned by the Old Vic to co-write a community production.

Her first major stage production, in 2011, was Belongings which debuted at Hampstead Theatre before transferring to the Trafalgar Studios. Other stage play productions include The Wasp (Hampstead Theatre / West End), Emilia (Shakespeare's Globe / West End), Mum (Plymouth Theatre Royal / Soho Theatre) When The Long Trick's Over (HighTide / UK tour), and Typical Girls (Clean Break).

In 2023, she co-wrote the book for Cake, a musical celebrating the life of Marie Antoinette. Cake debuted at the Turbine Theatre before transferring to the West End. It is set to run at The Other Palace in September and October 2024.

Her first screen job was writing for the BBC3 pilot Killing Time, a series set in a women's prison. In 2023, she co-wrote the Netflix erotic thriller series Obsession. A screen adaptation of her stage play The Wasp was released in 2024, directed by Guillem Morales and starring Natalie Dormer and Naomie Harris. Malcolm is currently adapting Emilia for the screen.

In 2023, she was one of twelve screenwriters chosen for the BBC's Spotlight Scheme.

Malcolm co-founded and co-runs the female-led horror-themed theatre company Terrifying Women, alongside playwrights Abi Zakarian and Sampira.

Her plays are published by Methuen and by Nick Hern Books.

== Recognition and honours ==
In 2020, Malcolm won her first Olivier Award, for Emilia (Best Entertainment or Comedy Play), the play also won Best Costume Design and Best Sound Design.

She has previously won a Fringe First Award, a Total Theatre Award for Innovation and Experimentation, and a Smiffie Award for Best Comedy, all for various Edinburgh Fringe Festival shows, also being nominated for the Edinburgh Writing Awards for Best Comedy.

In 2011, she was longlisted for the Charles Wintour Most Promising Playwright Award (in the Evening Standard Theatre Awards) for Belongings.

== Work ==
=== Plays ===
- Fanny and Madge (2003) (premiered at the Gilded Balloon/Edinburgh Fringe before transferring to the Old Red Lion) (Wrote, produced and performed, as part of comedy troupe Trippplicate)
- Maybe We Could..? (2004) (Pleasance/Edinburgh Fringe) (Co-wrote and performed, as part of comedy troupe Trippplicate)
- 13 O'Clock (2006) (Pleasance Jack Dome/Edinburgh) (Co-wrote and performed, as part of comedy troupe Trippplicate)
- New Voices 24 Hour Plays (2006 (Old Vic New Voices)
- Eveline's Circle (2006) (Extract performed at Hampstead Theatre)
- The Boxes (2006) (Barons Court Theatre)
- Emotional Midget (2006) (Underbelly/Edinburgh Fringe)
- The Receptionists (2006) (Pleasance/Edinburgh Fringe) (Co-wrote and performed, as part of comedy troupe Trippplicate)
- Leo and Lisa (2007) (Performed at the Palexpo, Geneva)
- School of Comedy (2007) (Edinburgh Fringe) (Co-wrote, as part of comedy troupe Trippplicate)
- Time Trippers (2007) (Pleasance/Edinburgh Fringe) (Co-wrote and performed, as part of comedy troupe Trippplicate)
- 50 Ways to Leave Your Lover at Christmas (2008) (Bush Theatre, one of four writers)
- Suddenlossofdignity.com (2009) (Bush Theatre, one of five writers)
- Jack and the Bean Stalk (2009) (Lyric Hammersmith)
- Dick Whittington (2010) (Lyric Hammersmith)
- Aladdin (2011) (Lyric Hammersmith)
- Belongings (2011) (premiered at Hampstead Theatre before transferring to Trafalfar Studios)
- You Once Said Yes (2011) (Edinburgh Fringe)
- Epidemic (2012) (Community musical performed in the Old Vic Tunnels)
- Cinderella (2012) (Lyric Hammersmith)
- Short Plays By... Morgan Lloyd Malcolm (2012) (Soho Theatre)
- Not Another Musical (2012) (Look Left, Look Right/Latitude Festival)
- Above and Beyond (2013) (Corinthia Hotel)
- The Many Whoops of Whoops Town (2023) (Look Left, Look Right/Lyric Hammersmith)
- Robin Hood (2013) (Bolton Octagon)
- Once Upon a Christmas (Look Left, Look Right)
- Alice in Wonderland (2014) (Bolton Octagon)
- Edie's Diary (2014)
- Hellscreen (2015) (Vault Festival)
- The Wasp (2015) (premiered at Hampstead Theatre before transferring to Trafalgar Studios)
- Emilia (2018) (premiered at Shakespeare's Globe before transferring to the Vaudeville Theatre)
- Typical Girls (2021) (Sheffield Crucible Theatre)
- Mum (2021) (premiered at the Plymouth Theatre Royal before transferring to Soho Theatre)
- When The Long Trick's Over (2022) (premiered at the New Wolsey Theatre before touring)
- A Christmas Carol (2022) (Rose Theatre, Kingston)
- Cake (2023) (premiered at the Turbine Theatre before tour, West End transfer to the Lyric Theatre, subsequent production at The Other Palace)
- Burnt at the Stake (2023) (Night of short plays at Shakespeare's Globe)
- Dracula (2026) (Lyric Hammersmith)

=== Screenwriting ===
- Like Rabbits (2004) (short film)
- Killing Time (2004) (BBC3 sitcom pilot)
- School of Comedy (2007-2010) (Channel 4 sitcom - contributed various sketches)
- Hotel Trubble (2009) (CBBC)
- Obsession (2023) (Netflix TV series)
- The Wasp (2024) (feature film, adapted from the stage play)
- Emilia (feature film, adapted from the stage play)
