= Emilia (play) =

Play by Morgan Lloyd-Malcolm

- Written by: Morgan Lloyd Malcolm
- Original language: English
- Subject: The life of Emilia Bassano
- Setting: 1609

Premiere
- Date premiered: 10 August 2018
- Place premiered: Shakespeare's Globe, London, England

Emilia is a play by Morgan Lloyd Malcolm inspired by the life of the 17th-century poet Emilia Lanier (née Aemilia Bassano), as well as her speculated role as William Shakespeare's "Dark Lady."

== Synopsis ==
Four hundred years ago, Emilia Bassano wanted her voice to be heard. It wasn't. Could she have been the 'Dark Lady' of Shakespeare's sonnets? What of her own poetry? Why was her story erased from history?

== Production history ==
The play was commissioned for the Shakespeare's Globe where it opened from 10 August 2018 running until 1 September. The production featured an all-female cast and was directed by Nicole Charles.

Following the run at the Globe, the production was announced to transfer into the West End at the Vaudeville Theatre from 8 March 2019. The limited run was due to end on 15 June, however it was announced that it would be closing two weeks early on 1 June 2019.

On 27 June 2019, Nick Hern Books announced that the play was available to be performed by all-female casts in UK educational institutions.

From 4 to 22 March 2020, the play ran as part of the farewell Anthony Harper Pop-up Globe season in Auckland, New Zealand, directed by Miriama McDowell.

In October 2020, it was announced that an archive recording of the 2019 West End production would be available to watch online between 10 and 24 November 2020 to support the theatre industry during the COVID-19 pandemic. This date was later extended to December 2.

In October 2021, a production of the play directed by Karen Tomlin ran for a week at the Barbican Centre's Milton Court Theatre in London.

== Reception ==
The Times gave the play a positive review, saying that while "it needs a rigorous edit and at times its polemic verges on the crude", the 2018 production "has so much wit, fierce intelligence and heady intensity that it’s a wonder it doesn’t set the thatched roof alight. ... you’re sent out into the night with your head spinning and fire in your belly. Incendiary."

== Awards and nominations ==
=== West End production ===
Year	Award Ceremony	Category	Nominee	Result
2019	The Stage Debut Awards	The Joe Allen Best West End Debut	Saffron Coomber	Nominated
2020	Mousetrap Awards	Best Play		Nominated
2020	Mousetrap Awards	Power of the Ensemble		Nominated
2020	Laurence Olivier Award	Best Entertainment or Comedy Play		Won
2020	Laurence Olivier Award	Best Costume Design	Joanna Scotcher	Won
2020	Laurence Olivier Award	Best Sound Design	Emma Laxton	Won

== See also ==
- Emilia Lanier theory of Shakespeare authorship
