= Christopher Malcolm =

Canadian actor and producer (1946–2014)

- Malcolm in The Great Riviera Bank Robbery (1979)
- Born: 19 August 1946; Aberdeen, Scotland, United Kingdom
- Died: 15 February 2014 (aged 67); London, United Kingdom
- Citizenship: Canada; United Kingdom
- Education: University of British Columbia
- Occupations: Actor, director, producer
- Years active: 1968–2011
- Spouse: Judy Malcolm
- Children: 3, including Morgan Lloyd Malcolm

Christopher Malcolm (19 August 1946 – 15 February 2014) was a British-Canadian actor, director, and producer. He first achieved notoriety for his role as Brad Majors in the original stage production of The Rocky Horror Show.

== Early life and education ==
Malcolm was born on 19 August 1946 in Aberdeen to William Malcolm, a farmer, and his wife Paddy English. He was brought up in Canada after his family emigrated to British Columbia in the late 1940s, with his family running a farm in Vernon. He attended the University of British Columbia, where he worked and studied theatre, but later dropped out to co-found the Powerhouse Theatre in Vernon. He moved back to the UK at age 19, living with a grandmother in Essex.

== Career ==
Malcolm began his professional career with the Royal Shakespeare Company (1966–68). He appeared in at least ten productions and worked with directors including Peter Hall, Trevor Nunn and John Barton. Throughout the 1970s, he worked continuously in theatre and film, appearing in many Royal Court productions including the award-winning musical, The Rocky Horror Show creating the role of Brad Majors. He appeared in films including The Empire Strikes Back (as Zev Senesca, the Alliance pilot who locates and rescues the stranded Luke Skywalker and Han Solo on planet Hoth), Reds, Ragtime, Superman III, Labyrinth, and Highlander.

In 1978, Malcolm began his producing career with Pal Joey, which was successfully transferred to the West End in 1980 and was nominated for Best Musical Revival in the Laurence Olivier Awards. He followed this success with the Best Comedy award in 1981 for Nell Dunn's Steaming, which went on to play for two years at the Comedy Theatre and around the world. Other productions in London included Frankie and Johnny, When I Was A Young Girl I Used To Scream And Shout, as well as five Steven Berkoff plays, including Decadence, Greek and Metamorphosis. in 1983 he appeared in Only Fools and Horses as axe murderer Charles Winters. Malcolm also played the role of the café owner in The Comic Strip's 1984 film "A Fistful of Traveller's Cheques".

In 1990, Malcolm co-produced a new production of The Rocky Horror Show at the Piccadilly Theatre, in partnership with Howard Panter of the Ambassador Theatre Group. This Olivier nominated production went on to huge success throughout the UK, enjoying 4 nationwide tours over the next 10 years as well as many productions throughout the world. He oversaw these productions on behalf of The Rocky Horror Company Ltd, a company formed by the producers and the play's author Richard O'Brien to look after this much loved musical. The show finally reached Broadway in 2000 in a Tony Award-nominated production co-produced with Jordan Roth Productions at the Circle in the Square theatre.

Other British productions throughout this time include The Pajama Game, Footloose the Musical, and the award-winning Single Spies written by Alan Bennett which had a very successful year at the Queen's Theatre. He co-produced the world premiere of Flashdance The Musical which premiered at the Plymouth Theatre Royal in 2008, toured the UK and presented at the Shaftesbury Theatre in 2010. The final show he produced was 'Oh! What a Lovely War!' at Stratford East which was directed by Terry Johnson and opened in January 2014 to critical acclaim. He had maintained his interest in acting as well, appearing on 11 episodes of Absolutely Fabulous as Saffy's father, Justin, and in the BBC2 film, Daphne as Nelson Doubleday.

== Personal life ==
Malcolm lived in London with his wife Judy Lloyd, an actress. They had three children, Nell, Morgan, and Marlon. He was close friends with actors Frances and Andy de la Tour.

== Death ==
His daughter Morgan Lloyd Malcolm reported his death from cancer, aged 67, on 15 February 2014, via Twitter.

== Filmography ==
=== Film ===
Year	Title	Role	Notes	Ref.
1968	A Midsummer Night's Dream	Attendant		
1969	The Desperados	Gregg		
1970	Figures in a Landscape	Helicopter Observer		
1971	Welcome to the Club	Pvt. Henry Hoe		
1972	The Adventures of Barry McKenzie	Sean		
1975	The Spiral Staircase	Police Officer		
1977	The Strange Case of the End of Civilization as We Know It	CIA Agent		
1978	Force 10 from Navarone	Rogers		
1979	The Great Riviera Bank Robbery	Serge		
1980	The Empire Strikes Back	Zev Senesca (Rogue 2)		
1980	The Dogs of War	Baker		
1981	Shock Treatment	Vance Parker		
1981	Ragtime	Police Captain		
1981	Reds	Holland		
1983	Superman III	Miner		
1984	Lassiter	Quaid		
1985	King David	Doeg		
1985	Rustlers' Rhapsody	Jud		
1985	Spies Like Us	Jumpmaster		
1986	Highlander	Kirk Matunas		
1986	Labyrinth	Robert		
1987	Eat the Rich	Steinbeck		
1988	Whoops Apocalypse	Gallagher		

=== Television ===
Year	Title	Role	Notes	Ref.
1969	Strange Report	Slaon	1 episode, "Report 3906: Cover Girls - Last Year's Model"	
1971	ITV Playhouse	The first officer	1 episode "The Switch"	
1971	Justice	Farrer	1 episode "People Have Too Many Rights"	
1972	The Protectors	Malloy	1 episode, "Disappearing Trick"	
1973	Diamonds on Wheels	Jock	TV movie	
1973	Harriet's Back in Town	Benjamin Finch	2 episodes	
1974	Disneyland	Jock	3 episodes, "Diamonds on Wheels"	
1975	Thriller	Hank	1 episode, "Won't Write Home Mom – I'm Dead"	
1975	Edward the Seventh	American Attaché	1 episode, "The New World"	
1975	It's a Lovely Day Tomorrow	The Yank	TV movie	
1976	Second Verdict	Mullaly	1 episode, "Lizzie Borden"	
1977	Raffles	Barney Maguire	1 episode, "A Trap to "Catch a Cracksman"	
1980	Play for Today	Matt	1 episode, "Instant Enlightenment Including VAT"	
1980	Oppenheimer	Steve Nelson	2 episodes	
1982	Whoops Apocalypse	Motorcycle Cop	1 episode, "How To Get Rid of It"	
1982	We'll Meet Again	Master Sgt. Mac McGraw	10 episodes	
1982	Beau Geste	Hank	5 episodes	
1983	The Last Day	American at Airport	Television Movie	
1983	Only Fools and Horses	Charles Winters, the Axe Murderer	1 episode, Friday the 14th	
1984–1990	The Comic Strip	Brother-in-law, Cafe Owner	2 episodes	
1986	The Daily Woman	Max Callisher	TV movie	
1986	The Last Days of Patton	Maj. Ken Morgan (Hospital PAO)	TV movie	
1986	The Ted Kennedy Jr. Story	Ben Gibbs	TV movie	
1987	Pulaski	Tony	1 episode, "The Lone Granger"	
1988	War and Remembrance	Bunky Thurston	2 episodes	
1992–94	Firm Friends	Eddie Vincent	2 episodes	
1992–2011	Absolutely Fabulous	Justin	11 episodes	
1994	Lovejoy	Texas Greenberg	1 episode	
1996	Over Here	Murphy	TV movie	
2007	Daphne	Nelson Doubleday	TV movie	

== Partial stage credits ==
Year	Title	Role	Venue	Notes	Ref.
1973-79	The Rocky Horror Show	Brad Majors	Various		
1973-74	Design for Living	Henry Carver	Phoenix Theatre, London		
1981	Mary, Mary	Bob McKellaway	Thorndike Theatre, Leatherhead		
1986	Metamorphosis		Mermaid Theatre, London	Producer	
1986	The Rocky Horror Show	Brad Majors	Ashcroft Theatre, Croydon		
