= To the Queen =

c. 1600 poem praising Queen Elizabeth I often attributed to William Shakespeare

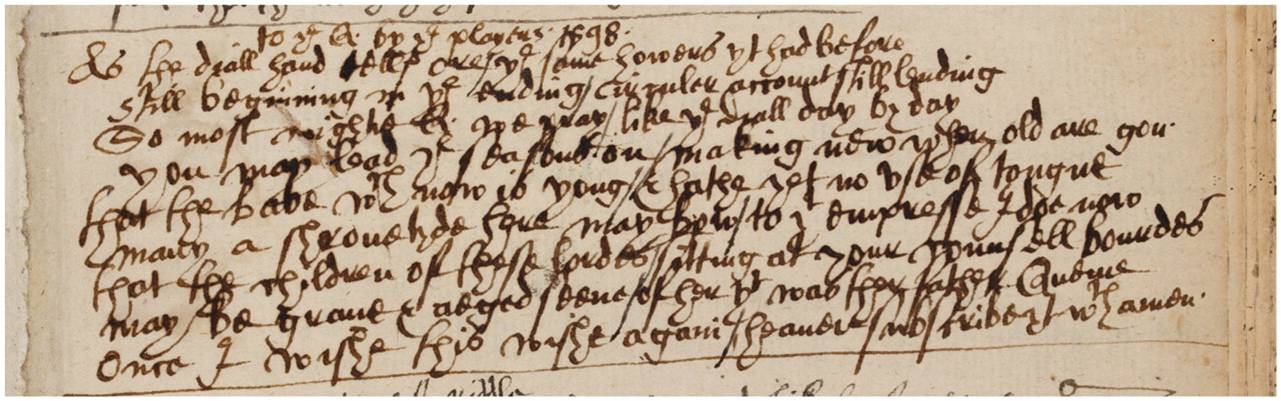
The manuscript of "To the Queen by the Players".

"To the Queen" (or "To The Queen by the players") is a short 18 line poem praising Queen Elizabeth I attributed to William Shakespeare. It was included in 2007 by Jonathan Bate in his complete Shakespeare edition for the Royal Shakespeare Company.

The poem, described by Bate as having been written on "the back of an envelope", was probably composed as an epilogue for a performance of a play in the presence of the queen. Bate believes it was created to be read after As You Like It was given at court on Shrove Tuesday in February 1599. American scholars William Ringler and Steven May discovered the poem in 1972 in the notebook of a man called Henry Stanford, who is known to have worked in the household of the Lord Chamberlain. Other scholars have since contested the attribution to Shakespeare.

== Text ==
The complete poem goes as follows:

As the dial hand tells o'er
The same hours it had before,

Still beginning in the ending,
Circular account still lending,

So, most mighty Queen we pray,
Like the dial day by day

You may lead the seasons on,
Making new when old are gone,

That the babe which now is young
And hath yet no use of tongue

Many a Shrovetide here may bow
To that empress I do now,

That the children of these lords,
Sitting at your council boards,

May be grave and aged seen
Of her that was their fathers' queen.

Once I wish this wish again,
Heaven subscribe it with "Amen".

== Attribution ==
The attribution was first made—tentatively—to Shakespeare by Ringler and May, and was accepted in 2005 by James S. Shapiro, who suggested that it might have been written as an epilogue for a court performance of A Midsummer Night's Dream. He argued that the metre corresponded to Oberon's closing lines and the known published epilogue, spoken by Puck. Juliet Dusinberre later argued that it was more likely to have been used for As You Like It, because it linked with themes in the play. She also suggested that it referred to a sundial in Richmond Palace, where she thinks the play may have been performed. Bate accepted this view and stated that he was "99% certain" that it was by Shakespeare.

However, other scholars disagree. In 2009 Michael Hattaway argued that poem is more likely to be by Ben Jonson, stating that,

The trochaic tetrameters used by Jonson, for example, in the songs from Lord Haddington's wedding masque, performed at court on Shrove Tuesday in 1608, and the satyr songs in his 1611 Masque of Oberon are very close in style to the dial poem and have roughly the same proportion of feminine endings.

He says that Shakespeare and Thomas Dekker are also possible authors. Helen Hackett argued in 2011 that Dekker was the most likely author,

Dekker emerges as the strongest contender, for reasons including his recurrent preoccupation with dials and temporal cycles, his extensive composition of royal panegyric, the strong similarities between the Dial Hand poem and the epilogue to his Old Fortunatus (also performed at court in 1599), and a verbal echo of the Dial Hand poem in his Whore of Babylon (1605).

Hackett states that, unlike Shakespeare, Dekker regularly wrote complimentary verse about Elizabeth and suggests that the poem was intended to be spoken at the end of his play The Shoemaker's Holiday.

== See also ==
- Shakespeare Apocrypha
- Richmond, London – Royal Palace
