= Salve Deus Rex Judaeorum =

1611 volume of poems by Emilia Lanier

Salve Deus Rex Judaeorum (Latin: Hail, God, King of the Jews) is a volume of poems by English poet Emilia Lanier published in 1611. It was the first book of original poetry published by a woman in England. It was also the first book of poetry written by an English woman in an effort to attract a patron. The volume contains several short poems, each dedicated to a different woman, a long title poem Salve Deus Rex Judaeorum and the first English country house poem entitled "The Description of Cooke-ham".

== Poems ==
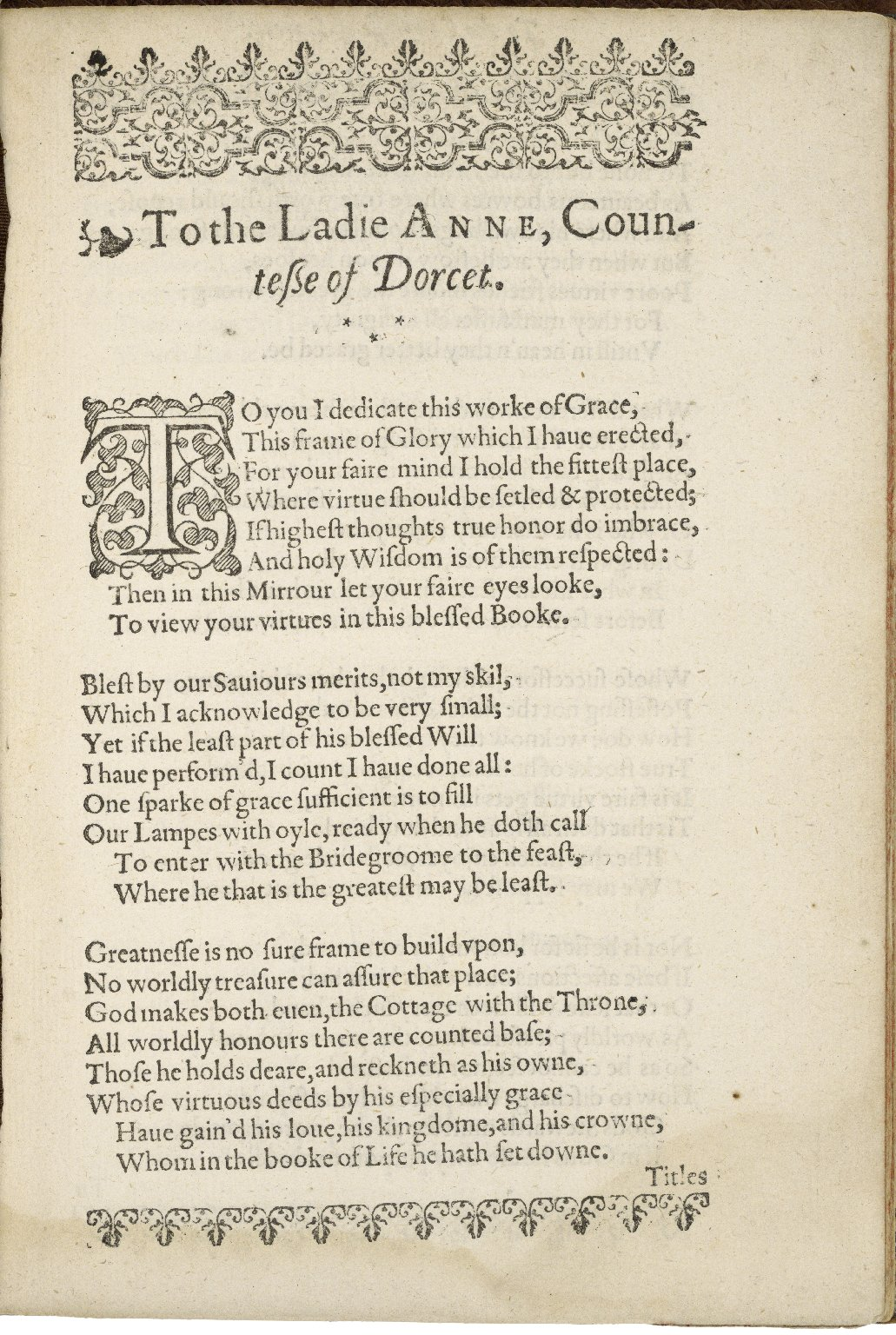
Emilia Lanyer's dedication of her book of poems to Lady Anne Clifford.

=== Contents ===
- Prefatory material:
  - To the Queenes Most Excellent Majestie
  - To the Lady Elizabeths Grace
  - To All Vertuous Ladies in Generall
  - To the Ladie Arabella
  - To the Ladie Susan
  - The Authors Dream to the Lady Marie
  - To the Ladie Lucie
  - To the Ladie Margaret
  - To the Ladie Katherine
  - To the Ladie Anne
  - To the Vertuous Reader (prose)
- Salve Deus Rex Judaeorum:
1. The passion of Christ
2. Eues Apologie in defence of Women.
3. The Teares of the Daughters of Ierusalem.
4. The Salutation and Sorrow of the Virgine Marie
- The Description of Cooke-ham
- To the Doubtfull Reader (prose)

=== Description ===
As their titles suggest, the ten prefatory poems were each dedicated to a woman Lanier was inspired by, influenced by, or hoped to attract as a patron. These dedications were used to "assert the dignity and merit of all women" by declaring the greatness of the women she wrote to.

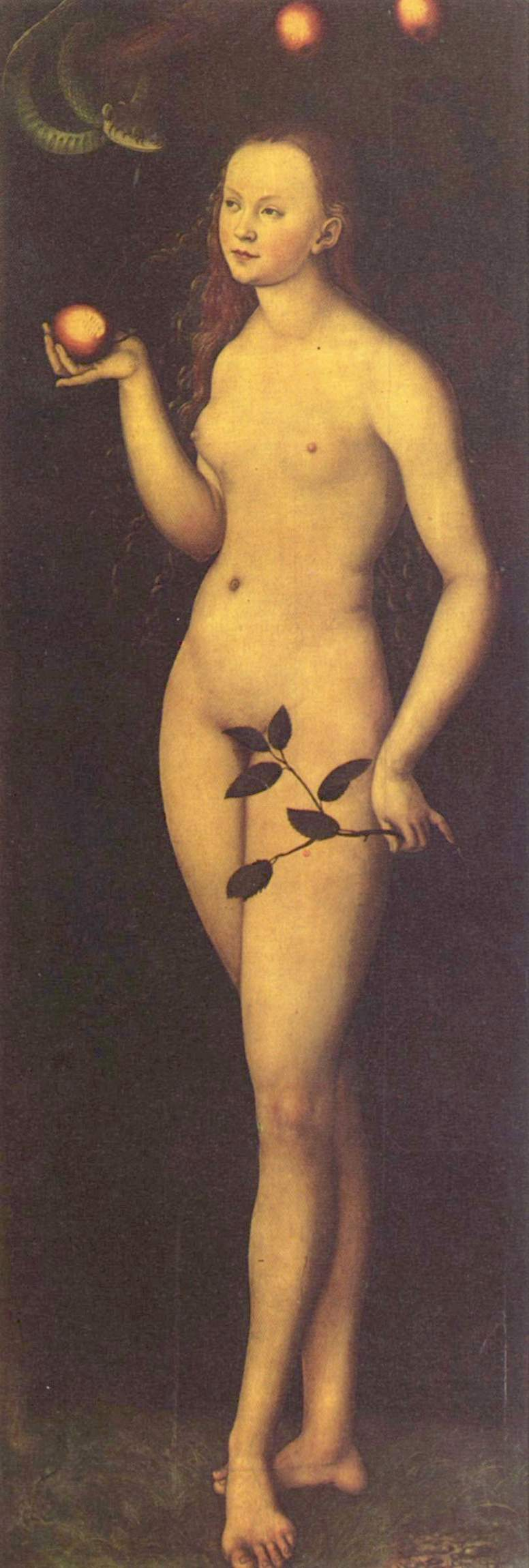
Eve by Lucas Cranach the Elder, 1528

The title poem is a significantly longer work that focuses on the crucifixion of Jesus, a defence of women, and the importance of woman in the Biblical crucifixion narrative. Suzanne Woods observes that the poem is "meditating and expanding on the events from the female point of view," which was a revolutionary retelling of the crucifixion at the time.

Lanier's defense of women shifts the blame of sin from Eve and onto Adam saying, "But surely Adam cannot be excus'd, / Her fault, though great, yet he was most too blame" The poem goes on to explain that Adam should have avoided temptation since he is depicted as stronger than Eve in the Bible. Lanier strengthens her defence of women by praising the women in the crucifixion story who stood behind Jesus when his disciples forsook him. For example, Lanier's focus on Pilate's wife, a woman who attempts to persuade her husband not to crucify Jesus, shows Lanier's dedication to the recognition of women in the Bible even if they are nameless. Lanier's attention to the women in the poem characterizes her unique retelling of the biblical story.

=== Reception ===
There is no indication of any recognition of Salve Deus Rex Judaeorum in Lanier's lifetime. It did not gain Lanier a fortune as her attempt to attract a patron suggests she wanted. The collection appears to have had an underwhelming reception due to the nontraditional nature of the poems. The British Library explains the writing by stating, "Lanier uses the language of piety and respect to mount a radical, self-assured 'defence of Women'. The feminist style that scholars and researchers like those at the British Library attribute to Lanier is probably one of the reasons “Salve Deus Rex Judaeorum" was not well received.

Lanier's Salve Deus Rex Judaeorum was, for the most part, forgotten for centuries. One scholar says, "["Salve Deus Rex Judeaorum" was] consigned to oblivion for nearly four centuries, Lanyer has only in recent decades become the focus of a significant body of critical scholarship and achieved a presence in the mainstream of Renaissance poetry."

Although the reception to Salve Deus Rex Judaeorum was poor, the work has come to claim an important place in the history of English literature. Most scholars, researchers, and biographers consider Lanier's collection of poems as a groundbreaking text for feminism, literary tradition, and poetry overall. Though not widely studied for centuries, the book has achieved recognition thanks to carefully edited editions like that of Suzanne Woods and journal articles including "Remembering Aemilia Lanyer" by Kate Chedgzoy.

== See also ==
- Emilia Lanier theory of Shakespeare authorship
