= Shakespeare's Ghost Writers =

Book about Shakespeare's influence

Shakespeare's Ghost Writers: Literature as Uncanny Causality
- Title page for Shakespeare's Ghost Writers: Literature as Uncanny Causality (1987)
- Author: Marjorie Garber
- Language: English
- Genre: Non-fiction
- Publisher: Methuen Publishing
- Publication date: 1987

Shakespeare's Ghost Writers: Literature as Uncanny Causality is a nonfiction book written by Marjorie Garber and originally published by Methuen Publishing in 1987.

== Synopsis ==
This book decentralizes Shakespeare from his normally central position in the literary tradition. Instead the book traces the ubiquity and influence of Shakespeare's text on our culture in post-modern England and America, as well as Shakespeare's textual effect on some influential minds of the twentieth century. In this way, it says, Shakespeare or Shakespeare's ghost metaphorically haunts us.

== Reception ==
This book has received positive reviews.

Margreta de Grazia writing for the Shakespeare Quarterly says: "Shakespeare’s Ghost Writers" is a brave new book, for in justifying another new book about Shakespeare, it has attempted nothing less than to make literature newly consequential."

Jonathan Gil Harris, in Shakespeare and Literary Theory says: "[Garber's] book 'Shakespeare’s Ghost Writers'...remains the most thoughtful and thought-provoking account of Shakespeare’s ‘uncanny causality’ and the ways in which theorists, even when they criticize canonical authority, repeatedly turn to Shakespeare to lend authority to their critique. Shakespeare’s Ghost Writers was the first sustained study of ‘Shakespearean theory’; it remains the best."
