= List of works by William Shakespeare =

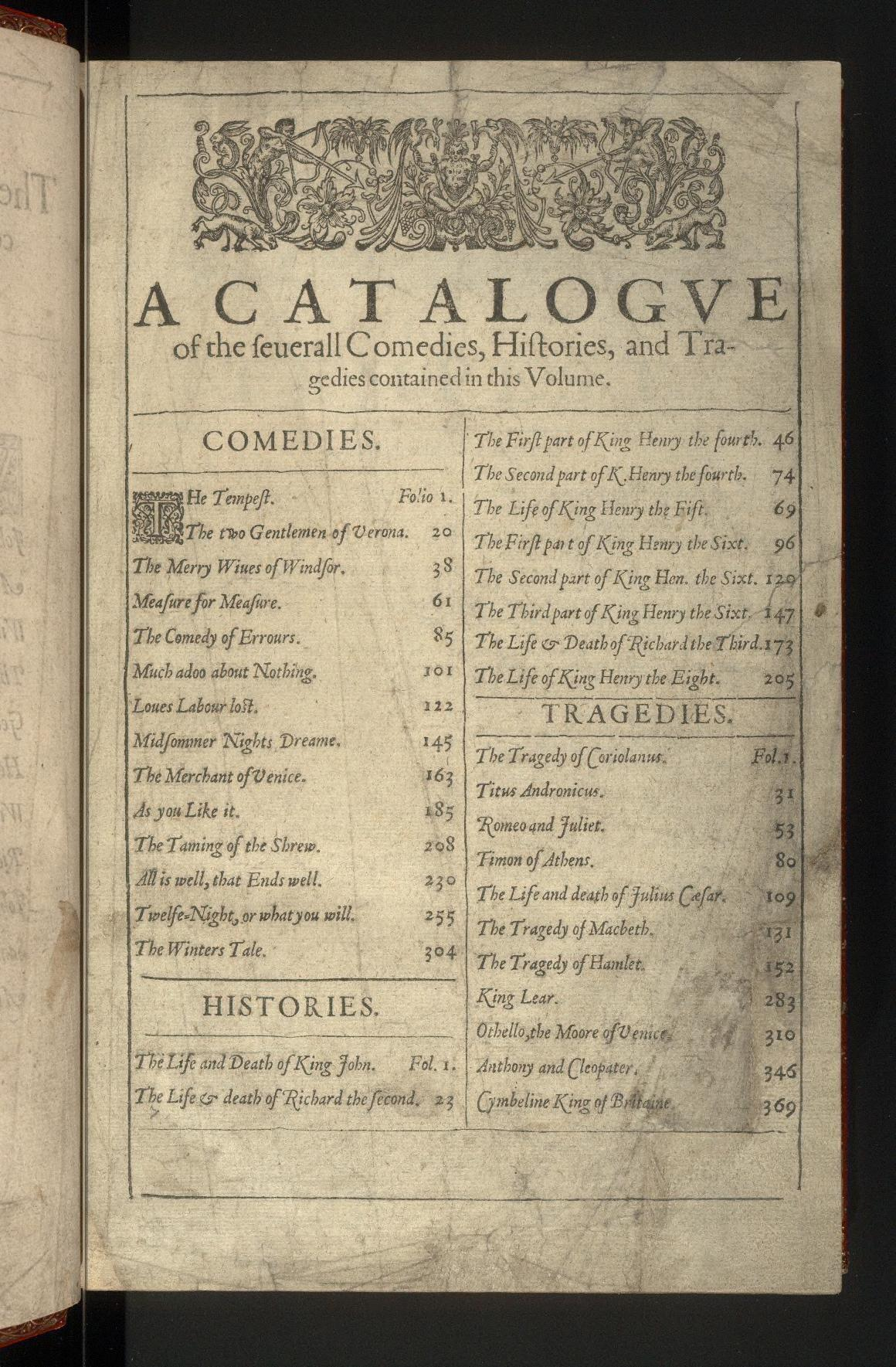
The First Folio, published in 1623, included 36 of Shakespeare's plays

William Shakespeare (1564–1616) was an English poet and playwright. He wrote or co-wrote approximately 39 plays and 154 sonnets, as well as a variety of other poems. (Note: The exact figures cannot be known. See Shakespearean authorship, Shakespeare's collaborations and Shakespeare Apocrypha for further details.)

== Plays ==
=== Tragedies ===
Shakespeare's plays
Title	Year written	First publications	Performances	Authorship notes
Antony and Cleopatra	1601–1608	First published in the First Folio	Believed to have been performed between 1606 and 1608.	
Antony and Cleopatra	Summary	In a setting soon after Julius Caesar, Marc Antony is in love with Cleopatra, an Egyptian queen. What used to be a friendship between Emperor Octavius and Antony develops into a hatred as Antony rejects the Emperor's sister, his wife, in favour of Cleopatra. Antony attempts to take the throne from Octavius and fails, while Cleopatra commits suicide.		
Coriolanus	1605–1608 (believed)	First published in the First Folio	No recorded performances prior to the Restoration; the first recorded performance involved Nahum Tate's bloody 1682 adaptation at Drury Lane.	
Coriolanus	Summary	The Roman military leader Caius Martius, after leading Rome to several victories against the Volscians, returns home as a war hero with a new last name, Coriolanus, given for the city of Corioles which he conquered. However, after an attempt at political office turns sour, he is banished from Rome as a traitor. Hungry for revenge, Coriolanus becomes leader of the Volscian army and marches to the gates of Rome. His mother, his wife, and his son, however, beg him to stop his attack. He agrees and makes peace between Romans and Volscians, but is assassinated by enemy Volscians.		
Hamlet	Likely early 17th century	First published in the so-called "bad" First Quarto, 1603	Earliest recorded performance of Hamlet was in June 1602, with Richard Burbage in the title role.	Some scholars, such as Peter Alexander and Eric Sams, believe that the oft-attributed source work known as the Ur-Hamlet was actually a first draft of the play, written by Shakespeare himself sometime prior to 1589.
Hamlet	Summary	Prince Hamlet is visited by his father's ghost and ordered to avenge his father's murder by killing King Claudius, his uncle. After struggling with several questions, including whether what the ghost said is true and whether it is right for him to take revenge, Hamlet, along with almost all the other major characters, is killed.		
Julius Caesar	1599	First published in the First Folio	Thomas Platter, a Swiss traveller, saw a tragedy about Julius Caesar at a Bankside theatre on 21 September 1599. This was most likely Shakespeare's play. There is no immediately obvious alternative candidate. (While the story of Julius Caesar was dramatised repeatedly in the Elizabethan/Jacobean period, none of the other plays known are as good a match with Platter's description as Shakespeare's play.)	
Julius Caesar	Summary	Cassius persuades his friend Brutus to join a conspiracy to kill Julius Caesar, whose power seems to be growing too great for Rome's good. After killing Caesar, however, Brutus fails to convince the people that his cause was just. He and Cassius eventually commit suicide as their hope for Rome becomes a lost cause.		
King Lear	1603–1606	Published in quarto in 1608	First recorded performance: 26 December 1606, before King James I at the Whitehall Palace.	
King Lear	Summary	An aged king divides his kingdom between two of his daughters, Regan and Goneril, and casts the youngest, Cordelia, out of his Kingdom for disloyalty. Eventually he comes to understand that it is Regan and Goneril who are disloyal, but he has already given them the kingdom. He wanders the countryside as a poor man until Cordelia comes with her husband, the King of France, to reclaim her father's lands. Regan and Goneril are defeated, but only after Cordelia has been captured and murdered. King Lear then dies of grief.		
Macbeth	1603–1606	First published in the First Folio	There are "fairly clear allusions to the play in 1607." The earliest account of a performance of the play is April 1611, when Simon Forman recorded seeing it at the Globe Theatre.	The text of Macbeth which survives has plainly been altered by later hands. Most notable is the inclusion of two songs from Thomas Middleton's play The Witch (1615)
Macbeth	Summary	Macbeth, a Scottish noble, is urged by his wife to kill King Duncan to take the throne for himself. He covers the king's guards in blood to frame them for the deed, and is appointed King of Scotland. However, people suspect his sudden power, and he finds it necessary to commit more and more murders to maintain power, believing himself invincible so long as he is bloody. Finally, the old king's son Malcolm besieges Macbeth's castle, and Macduff slays Macbeth in armed combat.		
Othello	1602–1604 (c. 1603)	First published in 1622 in quarto format by Thomas Walkley. Included in the First Folio the following year.	Probably first performed for King James I at the Whitehall Palace on 1 November 1604.	
Othello	Summary	Othello, a Moor and military general living in Venice, elopes with Desdemona, the daughter of a senator. Later, in Cyprus, he is persuaded by his servant Iago that his wife (Desdemona) is having an affair with Michael Cassio, his lieutenant. Iago's story, however, is a lie. Desdemona and Cassio try to convince Othello of their honesty but are rejected. Pursuing a plan suggested by Iago, Othello sends assassins to attack Cassio, who is wounded, while Othello himself smothers Desdomona in her bed. Iago's plot is revealed too late, and Othello commits suicide.		
Romeo and Juliet	1595–1596, with a possible early draft written in 1591	First published in 1597 in Q1	First performed sometime between 1591 and March 1597	
Romeo and Juliet	Summary	In Verona, Italy, two families, the Montagues and the Capulets, are in the midst of a bloody feud. Romeo, a Montague, and Juliet, a Capulet, fall in love and struggle to maintain their relationship in the face of familial hatred. After Romeo kills Juliet's cousin Tybalt in a fit of passion, things fall apart. Both lovers eventually commit suicide within minutes of each other, and the feuding families make peace over their recent grief.		
Timon of Athens	c. 1607	First published in the First Folio	No recorded performances during Shakespeare's lifetime. An adaptation was staged by Thomas Shadwell in 1678.	Brian Vickers and others argue that Timon of Athens was co-written with Thomas Middleton, though some commentators disagree.
Timon of Athens	Summary	Timon of Athens is an apparently wealthy man in his community who freely gives of his abundance to those around him. Eventually, it becomes apparent that he is living on credit, when all of his creditors ask for payment on the same day. Timon asks for his friends to help, but is refused. Angry at mankind's double nature, he leaves the city for the wilderness, and lives in a cave. Despite the efforts of several men to cheer his spirits, he dies full of hatred for humanity.		
Titus Andronicus	Probably late 1593	First published in quarto in 1594; the second quarto was published in 1600, the third in 1611.	First recorded performance: 24 January 1594 at the Rose; repeat performances on 29 January and 4 February. The play was performed by the Admiral's Men and the Lord Chamberlain's Men later that same year in June 1594 at Newington Butts. There was another performance, probably also by the Lord Chamberlain's Men, on 1 January 1596, in Sir John Harington's household at Burley-on-the-Hill in Rutland.	Brian Vickers argues that Titus Andronicus was co-written with George Peele.
Titus Andronicus	Summary	Roman war hero Titus Andronicus returns victorious in his wars against the Goths. He kills one of the sons of the Queens of the Goths in a revenge ritual, despite her pleadings. When the queen becomes the Empress of Rome, she takes revenge on the house of Andronici for her son's blood. She has her sons rape and mutilate Titus' daughter, Lavinia, over her husband's murdered corpse, then frames Titus' own sons for the murder. Lavinia, however, manages to communicate to her father who the true murderers were, and Andronicus takes revenge, killing the queen and her two sons, but being killed in the act.		
Troilus and Cressida	1602 (believed)	1609: two separate editions in quarto	The dates of the play's earliest performances are uncertain due to contradictions in the editions published in 1609.	
Troilus and Cressida	Summary	The Trojans are under siege by the Grecian army of Agamemnon. Troilus, a Trojan, falls in love with Cressida, a Greek captive. When Cressida is given back to the Greeks as part of a prisoner exchange, Troilus fears that she will fall in love with one of them. His fears prove to be true when he crosses enemy lines during a truce and sees her and a Greek man together.		

=== Comedies ===
Shakespeare's plays
Title	Year written	First publications	Performances	Authorship notes
All's Well That Ends Well	1601–1608	First published in the First Folio	Believed to have been performed between 1606 and 1608.	No recorded performances before The Restoration. The earliest recorded performance was in 1741 at Goodman's Fields, with another the following year at Drury Lane.
All's Well That Ends Well	Summary	Helena, a ward of the Countess of Rousillion, falls in love with the Countess's son, Bertram. Daughter of a famous doctor, and a skilled physician in her own right, Helena cures the King of France—who feared he was dying—and he grants her Bertram's hand as a reward. Bertram, however, offended by the inequality of the marriage, sets off for war, swearing he will not live with his wife until she can present him with a son, and with his own ring—two tasks which he believes impossible. However, with the aid of a bed trick, Helena fulfils his tasks, Bertram realises the error of his ways, and they are reconciled.		
As You Like It	1599–1600	First published in the First Folio	No recorded performances prior to the Restoration; the first recorded performance involved Nahum Tate's bloody 1682 adaptation at Drury Lane.	No recorded performances before The Restoration, though there was a possible performance at Wilton House in Wiltshire; the King's Men were paid £30 to come to Wilton House and perform for the King and Court (remaining there due to an outburst of the bubonic plague) on 2 December 1603. A Herbert family tradition states the play was As You Like It. The King's Company was assigned the play by royal warrant in 1669, and it was acted at Drury Lane in 1723 in an adapted form called Love in a Forest.
As You Like It	Summary	Rosalind and her cousin flee into the Forest of Arden to escape troubles in court. There, they find Rosalind's love, Orlando, posting love letters on every tree. Rosalind, disguised as a boy, proposes to "cure" him of love. We meet exiled nobles, lovesick shepherds, and the cynical Jacques. Rosalind cleverly arranges a large group wedding at the end of the play.		
The Comedy of Errors	1592–1594	First published in the First Folio	The first recorded performance was by "a company of base and common fellows," mentioned in the Gesta Grayorum ("The Deeds of Gray") as having occurred in Gray's Inn Hall on 28 Dec 1594. The second also took place on "Innocents' Day" but ten years later—in 1604, at Court. (Note: The identical dates may not be coincidental; the Pauline and Ephesian aspect of the play, noted under Sources, may have had the effect of linking The Comedy of Errors to the holiday season—much like Twelfth Night, another play secular on its surface but linked to the Christmas holidays.)	
The Comedy of Errors	Summary	Egeon, about to be executed for unlawfully entering Ephesus, tells the sad tale of his search for his twin sons and wife. The Duke agrees to spare him if his family is found. Meanwhile, his twin sons, both of whom are named Antipholus, and their servants, both of whom are named Dromio, are actually in Ephesus, each unaware that he even has a twin. After a series of hilarious events involving mistaken identity almost ending in catastrophe, the twins are reunited with their mother and father, and realise their relation to each other.		
Cymbeline	This play is hard to date, though a relationship with a tragicomedy that Beaumont and Fletcher wrote c. 1609–10 tends to support this dating around 1609; though it is not clear which play preceded the other.	First published in the First Folio	Only one early performance is recorded with certainty, (Note: There is a performance mentioned in the Book of Plays of Simon Forman; even if it is genuine (not all commentators think it is), the Book of Plays reference is undated and lacks specific information.) which occurred on Wednesday night of 1 Jan 1634, at Court.	Possible collaboration (Note: The Yale Shakespeare edition suggests this was a collaborative work; some scenes (Act III scene 7 and Act V scene 2) may seem less characteristic of Shakespeare than the rest of the play.)
Cymbeline	Summary	The princess Imogen loves the commoner Posthumus, and marries him, but her father, King Cymbeline, disapproves of the match and exiles Posthumus. In exile, he meets the rogue Jachimo—who, to win a wager, persuades Posthumus, wrongly, that he (Jachimo) has slept with Imogen. Enraged, Posthumus orders a servant, Pisanio, to murder Imogen, but he cannot go through with his orders, and instead she finds herself befriended by the wild-living Polydore and Cadwal—who turn out to be her own brothers: Cymbeline's princes who had been stolen from his palace in their infancy. The repentant Posthumus fights alongside Polydore and Cadwal in a battle against the Romans, and following the intervention of the god Jupiter, the various truths are revealed, and everyone is reconciled.		
Love's Labour's Lost				
Love's Labour's Lost	Summary			
Measure for Measure	1603-1604	First published in the First Folio	Earliest recorded performance took place on 26th December 1604 (St Stephen's Night)	
Measure for Measure	Summary	Vincentio, Duke of Vienna, leaves the city and appoints Angelo, a Judge, to be his deputy until his return. Angelo uses this opportunity to enforce laws against sexual activity that had previously not been enforced. Claudio, who has slept with his fiance and gotten her pregnant, is therefore arrested and sentenced to death. Isabella, his sister, leaves the nunnery where she is a novice to speak with Angelo on her brother's behalf. He attempts to coerce her into sleeping with him in exchange for her brother's freedom, but she refuses to yield. Isabella then works with Friar Lodowick (actually the Duke in disguise) and Mariana, Angelo's jilted ex-fiance, to thwart Angelo. They arrange for a "bed trick" wherein Mariana pretends to be Isabella and sleeps with Angelo, as well as a "head trick" where another prisoner is beheaded and presented to Angelo as Claudio. Following this, the Duke 'returns' and hears a petition against Angelo, finding him guilty. Vincentio then proposes marriage to Isabella, but she does not reply and then play ends with an ambiguous silence.		
The Merchant of Venice				
The Merchant of Venice	Summary	Antonio borrows money from Shylock, a Jewish moneylender, to lend money to his friend Bassanio. Bassanio uses the money to successfully woo Portia, a wealthy and intelligent woman with a large inheritance. Unfortunately, a tragic accident leaves Antonio unable to repay his debt to Shylock, and he must be punished as agreed by giving a pound of his flesh to the moneylender. Portia travels in disguise to the court and saves Antonio by pointing out that Shylock may only take flesh, and not any blood. Shylock is foiled, Portia reveals her identity, and Antonio's wealth is restored.		
The Merry Wives of Windsor				
The Merry Wives of Windsor	Summary			
A Midsummer Night's Dream	Approximately 1595	Registered in the 1600 quarto by Thomas Fisher on 8 October 1600	The title page assures it was "sundry times publicly acted by the Right Honorable the Lord Chamberlain and his Servants" prior to its 1600 publication.	
A Midsummer Night's Dream	Summary	In Athens, Hermia is in love with Lysander, defying her father's command to marry Demetrius; the couple flee to the woods to avoid the law sentencing her to death or a nunnery. Demetrius pursues them, and is in turn pursued by Helena, who is in unrequited love with him. Meanwhile, a group of low-class workers decides to stage a play for the wedding of the King and Queen of Athens; they rehearse in the woods. Fairy king Oberon is quarrelling with his queen Titania; he magically causes her to fall in love with one of the actors, Bottom, whom he has transformed to have the head of an ass. He also attempts to resolve the Athenian youths' love triangle, but his servant Puck accidentally causes both Lysander and Demetrius to fall in love with Helena instead of Hermia. In the end, Oberon has Puck restore Lysander to loving Hermia, allows Demetrius to stay in love with Helena, and returns Titania to her senses and Bottom to his shape. They return to Athens, where Lysander and Hermia are pardoned and they all watch the workers (badly) perform their play.		
Much Ado About Nothing				
Much Ado About Nothing	Summary	In Messina, Italy, a young prince named Don Pedro arrives from Aragon to visit a friend of his, Leonato. With him he brings a Florentine named Claudio, a soldier named Benedick, and his bastard brother, Don Jon. Upon their arrival, Claudio falls in love with Leonato's daughter, Hero and wishes to marry her. Don Jon, out of desire to cause mischief, interferes once unsuccessfully and once successfully in thwarting the gullible Claudio into thinking that Hero and that Claudio's friends are disloyal. Arguably, the leading couple of the play are the soldier Benedick, and Hero's cousin, Beatrice, who, at the beginning of the play, seem to detest each other, until Don Pedro persuades everyone that they can make Benedick and Beatrice fall in love with one another.		
Pericles, Prince of Tyre	Either 1607–1608, or written at an earlier date and revised at that time	1609 quarto	The Venetian ambassador to England, Zorzi Giustinian, saw a play titled Pericles during his time in London, which ran from 5 Jan 1606 to 23 Nov 1608. As far as is known, there was no other play with the same title that was acted in this era; the logical assumption is that this must have been Shakespeare's play.	Shakespeare is thought to be responsible for the main portion of the play after scene 9. The first two acts were likely written by a relatively untalented reviser or collaborator, possibly George Wilkins.
Pericles, Prince of Tyre	Summary	This episodic story, covering many years, charts the history of Pericles, who believes he has lost both his daughter and his wife, but is ultimately reunited with both. His daughter Marina, sold into prostitution, proves to be a paragon of virtue; and his wife Thaisa, recovered by a skilled doctor having been buried at sea, becomes a priestess of the goddess Diana.		
The Taming of the Shrew				
The Taming of the Shrew	Summary	The play begins with a framing device, often referred to as the Induction, in which a drunken tinker named Sly is tricked into thinking he is a nobleman by a mischievous Lord. The Lord has a play performed for Sly's amusement, set in Padua with a primary and sub-plot. The main plot depicts the courtship of Petruchio, a gentleman of Verona, and Katherina, the headstrong, obdurate shrew. Initially, Katherina is an unwilling participant in the relationship, but Petruchio tempers her with various psychological torments—the "taming"—until she is an obedient bride. The sub-plot features a competition between the suitors of Katherina's more tractable sister, Bianca.		
The Tempest				
The Tempest	Summary	Prospero, overthrown and exiled Duke of Milan, lives on a small island with his daughter Miranda. By chance, his usurping brother Antonio, along with Alonso, King of Naples (who helped him) and his retinue, have passed near the island on a ship; Prospero, aided by his fairy servant Ariel, has magically called up a tempest to shipwreck them. Prospero toys with them but ultimately forgives Alonso (who has been betrayed in turn by Antonio) and permits Alonso's son Ferdinand to marry Miranda. Before returning to reclaim his throne, Prospero renounces magic.		
Twelfth Night	1600–1601	First Folio	Earliest known performance 2 February 1602	
Twelfth Night	Summary	Viola finds herself shipwrecked in Illyria and, assuming that her brother Sebastian has died in the wreck, disguises herself as a man to gain a position in Duke Orsino's court. Orsino sends Viola (whom he knows as Cesario) to deliver a message to his love, Olivia. Olivia, however, dislikes the Duke. She falls in love with Viola, who she thinks is a man. Eventually, Viola's brother Sebastian, who in fact was unharmed in the wreck, reappears. At a critical moment, Viola's true identity is revealed when members of the court notice the similarities between her and Sebastian. Olivia quickly falls in love with Sebastian, and Viola confesses her love for the Duke.		
The Two Gentlemen of Verona				
The Two Gentlemen of Verona	Summary	Two close friends, Proteus and Valentine, are divided when Valentine is sent to the Duke's court in Milan. Proteus later follows, leaving behind his loyal beloved, Julia, and he and Valentine both fall in love with the Duke's daughter, Silvia. Valentine proves himself brave and honourable, while Proteus is underhanded and deceitful—and eventually attempts to rape Silvia. Julia follows her betrothed to Milan, disguised as a boy, Sebastian, who becomes Proteus' page. Eventually Proteus sees the error of his ways and returns to Julia, while Valentine marries Silvia.		
The Two Noble Kinsmen	1613–1614	Published as a quarto in 1635		Thought to be a collaboration with John Fletcher. Shakespeare is thought to have written the following parts of this play: Act I, scenes 1–3; Act II, scene 1; Act III, scene 1; Act V, scene 1, lines 34–173, and scenes 3 and 4.
The Two Noble Kinsmen	Summary	Two close friends, Palamon and Arcite, are divided by their love of the same woman: Duke Theseus' sister-in-law Emelia. They are eventually forced to compete publicly for her hand, but once the bout is over, the victor dies tragically and the other marries their love.		
The Winter's Tale	Estimates vary widely, from 1594 to 1611	First published in the First Folio.		
The Winter's Tale	Summary	In Sicilia, King Leontes becomes convinced that his wife, Hermione, is having an affair with his friend Polixenes, King of Bohemia. He has her imprisoned and sends delegates to ask an oracle if his suspicions are true. While in prison, Hermione gives birth to a girl and Leontes has it sent to Bohemia to be placed alone in the wild. When the delegates return and state that the oracle has exonerated Hermione, Leontes remains stubborn and his wife and son die. Sixteen years later, a repentant Leontes is reunited with his daughter, who is in love with the Prince of Bohemia. His wife is also later reunited with him by extraordinary means.		

=== Histories ===
Shakespeare's plays
Title	Year written	First publications	Performances	Authorship notes
Henry IV, Part 1	Likely early to mid 1590s	First published in a 1598 quarto by Andrew Wise	Though 1 Henry IV was almost certainly in performance by 1597, the earliest recorded performance was on 6 March 1600, when it was acted at Court before the Flemish Ambassador. Other Court performances followed in 1612 and 1625.	
Henry IV, Part 2	1597–1599	First published in a quarto in 1600 by Valentine Simms	Philip Henslowe's diary records a performance of a Henry VI on 3 March 1592, by the Lord Strange's Men. Thomas Nashe refers in 1592 to a popular play about Lord Talbot, seen by "ten thousand spectators at least" at separate times. (Note: Since Henry VI, part 3 was also acted in 1592—Robert Greene parodied one of its lines in his 1592 pamphlet A Groatsworth of Wit—the implication is that all three parts of the trilogy were being acted in 1592.)	
Henry V	1599	Published in a "bad quarto" (Note: A "bad quarto" was a version of a play that was not the official version from the playwright themselves; often these versions were written down during a performance and printed later, leading to great inaccuracies in the text.) in 1600 by Thomas Millington and John Busby; reprinted in "bad" form in 1603 and 1619, it was published fully for the first time in the First Folio.	A tradition, impossible to verify, holds that Henry V was the first play performed at the new Globe Theatre in the spring of 1599; the Globe would have been the "wooden O" mentioned in the Prologue. In 1600 the first printed text states that the play had been performed "sundry times", though the first recorded performance was on 7 January 1605, at Court.	
Henry VI, Part 1	1588–1592	First published in the First Folio	Philip Henslowe's diary records a performance of a Henry VI on 3 March 1592, by the Lord Strange's Men. Thomas Nashe refers in 1592 to a popular play about Lord Talbot, seen by "ten thousand spectators at least" at separate times.	There is stylistic evidence that Part 1 is not by Shakespeare alone, but co-written by a team with three or more unknown playwrights (though Thomas Nashe is a possibility).
Henry VI, Part 2	1590–1591	A version was published in 1594, and again in 1600 (Q2) and 1619 (Q3); the last as part of William Jaggrd's False Folio.	See notes for Henry VI, Part I above. Parts I and III of Henry VI are known to have been playing in 1592, and it is assumed (but not reliably known) part 2 was presented at the same times.	
Henry VI, Part 3	1590–1591	A version was published in 1594, and again in 1600 (Q2) and 1619 (Q3); the last as part of William Jaggrd's False Folio.	Performed before 1592, when Robert Greene parodied one of the play's lines in his pamphlet A Groatsworth of Wit. See notes for Part II and I above.	
Henry VIII			A fire destroyed the Globe Theatre during a performance of this play on 29 June 1613, as recorded in several contemporary documents. While some modern scholars believe the play was relatively new (one contemporary report states that it "had been acted not passing 2 or 3 times before").	Thought to be a collaboration between Shakespeare and John Fletcher, due to the style of the verse. Shakespeare is thought to have written Act I, scenes i and ii; II, ii and iv; III, ii, lines 1–203 (to exit of King); V, i.
King John	1595–1598		First known performance at Covent Garden Theatre on 26 February 1737 but doubtlessly performed as early as the 1590s.	
Richard II				
Richard III	Around 1593.	First published in a quarto in 1597.		
Edward III	1592 or 1593	Cuthbert Burby, quarto editions in 1596 and 1599.		Generally considered a collaboration with either Thomas Kyd or Christopher Marlowe, but there is still no agreement upon the collaborators.

== Selected poems ==
Title	Year written	First publications	Authorship notes
Venus and Adonis	1593	1593	
The Rape of Lucrece	1594	1594	
The Passionate Pilgrim		1598 or 1599	An anthology of 20 poems collected and published by William Jaggard that were attributed to "W. Shakespeare" on the title page, only five of which are considered authentically Shakespearean.
The Phoenix and the Turtle		1601	
A Lover's Complaint		1609	
Shakespeare's Sonnets		1609	
A Funeral Elegy		1612	No longer attributed to Shakespeare by most scholars.
To the Queen		Discovered in 1972.	Disputed attribution.

== Apocrypha ==
The Shakespeare apocrypha is a group of plays and poems that have sometimes been attributed to Shakespeare, but whose attribution is questionable for various reasons.

Title	Year written	First publications	Performances	Authorship notes
Sir Thomas More				The passages ascribed to Hand D "are now generally accepted as the work of Shakespeare." However, the identification remains debatable.
Cardenio (lost)				Cardenio was apparently co-written with John Fletcher. Some regard Lewis Theobald's Double Falsehood as a revised version of Cardenio.
Love's Labour's Won (lost)	Before 1598			
The Birth of Merlin				
Locrine	Unknown, estimates range from the early 1580s to 1594.	1595 quarto issued by the bookseller Thomas Creede		
The London Prodigal				
The Second Maiden's Tragedy				
The Puritan				
Sir John Oldcastle				
Thomas Lord Cromwell				
A Yorkshire Tragedy				
