= Thadious Davis =

American professor

- Born: 1944

Academic background
- Education: Southern University (B.S.); Atlanta University (N.A.); Boston University (PhD,)
- Thesis: Faulkner's "Negro" : art and the Southern context, 1926–1936 (1976)

Thadious M. Davis is the Geraldine R. Segal Professor of American Social Thought and Professor of English at the University of Pennsylvania. She is best known for her work on African American and Southern literature.

== Education and career ==
Davis has a B.S. from Southern University and an M.A. from Atlanta University. She earned her Ph.D. from Boston University.

She has been a professor at the University of North Carolina at Chapel Hill, Brown University, and Vanderbilt University, where she held the position of the Gertrude Conway Vanderbilt Professor of English. As of 2022, she is the Geraldine R. Segal Professor of American Social Thought and Professor of English at the University of Pennsylvania.

Davis has been a fellow at multiple libraries, including the Newberry Library in Chicago, the Cullman Center for Scholars and Writers at the New York Public Library, and the Huntington Library in San Marino, California, where she held the R. Stanton Avery Distinguished Fellowship.

== Works ==
Davis is known for her writings on race, gender, and region. She wrote a biography of Nella Larsen, Nella Larsen, Novelist of the Harlem Renaissance, and edited the Penguin Classics editions of both of Larsen's books: Passing and Quicksand.

Davis's 2009 book, Games of Property: Law, Race, Gender, and Faulkner's Go Down Moses, received honorable mention for the William Sanders Scarborough Prize Winners given by the Modern Language Association. Her 2014 book, Southscapes: Geographies of Race, Region, Literature focuses on writings by black southern writers from Mississippi and Louisiana.

== Selected publications ==
- Nella Larsen, novelist of the Harlem Renaissance : a woman's life unveiled. Louisiana State University Press. 1996. ISBN 0-8071-2070-7. OCLC 611732169.
- Davis, Thadious M. (2009). Games of Property : Law, Race, Gender, and Faulkner's 'Go Down, Moses'. Duke University Press Books. OCLC 743402243.
- Davis, Thadious M. (2014). Southscapes Geographies of Race, Region, and Literature. The University of North Carolina Press. ISBN 978-1-4696-0255-4. OCLC 957516662.

== Honors and awards ==
In 1994, Davis received the Anna Julia Cooper Award for Feminist Scholarship from Spelman College. In 1995, the College Language Association presented Davis with an award for creative scholarship for her book on Nella Larsen.

Davis received a lifetime achievement award from the Society for the Study of Multi-Ethnic Literature in 2007. In 2017, she received the Callaloo's Lifetime Achievement Award for American Literary and Cultural Studies.
