= George B. Hutchinson =

American scholar

Professor George B. Hutchinson
- Born: George Bain Hutchinson; November 1953 (age 72)
- Known for: The Harlem Renaissance in Black and White (1995)
- Title: Newton C. Farr Professor of American Culture; George Reed Professor of Writing and Rhetoric
- Awards: Andrew W. Mellon Foundation summer stipend (1986); NEH Fellowship for University Teachers (1988, 1989–1990); Darwin T. Turner Award, Modern Language Association; Division on African-American Literature (1995); Chancellor's Citation, University of Tennessee (1997); Bronze Medal Independent Publishers Book Award for Biography (2007); Christian Gauss Award (Phi Beta Kappa) (2007); Guggenheim Fellowship (2011–2012)

Academic background
- Education: Brown University; Indiana University Bloomington
- Thesis: American Shaman: Visionary Ecstasy and Poetic Function in Whitman’s Verse (1983)

Academic work
- Discipline: Americanist
- Sub-discipline: Biographical criticism
- Institutions: University of Tennessee (1982–2000); University of Bonn (1993–1994, 1998); Indiana University Bloomington (2000–2012); Cornell University (2012–present); Atkinson Center for a Sustainable Future (2016–2021)
- Main interests: Harlem Renaissance; African American literature; African-American culture

George Bain Hutchinson (born November 1953) is an American scholar, currently working as the Newton C. Farr Professor of American Culture, as well as the George Reed Professor of Writing and Rhetoric at Cornell University. He is also Director of the John S. Knight Institute for Writing in the Disciplines. He is a professor of nineteenth- and twentieth-century American and African American literature and culture. In addition to this, Hutchinson is also the author of several books on American and African American literary history, and is a recipient of both the NEH and Guggenheim Fellowships.

== Early life ==
Hutchinson was raised in Indianapolis. As a child, he loved writing fiction, beginning in about fourth grade. By high school he had developed an interest in both research and writing. He has shown interest in the creative, self-expressive aspect of writing. He has said that his mother encouraged openness to new ideas while valuing enduring cultural traditions. Hutchinson has said that his upbringing encouraged him to question intellectual trends and reassess historical interpretations. He also cited his maternal grandfather, a geologist, as an early intellectual influence.

He graduated from Brown University with an A.B. in American Civilization in 1975. At Brown, he won a silver medal in the Intercollegiate Rowing Association championships in 1973 and served as captain and stroke of the men's varsity crew in 1974–75.

He served in the Peace Corps in Burkina Faso from 1975 to 1977, organizing well-digging projects by hand, for water, in rural villages. He later wrote that the experience changed his expectations about development work. While in Burkina Faso, he read Julius Nyerere's Ujamaa: Essays on Socialism. These essays had a lasting influence on Hutchinson's view of property rights and their relation to individual rights more generally, not to mention capitalist democracy itself. Hutchinson later wrote that his experience digging wells in rural Burkina Faso influenced his views on society and politics.

== Career ==
After graduating from Indiana University Bloomington with a Ph.D. in English and American Studies in 1983, Hutchinson taught at the University of Tennessee from 1982 to 2000, chairing the American Studies Program from 1987 to 2000 and holding the Kenneth Curry Chair in English from 1999 to 2000. During this time, he was President of the Knoxville Rowing Association and played an important role in establishing the university's first-ever varsity women's crew. In 1986, his first book, The Ecstatic Whitman, was published by The Ohio State Press. In 1993-4 and 1998, Hutchinson was Visiting Professor of North American Studies at the University of Bonn.

Hutchinson's second book, The Harlem Renaissance in Black and White, was published by Harvard University Press in 1995. Hutchinson was nominated for a Pulitzer Prize in History in 2006 for this book, which was also a finalist for the Anne Rea Jewell Non-Fiction Prize of The Boston Book Review in 1996. Following a lecture given by Hutchinson at the Hutchins Center for African and African American Research in 2021, more than twenty-five years after The Harlem Renaissance in Black and White was initially published, the Afro-American scholar Henry Louis Gates Jr. notably acknowledged the status of Hutchinson's book as "the bible on the Harlem Renaissance".

From 2000 to 2012, Hutchinson was the Booth Tarkington Professor of Literary Studies at Indiana University Bloomington, where he chaired the English department. In 2006, Harvard University Press published Hutchinson's third book, In Search of Nella Larsen: A Biography of the Color Line (2006), which is widely cited in scholarship on Larsen.

In 2013, Hutchinson joined Cornell University as the Newton C. Farr Professor of American Culture, where he also serves as George Reed Professor of Writing and Rhetoric and Director of the John S. Knight Institute for Writing in the Disciplines. At Cornell, his teaching and research focus on 19th- and 20th-century American literature and culture, with particular attention to race in American culture, African American literature, and literary ecology.

His book Facing the Abyss: American Literature and Culture in the 1940s—a work of cultural criticism and history that brings together a wide range of literature, art, philosophy, and music alongside discourses on civil rights, ethnicity, gender, labor, politics and ecology—was published by Columbia University Press in 2018 and received widespread acclaim for its revisionary approach to the decade.

From 2016 to 2021, Hutchinson held a faculty fellowship from Cornell's Atkinson Center for a Sustainable Future, during which he advanced research in environmental humanities and literary ecology, with particular attention to intersections of race, African American literature, and environmental justice. He co-organized the Environmental Humanities Lecture Series (2017–2018) and hosted events on literature and environmental justice.

In 2019, he edited the Penguin Classics edition of Jean Toomer's Cane, providing a new introduction, explanatory notes, and suggestions for further reading; the edition was selected as an Editor's Choice by The New York Times Book Review. He is also the author of the forthcoming biography Jean Toomer: Writer for a New America, scheduled for publication by Yale University Press on August 18, 2026, as part of the press's Black Lives series of biographies of influential figures of African descent.

== Awards ==
Hutchinson was 1988 and 1989 NEH Fellow. He was also a 2011 Guggenheim Fellow. His book In Search of Nella Larsen, a biography of the author long referred to by scholars as "the mystery woman of the Harlem Renaissance", won the Christian Gauss Award of Phi Beta Kappa and Bronze Medal Independent Publisher Book Award for Biography in 2007 and was listed by The Washington Post and Booklist as one of the best Nonfiction books of 2006. It was also selected as an Editors' Choice by NYTBR and as an Outstanding Academic Title by Choice magazine. His book Facing the Abyss: American Literature and Culture in the 1940s was shortlisted for the Christian Gauss Award in 2019 and won Honorable Mention for the Matei Călinescu Prize of the MLA, awarded for what the association describes as distinguished scholarship on 20th and 21st century literature and thought. His edition of Jean Toomer's Cane (novel), published by Penguin Classics in 2019, was an Editors' Choice of NYTBR.

== Works ==
=== Authored ===
- The Ecstatic Whitman: Literary Shamanism and the Crisis of the Union (PDF). Ohio State University Press. 1986. ISBN 978-0-814-20412-2.
- The Harlem Renaissance in Black and White. Harvard University Press. 1995. ISBN 978-0-674-37262-7.
- In Search of Nella Larsen: A Biography of the Color Line. Harvard University Press. 2006. ISBN 978-0-674-02180-8.
- Facing the Abyss: American Literature and Culture in the 1940s. Columbia University Press. 2018. ISBN 978-0-231-54596-9.
- The Art of Spencer Hutchinson. Ersatz Modem Press. 2024. ISBN 978-1-681-11590-0.
- Jean Toomer: Writer for a New America. Yale University Press. 2026. ISBN 978-0-300-26773-0.

=== Edited ===
- The Cambridge Companion to the Harlem Renaissance. Cambridge University Press. 2007. ISBN 978-0-521-67368-6.
- with John K. Young, Publishing Blackness: Textual Constructions of Race Since 1850. University of Michigan Press. 2013. ISBN 978-0-472-90099-2.
- by Anita Thompson Dickinson Reynolds and Howard Miller. American Cocktail: A "Colored Girl" in the World. Harvard University Press. 2014. ISBN 978-0-674-07305-0.
- by Jean Toomer. Cane, Penguin Books, 2019. ISBN 978-0-143-13367-4

== See also ==
- African American culture
- Biographical criticism
- Ethnic studies
