= Passing (novel) =

1929 novel by Nella Larsen

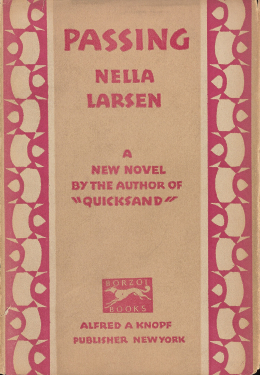
- First edition dust jacket
- Author: Nella Larsen
- Language: English
- Genre: Tragedy
- Publisher: Knopf
- Publication date: April 1929
- Publication place: United States
- Media type: Print (Hardback)
- Pages: 215
- OCLC: 2812987
- Dewey Decimal: 813/.52
- LC Class: PZ3.L33 Pas PS3523.A7225
- Preceded by: Quicksand
- Text: Passing at Wikisource

Passing is a 1929 novel (Note: Its short length has led Passing to sometimes be categorized as a novella.) by American author Nella Larsen. Set primarily in the Harlem neighborhood of New York City in the 1920s, the story centers on the reunion of two childhood friends—Clare Kendry and Irene Redfield—and their increasing fascination with each other's lives. The title refers to the practice of "racial passing", which is a key element of the novel. Clare Kendry's attempt to pass as white for her husband, John (Jack) Bellew, is significant and is a catalyst for the tragic events.

Larsen's exploration of race was informed by her own mixed racial heritage and the increasingly common practice of racial passing in the 1920s. Praised upon publication, the novel has since been celebrated in modern scholarship for its complex depiction of race, gender, and sexuality, and the book is the subject of considerable scholarly criticism. As one of only two novels that Larsen wrote, the novel has been significant in placing its author at the forefront of several literary canons.

The novel was adapted as a 2021 film of the same name by Rebecca Hall.

== Plot ==
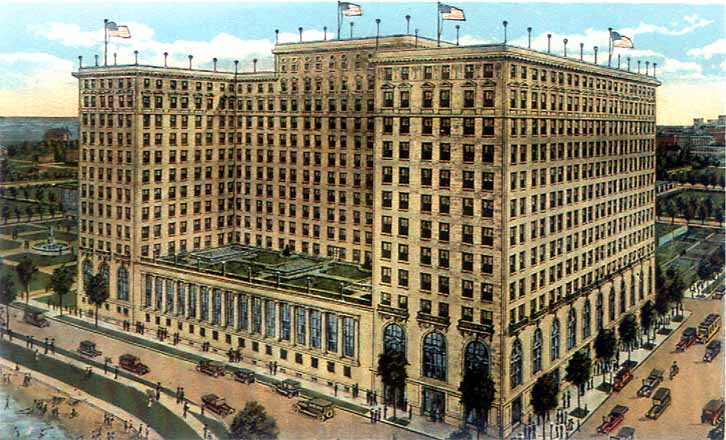
The Drake Hotel in Chicago, on which the "Drayton Hotel" in Passing is principally modeled.

The story is written as a third person narrative from the perspective of Irene Redfield, an African-American woman of mixed race who could "pass" for white. She lives in Harlem in New York City.

Part One of the book, titled "Encounter," opens with Irene receiving a letter from Clare Kendry, causing her to recall a chance encounter she had had with her, at the roof restaurant of the Drayton Hotel in Chicago, during a brief stay in the city. Irene does not answer Clare's letters attempting to reconnect. The women grew up together but lost touch when Clare's white father died and she was taken to live with her two paternal white aunts. Irene learns that Clare is passing for white, living primarily in Europe with her unsuspecting, rich, racist white husband and their daughter.

Although Irene tries to avoid further engagement with Clare, she never is able to fully exclude her from her life as she later visits Clare for tea along with another childhood friend, Gertrude Martin. Toward the end of the visit, Clare's white husband John (Jack) Bellew arrives. Unaware that all three women have black ancestry, Jack enthusiastically affirms his hatred of black people, making the women uneasy. In a startling passage, he also reveals his pet name for Clare, "Nig". Although Jack does not suspect that his wife has black ancestry (and, in fact, believes that his "Nig" hates black people as much as he does), he gave her that name because he perceives that Clare, who was "white as a lily" when they were married, has been "gettin' darker and darker". Irene and Gertrude say nothing in response, in part to maintain Clare's secret identity. Afterwards, Irene receives a letter of apology from Clare but destroys it in an effort to forget about Clare. Irene seeks instead to focus on her own life with her husband, Brian, and their two sons, Theodore and Junior.

Part Two of the book, "Re-encounter," returns to the present, with Irene having received the letter from Clare. After Irene ignores it, Clare visits in person, and Irene reluctantly agrees to see her. When Clare learns that Irene serves on the committee for the "Negro Welfare League" (NWL) (Note: This organization is "a fictional cross between the two most important black 'uplift' organizations: the National Urban League, founded in 1911, and the National Association for the Advancement of Colored People, founded in 1909.") she invites herself to their upcoming dance. Irene advises against that, because of the risk that Jack will find out. Clare attends the dance and enjoys it, and is drawn to continue spending time in Harlem. Irene and Clare resume their childhood companionship, and Clare frequently visits Irene's home.

The third part of the novel begins before Christmas; Irene's relationship with her husband has become increasingly fraught. She is aware of Clare's appeal, and becomes convinced that her husband is having an affair with the friend. While shopping with a Black friend, Felise Freeland, Irene encounters Clare's husband, Jack. When he tries to greet her, she pretends not to know him, to avoid his meeting Felise. But Irene thinks the encounter may help expose Clare's secret. Irene considers warning Clare but decides against it.

Later, Clare accompanies Irene and Brian to a party hosted by Felise. The gathering is interrupted by Jack, who accuses Clare of being a "damned dirty nigger!" Irene rushes to Clare, who is standing by an open window. Suddenly, Clare falls out of the window to the ground six stories below. She is pronounced dead by the guests who eventually gather at the site. It is unclear whether she fell accidentally, was pushed by either Irene or Bellew, or committed suicide. The book ends with Irene's fragmented anguish at Clare's death.

== Background ==
=== Biographical context ===
As early as 1925, Nella Larsen had decided that she wanted to be among the "New Negro" writers of the time. Initially writing short stories, which were sold early in 1926 to a ladies magazine, she was rumored that year to be writing a novel. In a letter to her friend, Carl Van Vechten, she said, "it is the awful truth. But, who knows if I'll get through with the damned thing. Certainly not I."

In April 1927, Larsen and her husband, Elmer Imes, moved from Jersey City, New Jersey to Harlem to be closer to the cultural ferment of the neighborhood. The following year, Larsen published her first novel Quicksand with New York-based publisher Knopf. Its favorable critical reception encouraged her ambitions to become known as a novelist.

=== Historical context ===
The 1920s in the United States was a period marked by considerable anxiety and discussion over the crossing of racial boundaries, the so-called "color line" between blacks and whites. This anxiety was exacerbated by the Great Migration, in which hundreds of thousands of Blacks left the rural south for northern and midwestern cities, where, together with new waves of immigrants, they changed the social makeup. The practice of persons "crossing the color line"—attempting to claim recognition in another racial group than the one they were believed to belong to—was known as "passing". As many African Americans had European ancestry in varying proportions, some appeared visibly European. The legacy of slavery, with its creation of a racial caste, and the imposition in the 20th century of the so-called one-drop rule (by which someone with even one ancestor of sub-Saharan-African origin was considered black) led to a hardening of racial lines that had historically been more fluid; at any time, the concept of race was "historically contingent." Although the exact numbers of people who passed is, for obvious reasons, not known, many estimates were made at the time. The sociologist Charles S. Johnson (1893–1956) calculated that 355,000 blacks had passed between 1900 and 1920.

A significant precedent for Larsen's depiction of Clare and Jack's relationship was the 1925 legal trial known as the "Rhinelander Case" (or Rhinelander v. Rhinelander). On the urging of his family, Leonard Kip Rhinelander, a wealthy white man, sued his wife, Alice Beatrice Jones, for annulment and fraud; he alleged that she had failed to inform him of her "colored" blood. The case concerned not only race but also status and class, as he had met her when she was working as a domestic. Although the jury eventually returned a verdict for Alice (she contended that her mixed race was obvious, and she had never denied it), it came at a devastating social cost for both parties; intimate exchanges between the couple were read out in court, and Alice was forced to partially disrobe in front of the jury in the judge's chambers in order for them to assess the darkness of her skin. Larsen refers to the case near the end of the novel, when Irene wonders about the consequences of Jack discovering Clare's racial status: "What if Bellew should divorce Clare? Could he? There was the Rhinelander case." The case received substantial coverage in the press of the time, and Larsen could assume that it was common knowledge to her readers.

== Themes ==
=== Race and "tragic mulatto" ===
Though Passing does indeed relate the tragic fate of a mulatto who passes for white, it also centers on jealousy, psychological ambiguity and intrigue. By focusing on the latter elements, Passing is transformed from an anachronistic, melodramatic novel into a skillfully executed and enduring work of art.

— Claudia Tate, 1980

Passing has been described as "the tragic story of a beautiful light-skinned mixed-race woman passing for white in high society." The tragic mulatto (also "mulatta" when referring to a woman) is a stock character in early African-American literature. Such accounts often featured the light-skinned offspring of a white slaveholder and his black slave, whose mixed heritage in a race-based society means that she is unable to identify or find a place with either blacks or whites. The resulting feeling of exclusion was portrayed as variably manifested in self-loathing, depression, alcoholism, sexual perversion, and attempts at suicide.

On the surface, Passing conforms to that stereotype in its portrayal of Clare Kendry, whose passing for white has tragic consequences; however, the book resists the conventions of the genre, as Clare refuses to feel the expected anguish at the betrayal of her black identity and socializes with blacks for the purposes of excitement rather than racial solidarity. Scholars have more generally considered Passing as a novel in which the major concern is not race. For instance, Claudia Tate describes the issue as "merely a mechanism for setting the story in motion, sustaining the suspense, and bringing about the external circumstances for the story's conclusion."

Catherine Rottenberg argues that Larsen's novella is a prime example of race and gender norms portrayed in the US. The main characters, Irene and Clare, and their struggle with their own identification problems in the novel, help readers understand the difference between gender and race norms. These two central characters are able to pass as white women even though Irene does not fully pass over, and Rottenberg argues the difference between Clare and Irene by re-evaluating the idea of desire/identification. The misidentification Clare deals with stems from her re-connection with Irene after twelve years of not speaking. Seeing Irene sparked a desire in Clare for her to get back in touch with her African-American culture. Irene's identification trouble is associated with her need to feel safe and in control in her life, the main reason Irene chooses to pass over only on occasion. Irene doesn't want to put herself into a dangerous situation.

=== Class ===
Race is not the only primary concern in Nella Larsen's Passing. Class is also a major aspect that is simultaneously developed. Both of the main characters Irene Redfield and Clare Kendry present a strong sense of class. They also demonstrate how they cross clearly defined class borders in order to obtain more power in their life.

==== Zulena ====
Scholarly critics such as Mary Wilson have examined the character of Irene's maid Zulena, who demonstrates the middle-class African-American family in the 1920s. Irene opposed the idea of discrimination and racism towards the blacks but when it came to maintaining her social class she preferred domesticity and servitude even if it was from the people from her own black race. Domesticity in the South was often associated with the black woman but Irene decides to maintain the power and class through the servitude of another black woman. Wilson examines that the differences in class were not just embedded in the black versus white society but also within the single black race. Such difference can be seen as a conflict between Irene's ideology and her actions when it comes to maintaining her status as a middle-class African-American. The class privilege is well-defined through the skin color as Zulena is described as a "mahogany-colored creature" which meant that she had no chance to pass like Irene as, if not "white", than something other than African-American, and it automatically decides the role for the black colored woman to serve as a maid and belong to the inferior class. Although Irene calls herself black, having an ability to pass as white makes her behave like a white privileged woman because she happily accepts the servitude complicating the issue of race and class. Larsen introduces Zulena in the story as a "colored creature", primarily from Irene's perspective, suggesting that Irene considers her servant as from an inferior class and therefore decides to keep a certain distance from her.

==== Clare Kendry ====
Clare Kendry crosses social class binaries. Clare does not inhabit any particular social class but rather lives as both a working-class and a middle-class woman in the novel. Clare is born in a working-class family where her father is a janitor of the building that she lives in. In adulthood, she passes during her marriage to obtain the lifestyle of an upper-middle-class woman. Despite having the luxury and comfort that she has always wanted but never had had in her childhood, Clare still longs for her childhood experiences and constantly visits Irene and her maid Zulena. Because Clare shares many experiences of the working-class, she feels very comfortable when talking to Zulena, going further than Irene by perceiving her as an equal and friend. Clare's desire to live in both social classes at the same time shows how these class boundaries are fluid.

==== Irene Redfield ====
While Clare demonstrates her class binaries, Irene is very protective towards her own status quo. Irene grew up as a middle-class person and continues to live as such after marrying a doctor. Irene is more hesitant to cross between middle-class and working-class; she isolates herself and avoids all of the circumstances that she might be mistaken for a lower-class person. For example, during Irene's attempt to pass to become an elite white woman at Drayton hotel, she makes a clear distinction between herself and working-class individuals by showing her desire to be separated from the "sweating masses". Irene is also concerned that people at the Negro League Dance might mistake Clare for a prostitute. Throughout the novel, Irene seems comfortable living in a higher social class while Clare constantly crosses between the two classes.

=== Eugenic ideology ===
Scholar Sami Schalk argues that the notion of eugenic ideology emerges in the novel. Eugenic ideology assigns specific behavioral and physical traits to different distinctions of race, class, gender, and sexual identity. Both physical and behavioral features of this ideology are discussed by the main characters in Passing, Irene and Clare. For example, several times in the novel, Irene acknowledges the way white people racially designate physical traits to African Americans in order to identify them. The concept of eugenic ideology also emerges when Clare's aunts assign her to a domestic servant role believing this would align with her skin color. Thus, the aunt's perceptions of Clare's work are distinctly categorized through race.

Schalk further suggests that the novel resists these notions of eugenic ideology by emphasizing how characters pass fluidly between racial identities and resist clear categories of identity. In the novel, Clare Kendry hides her racial identity from her husband and is able to travel to places where African Americans are not allowed entry because no one can denote her black heritage from her behavior. In addition, Irene notes several times in the novel that the physical traits white people assign to African Americans are ridiculous. She, too, is able to pass in places where African Americans are not allowed entry and therefore defies racial categorization. The novel resists eugenic distinctions by highlighting the fluid transitions between races.

=== Sexuality ===
==== Repression ====
Scholars have treated "sexuality" with caution and reticence especially during the Harlem Renaissance because of the history of slavery and the objectification of black women. Black novelists, especially female black novelists, had to be more discreet when writing about the sexuality of their characters. During this time, women, especially black women, were used as sexual objects. Due to sexual objectification, black novelists wanted to overcome the legacy of rape. They wanted to end the stereotypes of black women as "sexual objects" and to return to the "timidity and modesty" of Negro womanhood. The writers didn't want to repeat the experience of women's oppression, especially African-American women. McDowell believes that during the Harlem Renaissance female sexuality was acknowledged only in the advertising, beauty, and fashion industries, and "sexual pleasure, especially for black women, leads to the dangers of domination in marriage, repeated pregnancy, or exploitation and loss of status."

According to scholar Deborah McDowell, Larsen wanted to tell the story of black women with sexual desires, but the novelist also had to be constrained in that she wanted to establish "black women as respectable" in black middle-class terms. As an example, in the novel, Irene is portrayed as sexually repressed. Irene has a tenuous relationship with her husband Brian. In fact, they have separate rooms. McDowell believes that Irene is confused by her sexual feelings for Clare, which are much more apparent. McDowell argues that the story is about "Irene's awakening sexual desire towards Clare".

==== Homosexuality ====
Scholars have identified a homoerotic subtext between Irene and Clare, centered on the erotic undertones in Irene's descriptions of Clare and appreciation of her beauty. As scholar Deborah McDowell's writes "the idea of bringing sexual attraction between two women to full narrative expression is, likewise, too dangerous a move, which helps to explain why critics have missed this aspect of the novel". In that interpretation, the novel's central metaphor of "passing" under a different identity "occurs at a surprisingly wide variety of levels," including sexual. This suggests that there are other forms of "passing" that take place in the novel that is not just based on race. Larsen has a clever way of "deriving its surface theme and central metaphor-passing", disguising the plots "neatly" and "symmetrically". The apparently sexless marriage between Brian and Irene (their separate bedrooms and identification as co-parents rather than sexual partners) allow Larsen to "flirt, if only by suggestion, with the idea of a lesbian relationship between [Clare and Irene]." In the novel, these sexual innuendos appear when Irene first lays eyes on Clare at the rooftop of the Drayton Hotel. The novel describes Clare as "a sweetly scented woman in a fluttering dress of green chiffon whose mingled pattern of narcissuses, jonquils, and hyacinths was a reminder of pleasantly chill spring days". These flowers symbolize the attraction Irene has for Clare. Jonquils and narcissus, both represent an excessive interest in one's physical appearance. This alludes to Irene's obsession and physical attraction for Clare. As the novel states, "from the very beginning of their re-encounter, Irene is drawn to Clare like a moth to a flame".

The character of her husband, Brian, has been subject to a similar interpretation: Irene's labeling of him as queer and his oft-expressed desire to go to Brazil, a country then widely thought to be more tolerant of homosexuality than the United States was, are given as evidence. It is also shown that Brazil is considered to be a place with more relaxed ideas about race. Irene begins to believe that Clare and Brian are having an affair to hide or distract from her own feelings for Clare. McDowell writes, "the awakening of Irene's erotic feelings for Clare coincides with Irene's imagination of an affair between Clare and Brian". Although she had no reason to accuse him, Irene did so to protect herself from her own sexual desires.

=== Jealousy ===
Scholars such as Claudia Tate and Helena Michie suggest there is a theme of jealousy throughout the novel. Both point to Irene's jealousy in terms of her appreciation for Clare's charisma and desirable appearance in the novel. As Clare meets Irene to go to the Negro Welfare League dance, Irene feels "dowdy and commonplace" in comparison to Clare, who she sees as "exquisite, golden, fragrant, flaunting." The scholars stress that there are two aspects to this jealousy, with Irene exhibiting both bitterness in her perception of Clare, and simultaneously, feelings of affection and desire for her. Helena Michie categorizes the relationship as "sororophobic", a term she defines as a "fear of one's sister." While Irene expresses jealousy in her admiration of Clare's beauty and social charms, she is also susceptible to their seduction and eventually begins to suspect that her husband Brian might be influenced by them as well. In her intensifying suspicions, Irene's jealousy develops into a fear of losing her family, and with it, the identity she has built for herself as a middle class black woman. Irene displays it here when deciding whether to expose Clare or not "She was caught between two allegiances, different, yet the same. Herself. Her race. Race! The thing that bound and suffocated her. Whatever steps she took, or if she took none at all, something would be crushed. A person or the race. Clare, herself, or the race. Or, it might be, all three. Nothing, she imagined, was ever more completely sardonic." Larsen uses jealousy as the main source of conflict in the novel, and uses race as a vehicle for Irene to potentially rid herself of Clare. At this point in the story Irene realizes she can expose Clare's true racial identity to remove Clare from her life, and regain that security she desires more than anything. Albeit she feels jealousy and fear, out of loyalty for her race, Irene does not follow through with her thoughts of exposing Clare.

While the novel primarily focuses on Irene's feelings of jealousy, Clare is also shown to be envious of Irene. Unlike Irene, however, Clare exhibits jealousy towards Irene's lifestyle. Clare perceives Irene as being close to her blackness and her community, a state that Clare has previously chosen to leave behind but strives to experience again. As Clare and Irene converse during Clare's first visit to Irene's home, Clare expresses her loneliness to Irene, contrasting her view of Irene's condition to Clare's own feelings of isolation: "'How could you know? How could you? You're free. You're happy.'" Clare expresses her own jealousy outwardly, even as the novel centers on Irene's inner turmoil.

=== Whiteness ===
Scholars such as Catherine Rottenberg examine how Larsen's characters struggle against race and gender norms of "whiteness" in the United States. Rottenberg shows how the main characters in the novel confront normative characteristics of white culture. Clare chooses to identify with the white culture. Irene, who identifies as an African American, chooses to pass when she feels the need to blend into white culture. The essence of Rottenberg's scholarship shows how the novel's characters struggle against the desire for whiteness because of the positive stereotypes society has created around "white" identity. Clare's experience growing up with her white aunts, who treated her as a servant, directly impacts Clare's initial desire towards whiteness. Hence, she passes as a white woman, marries a white man, and forgets her African-American culture. Even though as a society the white race is the desirable race, Rottenberg explains how there are limitations put into place so the inferior race can never fully be white. For example, Clare has this desire to pass as a white woman because she believes that is the only way she will have a social power, but after reconnecting with her childhood friend Irene, she begins to struggle with her misplaced desire for whiteness and returns to her African-American identification. Seeing Irene sparks a desire in Clare to get back in touch with her African-American culture. Similarly, Irene identifies as black, but because she desires to feel safe and in control at all times in her life, she chooses to pass over only on occasion. Irene's desire to be white comes from her wanting the middle-class lifestyle because it will give her the security she needs. Irene doesn't want to put herself into a dangerous situation, which in a way, makes her feel like her marriage and the life she knows at risk. Throughout Larsen's novel Rottenberg explains how Clare has evolved from wanting to achieve whiteness to reconnecting with the African-American culture, while Irene still has a desire to achieve "whiteness" to feel secure.

=== Middle-class security ===
Scholars such as Andrew W. Davis and Zahirah Sabir acknowledge Irene's psychology of safety and security, which likely originated from "the threat of racism" surrounding her family. In the novel, Irene states that she places security as the first priority in her life, on top of race and friendship in the novel.

Davis states that the reason that Irene prioritizes security is she wants to protect her children from the social prejudices of the time. In addition, Irene wants Brian, her husband, to stay in New York as a doctor to provide security for her children. When Brian desires to leave for Brazil, Irene is anxious due to the fact that New York is still a white society, and is a familiar to her as an African-American middle-class woman. Clare's presence in Irene's life is a threat to this security. It makes Irene sense the insecurity of her marriage with her husband, Brian. And, it makes her acknowledge the reality of questions of race and class that surround her and her children's life.

== Critical reception ==
"Passing" is on the whole an effective and convincing attempt to portray certain aspects of a vexatious problem. The fact that it is by a girl who is partly of negro blood adds to the effectiveness ...

— Anonymous, 1929

Passing was published in April 1929 by Knopf in New York City. Sales of the book were modest: Knopf produced three small print runs each under 2,000 copies. While early reviews were primarily positive, it received little attention beyond New York City.

Comparing it to Larsen's previous novel Quicksand, Alice Dunbar-Nelson's review in The Washington Eagle began by declaring that "Nella Larsen delights again with her new novel". Writer and scholar W. E. B. Du Bois hailed it as "one of the finest novels of the year" and believed that its limited success was due to its treating a "forbidden subject," the marriage of a white man to a mixed-race girl who did not reveal her ancestry.

A common criticism of the novel is that it ends too suddenly, without a full exploration of the issues it raises. Mary Rennels, writing in the New York Telegram, said, "Larsen didn't solve the problem [of passing]. Knocking a character out of a scene doesn't settle a matter." An anonymous reviewer for the New York Times Book Review similarly concluded that "the most serious fault with the book is its sudden and utterly unconvincing close", but otherwise considered it an effective treatment of the topic. On the other hand, Dunbar-Nelson found that the ending confirmed to the reader that "you have been reading a masterpiece all along."

In modern scholarship, Larsen is recognized as one of the central figures in the African-American, feminist and modernist canons, a reputation that is based on her two novels (Passing and Quicksand) and some short stories. As of 2007, Passing is the subject of more than 200 scholarly articles and more than 50 dissertations, which offer a range of critical interpretations. It has been hailed as a text helping to "create a modernist psychological interiority ... challenging marriage and middle-class domesticity, complexly interrogating gender, race, and sexual identity, and for redeploying traditional tropes—such as that of the tragic mulatta—with a contemporary and critical twist." However, literary critic Cheryl Wall summarizes the critical response to Passing as less favorable than to Larsen's first novel Quicksand. On one hand, the significance of sexual jealousy in the story has been seen to detract from the topic of racial passing; conversely, even if racial passing is accurately treated in the novel, it is considered a historically specific practice and so Passing appears dated and trivial.

The novel has been translated into numerous languages including Danish, German, French, Spanish, Arabic, Hebrew, Japanese, and Italian.

== Film adaptation ==
The novel was adapted into a 2021 film of the same name by director Rebecca Hall. It had its world premiere at the 2021 Sundance Film Festival on January 30, 2021, and was released by Netflix later in the year.
