= Biographical criticism =

Form of literary criticism

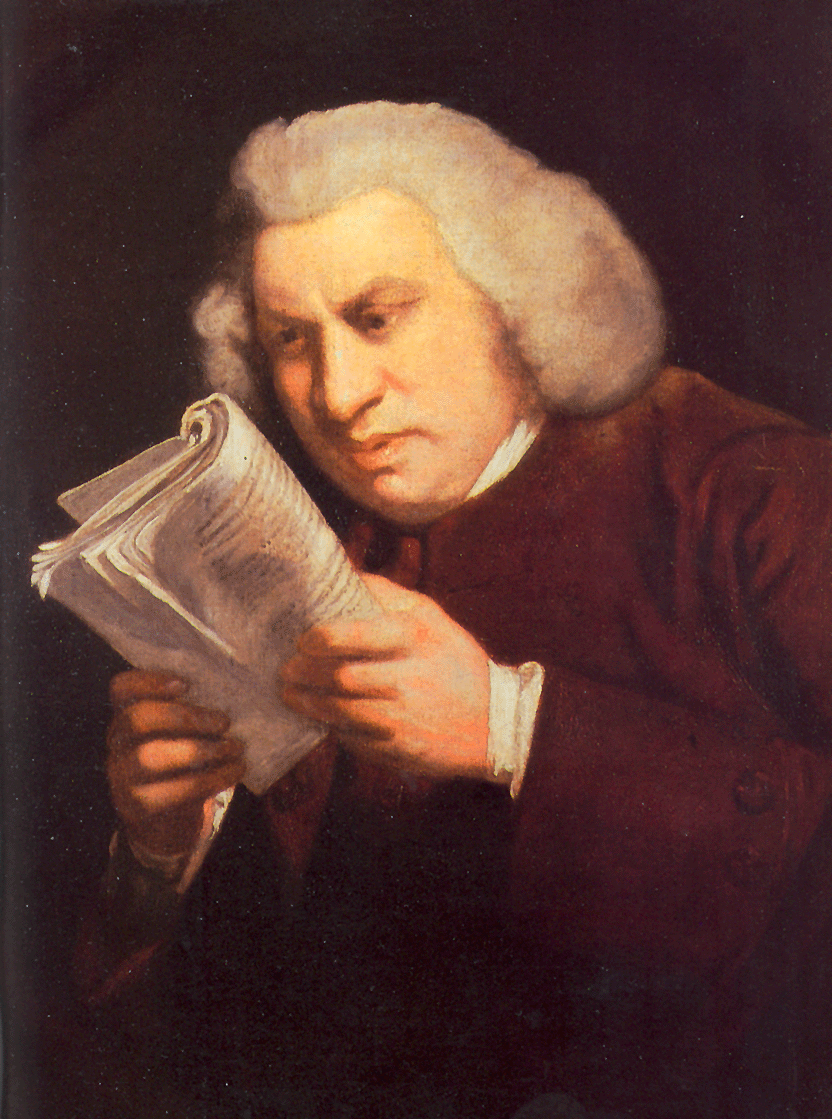
Samuel Johnson's Lives of the Poets (1779–81) was possibly the first thorough-going exercise in a biographical criticism.

Biographical criticism is a form of literary criticism which analyzes a writer's biography to show the relationship between the author's life and their literary works. Biographical criticism is often associated with historical-biographical criticism, a critical method that "sees a literary work chiefly, if not exclusively, as a reflection of its author's life and times".

This longstanding critical method dates back at least to the Renaissance period, and was employed extensively by Samuel Johnson in his Lives of the Poets (1779–81).

Like any critical methodology, biographical criticism can be used with discretion and insight or employed as a superficial shortcut to understanding the literary work on its own terms through such strategies as Formalism. Hence 19th century biographical criticism came under disapproval by the so-called New Critics of the 1920s, who coined the term "biographical fallacy" to describe criticism that neglected the imaginative genesis of literature.

Notwithstanding this critique, biographical criticism remained a significant mode of literary inquiry throughout the 20th century, particularly in studies of Charles Dickens and F. Scott Fitzgerald, among others. The method continues to be employed in the study of such authors as John Steinbeck, Walt Whitman and William Shakespeare.

== Peripatetic biographical criticism ==
In The Cambridge history of literary criticism: Classical criticism, in a chapter titled "Peripatetic Biographical Criticism", George Alexander Kennedy notes that in the Hellenistic age, "The works of authors were read as sources of information about their lives, personalities and interests. Some of this material was then used by other commentators and critics to explain passages in their works. The process became a circular one in that, though Peripatetic biographers utilized external evidence where available, they had little to go on and quarried the texts for hints".

== Recognition of otherness ==
Jackson J. Benson describes the form as a "'recognition of 'otherness'—that there is an author who is different in personality and background from the reader—appears to be a simple-minded proposition. Yet as a basic prerequisite to the understanding and evaluation of a literary text it is often ignored even by the most sophisticated literary critics. The exploration of otherness is what literary biography and biographical criticism can do best, discovering an author as a unique individual, a discovery that puts a burden on us to reach out to recognize that uniqueness before we can fully comprehend an author's writings.'"

== Connections to other modes of criticism ==
Biographical criticism shares in common with New Historicism an interest in the fact that all literary works are situated in specific historical and biographical contexts from which they are generated. Biographical Criticism, like New Historicism, rejects the concept that literary studies should be limited to the internal or formal characteristics of a literary work, and insists that it properly includes a knowledge of the contexts in which the work was created. Biographical criticism stands in ambiguous relationship to Romanticism. It has often been argued that it is a development from Romanticism, but it also stands in opposition to the Romantic tendency to view literature as manifesting a "universal" transcendence of the particular conditions of its genesis.

== Assessments of biographical criticism and literary biography ==
In The Art of Literary Biography (1995), John Worthen writes:

'The fact that we want an emergent sense of the inevitable development suggests the enormously soothing quality which biographies have come to have in our age. Not only do biographies suggest that things as difficult as human lives can – for all their obvious complexity – be summed up, known, comprehended: they reassure us that, while we are reading, a world will be created in which there are few or no unclear motives, muddled decisions, or (indeed) loose ends.'

In "The Uses of Biography" (2016), George B. Hutchinson writes:

'Despite the low prestige of biographical criticism, we all use biographies. We want to know where people are from, how old they are, and usually by whom they were raised. Virtually all criticism, including criticism by poststructuralist critics, has a crucial biographical component that helps frame interpretation. We routinely situate authors in space and time before any interpretation begins and read them in relation to other authors to whom they may have been responding. Moreover, biographical sleuthing turns up evidence sometimes of such import that it completely changes our notions of a text or of an author. Where, for example, did scholars situate Incidents in the Life of a Slave Girl before Jean Fagan Yellin proved that the author was black?'

== See also ==
- Biography in literature
