= Atkinson Center for a Sustainable Future =

Cornell Atkinson Center for Sustainability

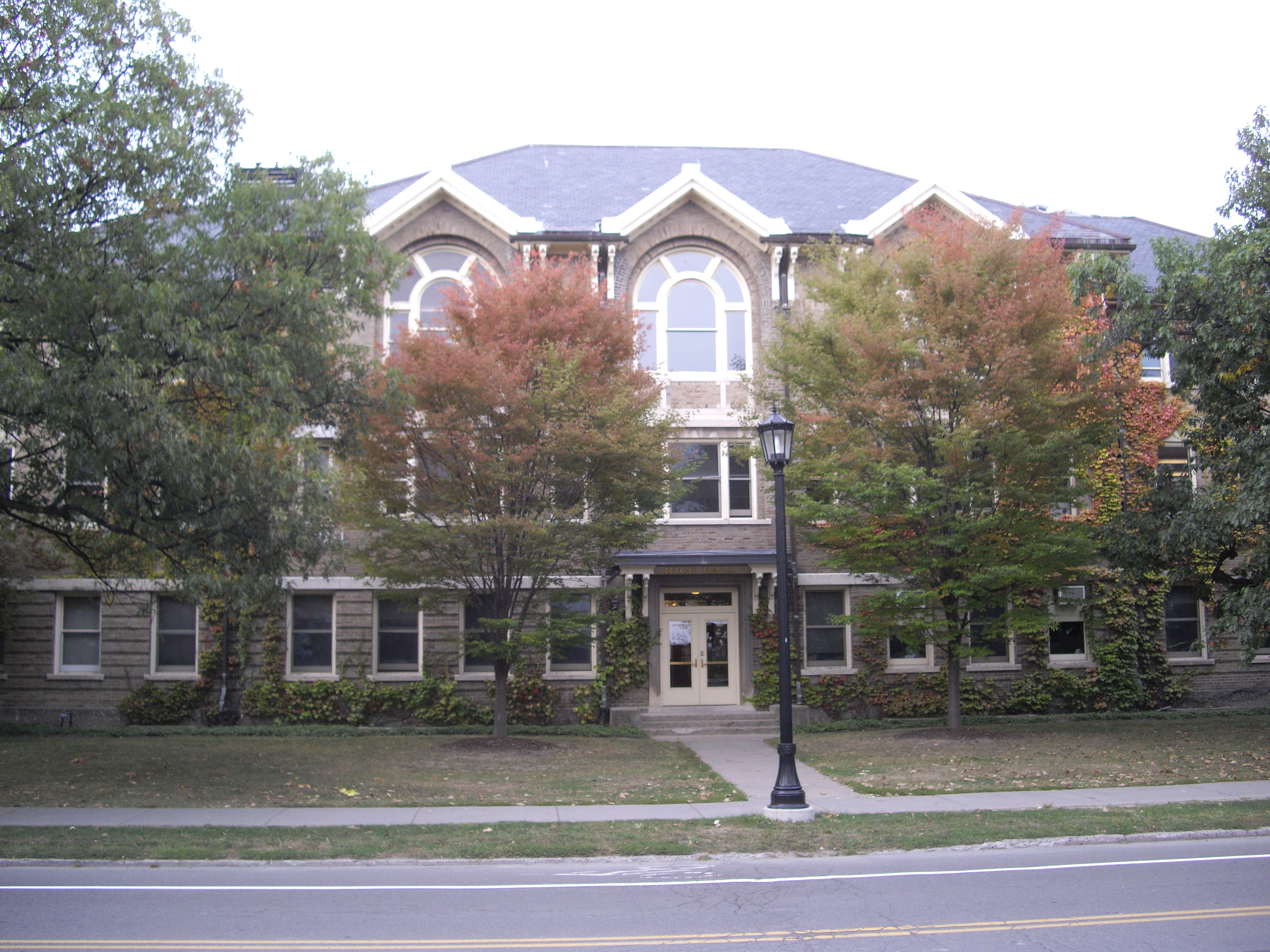
- The Atkinson Center in Rice Hall on the campus of Cornell University
- Type: Research Organization
- Predecessor: Cornell Atkinson Center for Sustainability
- Founded: 2010
- Headquarters: 103 Atkinson Hall, Cornell University, Ithaca, New York, 14850
- Key people: David Lodge, The Francis J. DiSalvo Director
- Parent: Cornell University
- Website: atkinson.cornell.edu

The Cornell Atkinson Center for Sustainability is the center for collaborative sustainability research at Cornell University, forging connections among researchers, students, staff, and external partners. The center’s funding and programming accelerate research within and across all of Cornell’s colleges and schools. In turn, the center is the university’s home to new ideas and models .

== History ==
Cornell Atkinson Center for Sustainability grew out of the Cornell Center for a Sustainable Future (CCSF), which was established in 2007 as a pilot program with support from alumnus David R. Atkinson '60 and his wife Patricia following a multiyear, cross-campus discussion about energy and sustainability. In 2010, the Atkinsons endowed the center with an $80 million gift, making it the largest gift ever received from an individual at Cornell University at that time.

Recognizing that sustainability solutions cannot be limited to one field of inquiry and that discovery in one area may affect other parts of the whole, the center is home to 514 Faculty Fellows representing 12 Cornell University colleges and 90 departments.

By providing startup funding for cross-college collaborations, time-sensitive research, and external partnerships, the center supports discovery with real-world impact in food systems, energy transitions, climate, behavior, the built environment, and the linkages between human and environmental health.

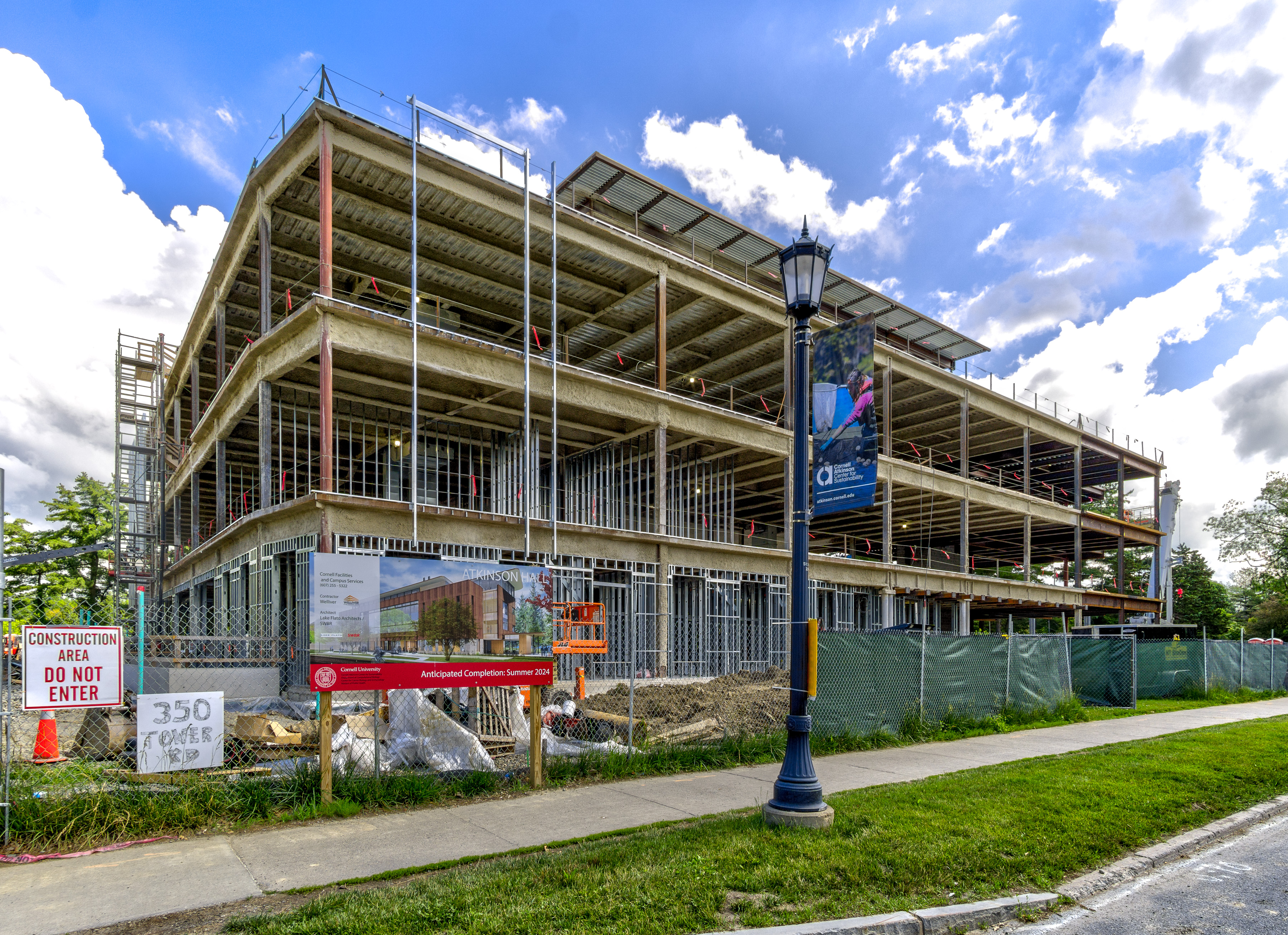
Atkinson Hall under construction in June 2023

Construction on a new building to house the Center was announced in 2021, and completed in 2025.

== Research Support ==
The Atkinson Center supports Cornell University researchers through multiple funds and fellowships:

- Academic Venture Fund—The Academic Venture Fund (AVF) seeds original, multidisciplinary research that is not likely to find funding elsewhere because the projects are novel, risky, need early data to establish traction, or involve new teams working together.
- Innovation for Impact Fund—The Innovation for Impact Fund (IIF) connects our nonprofit, government, and industry partners with the research capacity of Cornell to jointly develop and test evidence-based solutions. Current collaborators include CARE, The Nature Conservancy, Environmental Defense Fund, Avangrid, and the Smithsonian Conservation Biology Institute.
- Rapid Response Fund—The Rapid Response Fund (RRF) facilitates urgent or time-sensitive sustainability research, workshops, and other activities. With unusually flexible guidelines, the RRF is a source of funding for smaller projects that foster a broad range of sustainability initiatives.
- Faculty Fellowship for Social Sciences, Humanities, and Arts—The Social Sciences, Humanities, and Arts (SSHA) Faculty Fellows Fund adds a unique and invaluable perspective by reshaping imaginations, behaviors, and minds. This work complements and extends the center’s sustainability advances in the life, physical, environmental, and agricultural sciences.

== Partner Organizations ==
Partner organizations include but are not limited to:

- CARE—This collaboration connects Atkinson Center research teams with CARE staff on the ground in communities around the world, speeding delivery of science-based solutions. Cornell scientists also provide background research to inform CARE positions on policy issues related to international food assistance and relief aid.
- Environmental Defense Fund (EDF)—The center's work with Environmental Defense Fund includes joint research activities and an undergraduate internship program. The research program leverages Cornell research expertise with EDF's leadership in the policy arena. The internship program places Cornell students in EDF offices around the world to work on complex projects.
- Oxfam America—This collaboration of the Atkinson Center, Clark University, and Oxfam America looks to identify common threads in evaluating rural resilience around the world.
- The Nature Conservancy (TNC)—In partnership with the Atkinson Center and five other leading universities, The Nature Conservancy established a NatureNet Science Fellows program to create a reservoir of next-generation interdisciplinary science talent. The fellowships are awarded annually to six outstanding early-career scientists working at the interface of conservation, business, and technology.
- Smithsonian Institution—This comprehensive collaboration between the Atkinson Center and the world’s largest museum and research complex responds to urgent needs in wildlife and natural habitat conservation. Together, experts from the center and the Smithsonian Conservation Biology Institute are training the next generation of conservation scientists, providing practical advice to governments and the private sector in biodiversity hot spots, and sharing evidence with a wide audience that wildlife and natural habitat conservation improves all lives.

== See also ==
- Sustainable development
- Climate change
- Sustainability
- Cornell University
