= Nella Larsen =

American novelist (1891–1964)

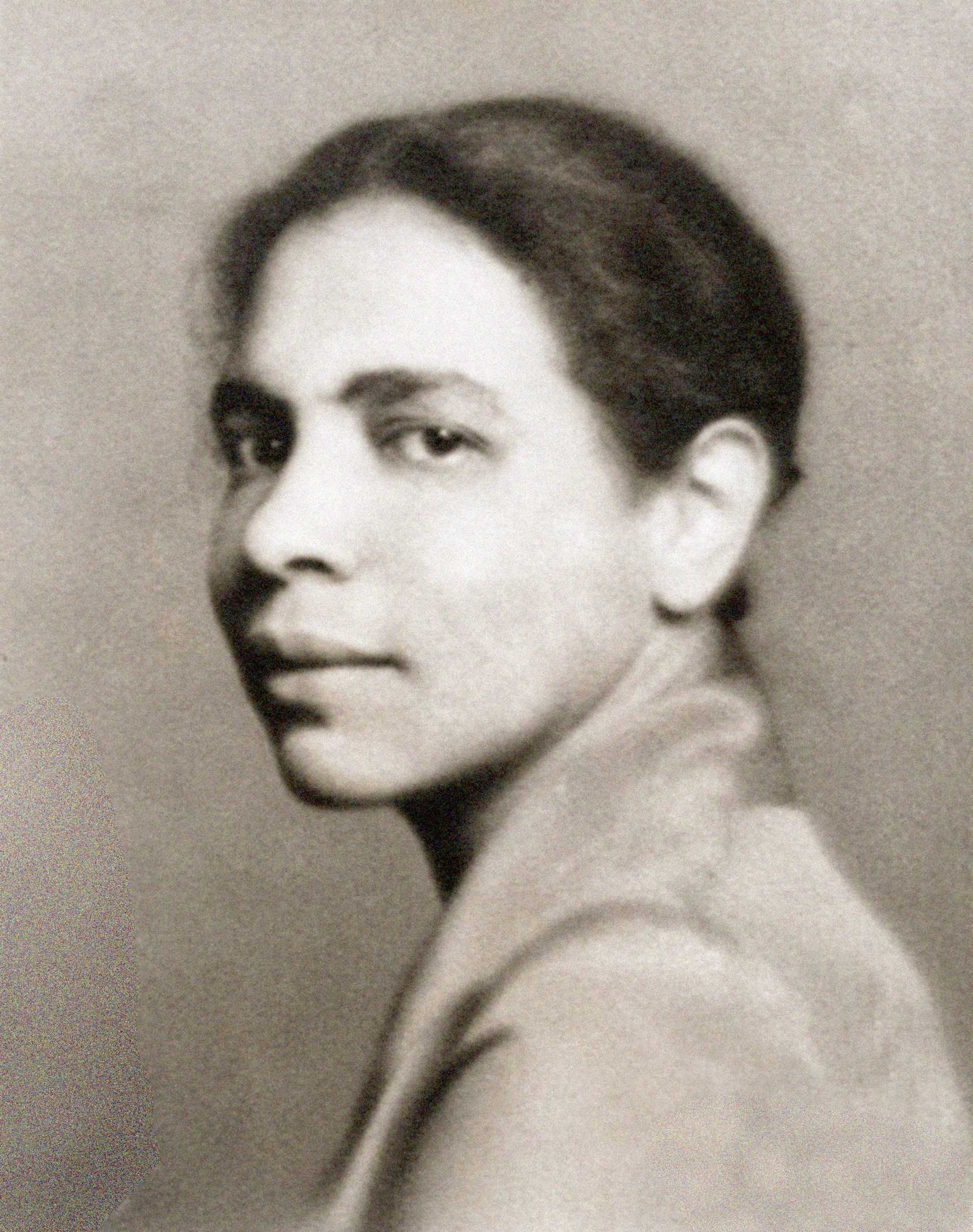
- Larsen in 1928
- Born: Nellie Walker; April 13, 1891; Chicago, Illinois, U.S.
- Died: March 30, 1964 (aged 72); New York City, U.S.
- Other names: Nellallitea Larsen; Nellye Larson; Nellie Larsen; Nella Larsen Imes
- Education: Fisk University (No degree); University of Copenhagen (Audited classes); Lincoln Hospital (Nursing degree); New York Public Library (Library science certificate)
- Occupations: Novelist; librarian; nurse
- Notable work: Quicksand (1928); Passing (1929)
- Movement: Harlem Renaissance; American modernism
- Spouse: Elmer Imes (m. 1919; div. 1933)
- Awards: Guggenheim Fellowship

Nella Larsen (born Nellie Walker; April 13, 1891 – March 30, 1964) was an American novelist, nurse, and librarian. She published two novels—Quicksand (1928) and Passing (1929)—and a few short stories.

A revival of interest in her writing has occurred since the late 20th century. Her works have been the subjects of numerous academic studies involving issues of racial and sexual identity, and she has been lauded as "not only the premier novelist of the Harlem Renaissance, but also an important figure in American modernism."

== Early life and education ==
Nella Larsen was born Nellie Walker, in a poor district of south Chicago known as the Levee, on April 13, 1891 (though Larsen would frequently claim to have been born in 1893). Her mother was Pederline Marie Hansen, an ethnically Danish immigrant, born in 1868 in Bernstorfsminde, a small hamlet in the parish of Brahetrolleborg. Migrating to the USA around 1886 and going by the name Mary, Larsen's mother worked as a seamstress and domestic worker in Chicago.

Larsen's father was Peter Walker, a "colored" immigrant from the Danish West Indies (now the U.S. Virgin Islands). Walker and Hansen filed an application for a marriage license in 1891, indicating a clear intent to marry around the time Nella Larsen was born. Despite the application, an actual license or record of the ceremony has not been found in historical archives. Walker was probably a descendant on his paternal side of Henry or George Walker, white men from Albany, New York, who were known to have settled in the Danish West Indies in about 1840. In the Danish West Indies, the law did not recognise racial difference, and racial lines were more fluid than in the former slave states of the United States. Walker may never have identified as "Negro." He abandoned the family within a year of Nella's birth. Following his disappearance, he effectively vanished from the historical record. She said he had died when she was very young. At this time, Chicago was filled with immigrants, but the Great Migration of Black people from the South had not begun. Near the end of Walker's childhood, the Black population of the city was 1.3% in 1890 and 2% in 1910.

Larsen's mother then married Peter Larsen (A.K.A. Larson, b. 1867), a fellow Danish immigrant, in November 1898—six years after the birth of their first daughter together and seven years after the disappearance of Peter Walker. Some have hypothesized that Larsen’s biological father and her stepfather were actually the same man "passing" for white, while others have argued that they were two distinct individuals. In 1892 the couple had a daughter, Anna Elizabeth, also known as Lizzie (married name Gardner). Nellie took her stepfather's surname, sometimes using versions spelled Nellye Larson and Nellie Larsen, before settling finally on Nella Larsen. The mixed family moved to a mostly white neighborhood of German and Scandinavian immigrants on the South Side of Chicago, but encountered discrimination because of Nella.

The American author and critic Darryl Pinckney wrote of her anomalous situation:

as a member of a white immigrant family, she [Larsen] had no entrée into the world of the blues or of the black church. If she could never be white like her mother and sister, neither could she ever be black in quite the same way that Langston Hughes and his characters were black. Hers was a netherworld, unrecognizable historically and too painful to dredge up.

From 1895 to 1898, Larsen lived in Denmark with her mother and her half-sister. During this time, she lived in a provincial setting—likely the hamlet of Askov in Jutland. Her grandmother, Karen Mandrupsen Hansen, died in October 1897 while she was there. Though she was unusual in Denmark because of being of mixed race, she had some good memories from that time, including playing Danish children’s games, which she later wrote about in English. After returning to Chicago, she attended Wendell Phillips High School, a large public school, from 1905-7. At the same time as the migration of Southern blacks increased to the city, so had European immigration. Racial segregation and tensions had increased in the immigrant neighborhoods, where both groups competed for jobs and housing.

In 1907, the family moved to a neighborhood near the Chicago Normal School, though Nella never attended that school, instead being sent to the Fisk University Normal School in Nashville around 1907. Her mother believed that education could give her an opportunity and supported her in attending Fisk, a historically black university. At Fisk, Larsen was living within an African-American community for the first time, but she was still separated by her own background and life experiences from most of the students, who were primarily from the South, with most descended from former slaves. Professor George B. Hutchinson established that Larsen was expelled, along with ten other women, inferring that this was for some violation of Fisk's strict dress or conduct codes for women. Larsen went on her own to Denmark, where she lived for a total of three years, between 1909 and 1912, and attended the University of Copenhagen, though she did not formally enroll as a regular student.

== Nursing career ==
In 1912, Larsen enrolled in the nursing school at New York City's Lincoln Hospital and Nursing Home, an institution that was founded in the 19th century in Manhattan as a nursing home to serve black people, whose hospital services had grown in importance. The total operation had been relocated to a newly constructed campus in the South Bronx. At the time, the hospital patients were primarily white; the nursing home patients were primarily black; the doctors were white males; and the nurses and nursing students were black females.

Upon graduating from nursing training school in 1915, Larsen went South to work at the Tuskegee Institute in Tuskegee, Alabama, where she soon became head nurse at its John A. Andrew Memorial Hospital and training school. While at Tuskegee, she was introduced to Booker T. Washington's model of education and became disillusioned with it. As it was combined with poor working conditions for nurses at Tuskegee, Larsen decided to leave after a year or so.

She returned to New York in 1916, where she worked for two years as a nurse at Lincoln Hospital. After earning the second-highest score on a civil service exam, Larsen was hired by the city Bureau of Public Health as a nurse. She worked for them in the Bronx through the 1918 flu pandemic, in "mostly white neighborhoods" and with white colleagues. Afterwards she continued with the city as a nurse.

== Marriage and family ==
In 1919, Larsen married Elmer Imes, a prominent physicist; he was the second African American to earn a PhD in physics. After her marriage, she sometimes used the name Nella Larsen Imes in her writing. A year after her marriage, she published her first short stories.

The couple moved to Harlem in the 1920s, where their marriage and life together had contradictions of class. As Pinckney writes:

By virtue of her marriage, she was a member of Harlem's black professional class, many of them people of color with partially European ancestry. She and her husband knew the NAACP leadership: W.E.B. Du Bois, Walter White, James Weldon Johnson. However, because of her low birth and mixed parentage, and because she did not have a college degree, Larsen was alienated from the black middle class, whose members emphasized college and family ties, and black fraternities and sororities.

Her mixed racial ancestry was not itself unusual in the black middle class. But many of these individuals, such as Langston Hughes, had more distant European ancestors. He and others formed an elite of mixed race or people of color, some of whom had ancestors who had been free people of color well before the American Civil War. This had given many families an advantage in establishing themselves and gaining educations in the North. In the 1920s, most African Americans in Harlem were exploring and emphasizing their black heritage.

Imes's scientific studies and achievement placed him in a different class than Larsen. The Imes couple had difficulties by the late 1920s, when he had an affair with a white woman at Fisk University, where he was a professor. Imes and Larsen would divorce in 1933.

== Librarian and literary career ==
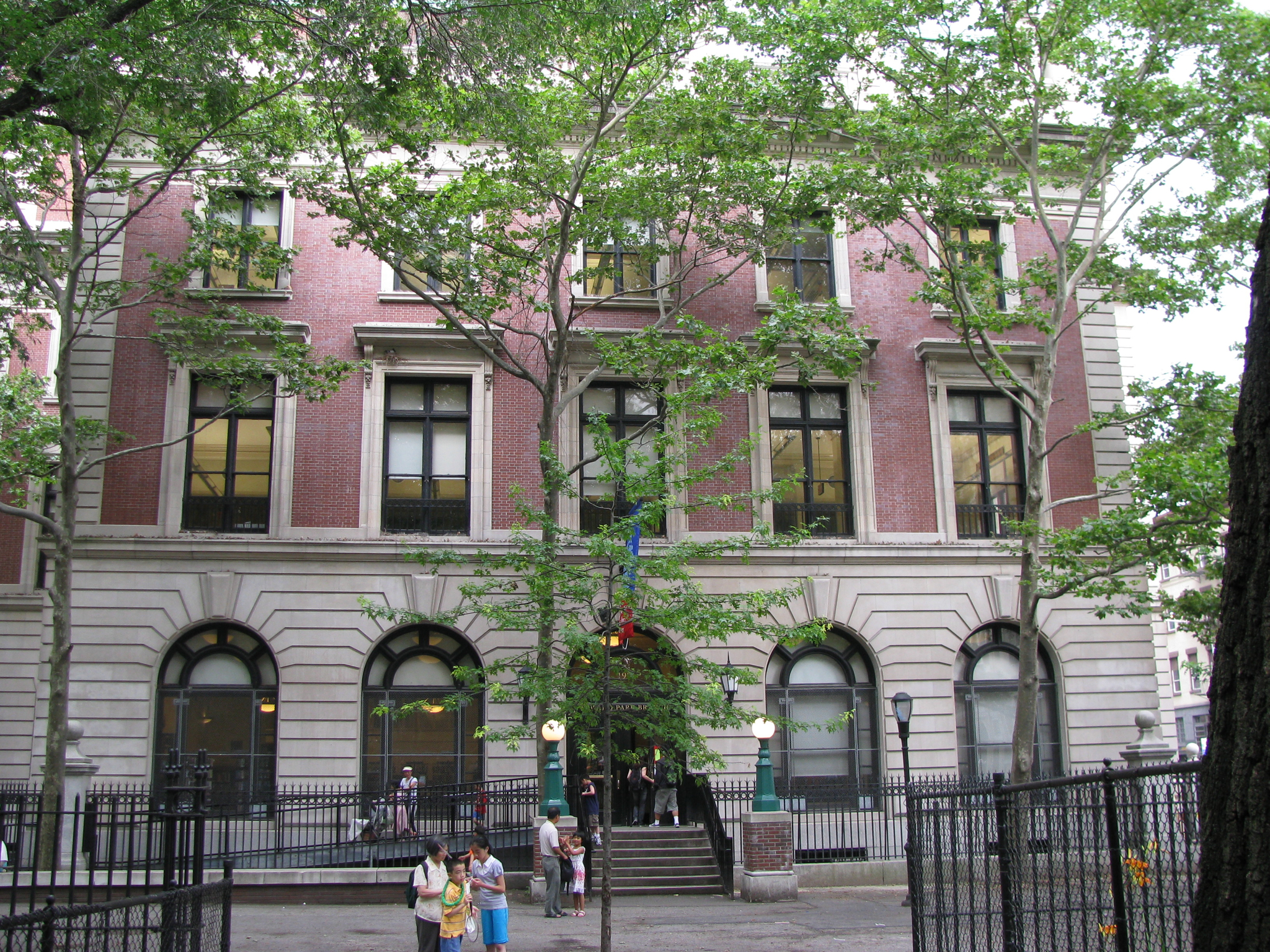
Seward Park Library where Larsen worked

In 1921, Larsen worked nights and weekends as a volunteer with librarian Ernestine Rose, to help prepare for the first exhibit of "Negro art" at the New York Public Library (NYPL). Encouraged by Rose, she became the first black woman to graduate from the NYPL Library School. It was run by Columbia University and opened the way for integration of library staff.

Larsen passed her certification exam in 1923. She worked her first year as a librarian at the Seward Park Branch on the Lower East Side, which was predominantly Jewish. There she had strong support from her white supervisor Alice Keats O'Connor, as she had from Rose. They, and another branch supervisor where she worked, supported Larsen and helped integrate the staff of the branches. Larsen transferred to the Harlem branch, as she was interested in the cultural excitement in the African-American neighborhood, a destination for migrants from across the country.

In October 1925, Larsen took a sabbatical from her job for health reasons and began to write her first novel. In 1926, having made friends with important figures in the Negro Awakening (which became known as the Harlem Renaissance), Larsen gave up her work as a librarian. She published short fiction under the pseudonym "Allen Semi" (an anagram of her married name, Nella Imes) in 1926.

She became a writer active in Harlem's interracial literary and arts community, where she became friends with Carl Van Vechten, a white photographer and writer. In 1928, Larsen published Quicksand, a largely autobiographical novel. It received significant critical acclaim, if not great financial success.

In 1929, she published Passing, her second novel, which was also critically successful. It dealt with issues of two mixed-race African-American women who were childhood friends and had taken different paths of racial identification and marriage. One identified as black and married a black doctor; the other passed as white and married a white man, without revealing her African ancestry. The book explored their experiences of coming together again as adults.

In 1930, Larsen published "Sanctuary", a short story for which she was accused of plagiarism. "Sanctuary" was said to resemble the British writer Sheila Kaye-Smith's 1919 short story, "Mrs. Adis". Kaye-Smith wrote on rural themes and was popular in the United States. Some critics thought the basic plot of "Sanctuary," and some of the descriptions and dialogue, were virtually identical to Kaye-Smith's work. According to George B. Hutchinson, the plagiary accusation was "probably valid."

The scholar H. Pearce disputed this assessment, writing that, compared to Kaye-Smith's tale, "Sanctuary" is "longer, better written and more explicitly political, specifically around issues of race—rather than class as in 'Mrs Adis'." Pearce thought that Larsen reworked and updated the tale into a modern American black context. Pearce also noted that in Kaye-Smith's 1956 book, All the Books of My Life, the author said she had based "Mrs Adis" on a 17th-century story by St Francis de Sales, Catholic bishop of Geneva. It is unknown whether she knew of the Larsen controversy in the United States. Larsen herself said the story came to her as "almost folk-lore", recounted to her by a patient when she was a nurse.

No plagiarism charges were proved. Larsen received a Guggenheim Fellowship even in the aftermath of the controversy, worth roughly $2,500 at the time, and was the first African-American woman to do so. She used it to travel to Europe for several years, spending time in Mallorca and Paris, where she worked on a novel about a love triangle in which all the protagonists were white. She never published the book or any other works.

== Later life ==
Larsen returned to New York in 1937, when her divorce had been completed. She was given a generous alimony in the divorce, which gave her the financial security she needed until Imes's death in 1941. Struggling with depression, Larsen stopped writing. After her ex-husband's death, Larsen returned to nursing and became an administrator. She disappeared from literary circles. She lived on the Lower East Side and did not venture to Harlem.

Many of her old acquaintances speculated that she, like some of the characters in her fiction, had crossed the color line to "pass" into the white community. George B. Hutchinson has demonstrated that she remained in New York, working as a nurse.

While some scholars have interpreted Larsen's return to nursing as an "act of self-burial" or a "retreat" motivated by a lack of courage, this perspective disregards the historical reality that stable, financially secure employment was difficult for a woman of color to find during that period. For Larsen, nursing was a "labor market that welcomed an African American as a domestic servant". Nursing had been something that came naturally to Larsen as it was "one respectable option for support during the process of learning about the work." During her work as a nurse, Larsen was noticed by Adah Thoms, an African-American nurse who co-founded the National Association of Colored Graduate Nurses. Thoms had seen potential in Larsen's nursing career and helped strengthen Larsen's skills. When Larsen graduated in 1915, it was Adah Thoms who had made arrangements for Larsen to work at Tuskegee Institute's hospital.

Larsen draws from her medical background in Passing to create the character of Brian, a doctor and husband of the main character. Larsen describes Brian as being ambivalent about his work in the medical field. Brian's character may also be partially modeled on Larsen's husband Elmer Imes, a physicist. After Imes divorced Larsen, he was closely associated with Ethel Gilbert, Fisk Director of public relations and manager of the Fisk Jubilee Singers, although it is unclear if the two married.

== Death ==
Larsen died in her Brooklyn apartment at 315 Second Avenue on or about March 30, 1964, at the age of 72.

Her friend, Alice Carper, believed the body had lain in the apartment for several days before being found, expressing frustration that Larsen’s colleagues at Metropolitan Hospital had not investigated her absence sooner.

When her apartment was entered, valuables—including jewelry, vases, and antiques—had disappeared, and her papers were found scattered across the floor. The funeral service was held on April 6, 1964 and was attended by more than forty people, nearly all of whom were nurses.

She was buried in Alice Carper’s family plot in the "Garden of Memory" at Cypress Hills Cemetery, located on the border of Brooklyn and Queens. Her husband had been buried in the same cemetery years earlier.

The New York Times published a brief death notice, which gave no indication of her literary success. It listed her as "Imes—Nella Larsen" and noted her profession as a Registered Nurse.

== Legacy ==
Larsen was added to The Norton Anthology of American Literature in the Sixth Edition in 2002, which included Quicksand (1928).

In 2018, The New York Times published a belated obituary for her. She was inducted into the Chicago Literary Hall of Fame in 2022.

Larsen has been compared to other authors who also wrote about cultural and racial conflict such as Claude Mckay and Jean Toomer.

Larsen's novel Passing was adapted as a 2021 film of the same name by Rebecca Hall.

== Works ==
=== Quicksand (1928) ===
Helga Crane is a fictional character loosely based on Larsen's experiences in her early life. Crane is the lovely and refined mixed-race daughter of a Danish white mother and a West Indian black father. Her father died soon after she was born. Unable to feel comfortable with her maternal European-American relatives, Crane lives in various places in the United States and visits Denmark, searching for people among whom she feels at home. As writer Amina Gautier points out, "In a mere 135 pages, Larsen details five different geographical spaces and each space Helga Crane moves to or through alludes to a different stage in her emotional and psychological growth."

Larsen's early life is similar to Helga's in that she was distant from the African-American community, including her African-American family members. Larsen and Helga did not have father figures. Both of their mothers decided to marry a white man with the hope of having a higher social status. Larsen wanted to learn more about her background so she continued to go to school during the Harlem Renaissance. Even though Larsen's early life parallels Helga's, in adulthood, their life choices end up being very different. Larsen pursued a career in nursing while Helga married a preacher and stayed in a very unhappy marriage.

In her travels, she encounters many of the communities that Larsen knew. For example, Crane teaches at Naxos, a Southern Negro boarding school (based on Tuskegee University), where she becomes dissatisfied with its philosophy. She criticizes a sermon by a white preacher, who advocates the segregation of blacks into separate schools and says their striving for social equality would lead blacks to become avaricious. Crane quits teaching and moves to Chicago. Her white maternal uncle, now married to a bigoted woman, shuns her. Crane moves to Harlem, New York, where she finds a refined but often hypocritical black middle class obsessed with the "race problem."

Taking her uncle's legacy, Crane visits her maternal aunt in Copenhagen. There she is treated as an attractive racial exotic. Missing black people, she returns to New York City. Close to a mental breakdown, Crane happens onto a store-front revival and has a charismatic religious experience. After marrying the preacher who converted her, she moves with him to the rural Deep South. There she is disillusioned by the people's adherence to religion. In each of her moves, Crane fails to find fulfillment. She is looking for more than how to integrate her mixed ancestry. She expresses complex feelings about what she and her friends consider genetic differences between races.

The novel develops Crane's search for a marriage partner. As it opens, she has become engaged to marry a prominent Southern Negro man, whom she does not really love, but with whom she can gain social benefits. In Denmark she turns down the proposal of a famous white Danish artist for similar reasons, for lack of feeling. By the final chapters, Crane has married a black Southern preacher. The novel's close is deeply pessimistic. Crane had hoped to find sexual fulfillment in marriage and some success in helping the poor Southern blacks she lives among, but instead she has frequent pregnancies and suffering. Disillusioned with religion, her husband, and her life, Crane fantasizes about leaving her husband, but never does. Instead, "[s]he sinks into a slough of disillusionment and indifference. She tries to fight her way back to her own world, but she is too weak, and circumstances are too strong."

Critics were impressed with the novel. They appreciated her more indirect take on important topics such as race, class, sexuality, and other issues important to the African-American community rather than the explicit or obvious take of other Harlem Renaissance writers. George B. Hutchinson argued that while most race literature of the time relied on specific tropes, usually involving a wealthy white father and a black mother, often rooted in Southern slave history, Larsen’s work was unique because it was rooted in her own "invisible" personal history: the child of a working-class white Danish immigrant and a black Caribbean father, with no ancestral ties to the American South:

The theme of 'mulatto' tragedy had a long history in American fiction, but Larsen’s book veered sharply away from the conventions of novels by both blacks and whites centering on mixed-race protagonists. This may have had less to do with a conscious decision to undermine the old models than with the fact that, as far as 'race' literature is concerned, the models available to Larsen bore no resemblance to her personal history.

— George B. Hutchinson, In Search of Nella Larsen

The New York Times reviewer found it "an articulate, sympathetic first novel" which demonstrated an understanding that "a novelist's business is primarily with individuals and not with classes." The novel also won Larsen a bronze prize (second place) for literature in 1928 from the William E. Harmon Foundation.

=== Passing (1929) ===
While Quicksand focuses on a woman who is neither white nor black, Larsen's second novel, Passing, is fundamentally about the disturbance generated by a woman who is both white and black. The character Clare Kendry is described as "literally, both a black white woman and a white black woman." The work examines the instability this causes in a society strictly governed by the color line.

Passing begins with Irene Redfield receiving a mysterious letter from Clare, her childhood friend, following their encounter at the Drayton Hotel, after twelve years with no communication. Irene and Clare lost contact with each other after the death of Clare's father, Bob Kendry, when Clare was sent to live with her white aunts. Both Irene and Clare are of mixed African-European ancestry, with features that enable them to pass racially as white if they choose. Clare chose to pass into white society and married John Bellew, a racist white man. Unlike Clare, Irene passes as white only on occasion for convenience, in order be served in a segregated restaurant, for example. Irene identifies as a black woman and married an African-American doctor named Brian; together they have two sons.

After Irene and Clare reconnect, they become fascinated with the differences in their lives. One day, Irene meets with Clare and Gertrude, another of their childhood African-American friends; during that meeting John Bellew meets Irene and Gertrude. Bellew greets his wife with a racist pet name, although he doesn't know that she is partially black.

Irene becomes furious that Clare did not tell her husband about her full ancestry. Irene believes Clare has put herself in a dangerous situation by lying to a person who hates blacks. After meeting Clare's husband, Irene does not want anything more to do with Clare but still keeps in touch with her. Clare begins to join Irene and Brian for their events in Harlem, New York while her husband is traveling out of town. Because Irene has some jealousy of Clare, she begins to suspect her friend is having an affair with her husband Brian.

The novel ends with John Bellew learning that Clare is of mixed race. At a party in Harlem, she falls out of a window from a high floor of a multi-story building, to her death, in ambiguous circumstances. Larsen ends the novel without revealing if Clare committed suicide, if Irene or her husband pushed her, or if it was an accident.

The novel was well received by the few critics who reviewed it. Writer and scholar W. E. B. Du Bois hailed it as "one of the finest novels of the year."

Later critics have framed the work as a sophisticated assault on the institution of race, using the "mystery" of passing to expose the fragility of the social and psychological structures that sustain the color line. Some have described the novel as an example of the genre of the tragic mulatto, a common figure in early African-American literature after the American Civil War. In such works, it is usually a woman of mixed race who is portrayed as tragic, as she has difficulty marrying and finding a place to fit into society. George B. Hutchinson has claimed that Larsen’s attention to these themes was a deliberate choice used to explore deeper psychological and social complexities:

Critics have often found fault with the novel’s ending, seeing Clare’s death as a melodramatic and unrealistic means by which Larsen extricated herself from a narrative corner into which she had painted herself. But the scene uses the techniques of expressionism...and is necessary for setting up the real focus of the novel’s ending, which is not Clare’s death but the drama of disavowal....Corresponding to complaints about the ending is the common charge that the novel is weakened by its very attention to passing and to a supposed tragic mulatto—hackneyed conventions allegedly dictated by the need (or pathetic desire) to appeal to a white audience....On the contrary, Larsen uses her titular subject matter to blast wide holes in established convention, and the mysterious murder of the white/black woman is absolutely essential to the novel.

— George B. Hutchinson, In Search of Nella Larsen

It has been suggested that the novel complicates its plot by playing with the duality of the figures of Irene and Clare, who are of similar mixed-race background, but have taken different paths in life. Hutchinson has pointed out that these figures are complex doubles. Larsen effectively divided her own emotional life and anxieties between them, with Irene representing her marriage anxieties, concern for "safety" and conventional social mores, and Clare representing the creative and destructive aspects of her personality. The reader never truly knows Clare because Larsen filters all perceptions through what Hutchinson has called Irene’s "clouded perspective." This narrative choice leaves Clare a mystery and forces the reader to confront Irene’s own psychological instability and obsession. Clare’s "peculiar adaptation to the racism of individuals on whom she relies" suggests that the novel is less about a longing for the race and more about the gallantry and risk involved in navigating a world that demands absolute racial categories.

The novel also suggests attraction between Irene and Clare and erotic undertones in the two women's relationship. Irene's husband is also portrayed as potentially bisexual, as if the characters are passing in their sexual as well as social identities. Some read the novel as one of repression. Others argue that through its attention to the way "passing" unhinges ideas of race, class, and gender, the novel opens spaces for the creation of new, self-generated identities.

Since the late 20th century, Passing has received renewed attention from scholars because of its close examination of racial and sexual ambiguities and liminal spaces. It has achieved canonical status in many American universities, and Passing replaced Quicksand in the ninth edition (2017) of The Norton Anthology of American Literature.

== Bibliography ==
=== Books ===
- Quicksand (1928)
- Passing (1929)

=== Short stories ===
- "Freedom" (1926)
- "The Wrong Man" (1926)
- "Playtime: Three Scandinavian Games", The Brownies' Book, 1 (June 1920): 191–192.
- "Playtime: Danish Fun", The Brownies' Book, 1 (July 1920): 219.
- "Sanctuary", Forum, 83 (January 1930): 15–18.

=== Non-fiction ===
- "Correspondence", Opportunity, 4 (September 1926): 295.
- "Review of Black Spade," Opportunity, 7 (January 1929): 24.
- "The Author's Explanation", Forum, Supplement 4, 83 (April 1930): 41–42.
