= Quicksand (Larsen novel) =

1928 novel by Nella Larsen

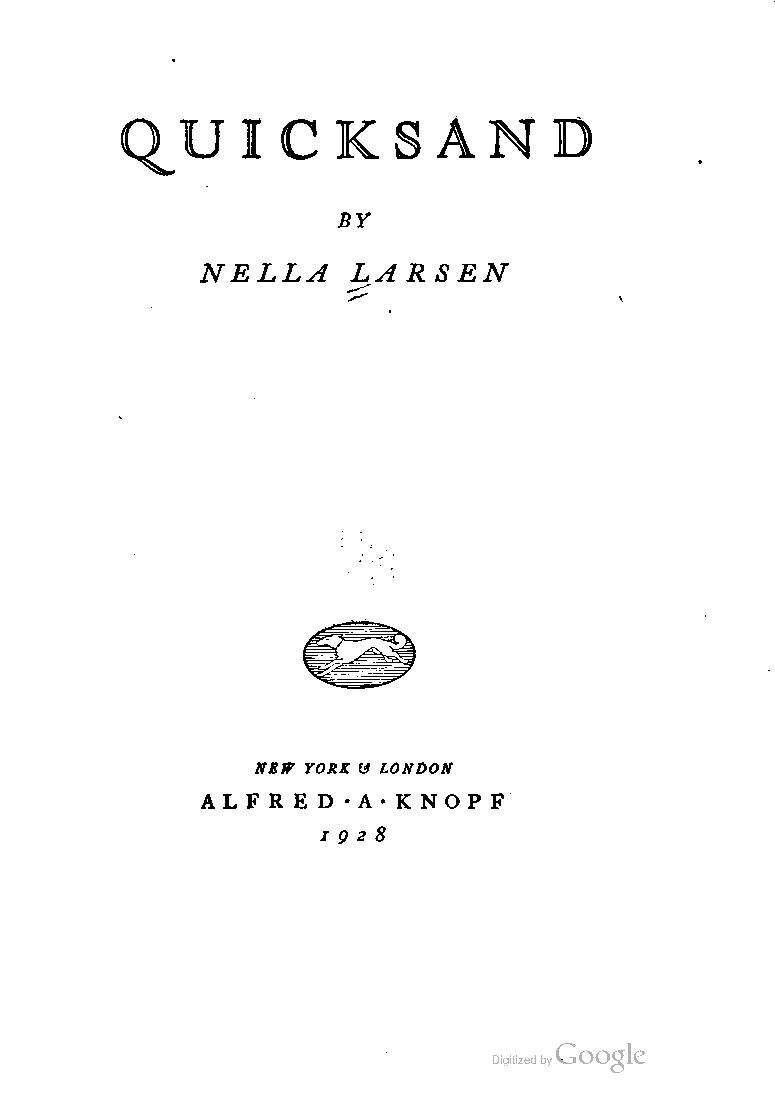
Quicksand title page

Quicksand is the first novel by American author Nella Larsen, first published in 1928. Out of print from the 1930s to the 1970s, Quicksand is a work that explores both cross-cultural and interracial themes. Larsen dedicated the novel to her husband.

Jacquelyn Y. McLendon called this work the more "obviously autobiographical" of Larsen's two novels. Larsen called the emotional experiences of the novel "the awful truth" in a letter to her friend Carl van Vechten.

== Plot ==
The protagonist is the well-educated, mixed-race Helga Crane, who struggles to find her identity in a world of racialized crisis in the 1920s. Helga is the daughter of a Danish mother, who died when she was an adolescent, and a West Indian father, who is absent. Her early years were spent with her Danish mother and White step-father who loathed her, and there began her torn relationship with her split identity. The novel gives us a glimpse into the dichotomy of biracial identity and the divergence into two vastly different worlds as the protagonist travels through uniquely different cultural spaces ranging from Jazz Age Harlem to Copenhagen, Denmark.

The novel begins with Helga teaching at a southern black school in Naxos (thought by critics to reflect Larsen's experiences of the Tuskegee Institute and Fisk University). The principal is Dr Anderson, with whom Helga—as she later realises—falls in love. While teaching in Naxos, Helga suffers from angst, repelled by the institution's tendency to whitewash her black colleagues. A key development in the plot is her discontent at the social uplift philosophy espoused by a white preacher, a Booker T. Washington-inspired sermon that reinforces racial segregation and warns black students that striving for social equality will lead them to become avaricious. Helga's anger at the sermon incites her first attempt to escape oppression: she quits her job and moves home to Chicago.

In Chicago, Helga's white maternal uncle and former sponsor, now married to a bigoted woman, shuns her. Unemployed and in desperation, Helga is saved by a few days working as secretary to the black, wealthy but brash Mrs. Hayes-Rore, who is a prominent activist concerning the "race problem". Hayes-Rore enables Helga to move to Harlem and become a secretary there.

Helga is initially enthusiastic about Harlem life, but becomes dissatisfied, partly because she feels excluded by the polarisation of black and white politics: she experiences complex feelings about what she and her friends consider inherent differences between races. She is courted by Dr Anderson, who has, she discovers, also fled Naxos's toxic ideologies, but does not accept his overtures. An unexpected inheritance from her uncle enables Helga to make her third flight, this time moving to the home of her well-to-do maternal aunt Katrina in Copenhagen.

Although she enjoys the life of leisure she enters in Denmark and an escape from the structural racism of America, she is exoticised and sexualised, not least by a prominent painter, Axel Olsen, whose offer of marriage Helga refuses. Again dissatisfied, Helga returns to New York City.

In New York, Dr Anderson marries Helga's best friend Anne. Later, Dr Anderson sexually assaults Helga. Helga hopes that a love affair will follow, but Dr Anderson dashes her hopes. Close to a mental breakdown, Crane happens upon a store-front revival and has a charismatic religious experience. She implicitly has sex with a preacher whom she meets there, marries him, and moves with him to rural Alabama, in the Deep South.

Initially embracing the role of pastor's wife, Helga swiftly has four children. Fully indulging in an intimate relationship with a man for the first time, Helga is forced to exist in one space and becomes stuck, becoming disillusioned with religion once more. The fourth birth breaks her health and her spirit. The novel ends with Helga's fifth birth about to take place.

== Historical context ==
Larsen wrote Quicksand during an intense American cultural nationalism, where the nation shared one culture. During this period, books and essays devoted to this large period of cultural nationalism and interpretations of African American modernism were released. The majority of the novel took place in Harlem. The story was written and published in 1928, meaning that the 1920s were almost over by the time Nella Larsen had published this fictional autobiography. Many major events took place during the 1920s. On Wall Street in 1920, a terrorist attack killed nearly 40 civilians and injured hundreds. With more gruesome things happening, the KKK (Ku Klux Klan) sowed fear in the whole nation.

During the 1920s, the "Lost Generation" began its transformation of American literature. The term was "coined from something Gertrude Stein witnessed the owner of a garage saying to his young employee, which Hemingway later used as an epigraph to his novel The Sun Also Rises (1926): "You are all a lost generation." This accusation referred to the lack of purpose or drive resulting from the horrific disillusionment felt by those who grew up and lived through the war, and were then in their twenties and thirties." The first-ever licensed radio station was created during the 1920s, and allowed for people to listen in real-time about news, sports, or whatever else. By 1926, there were over 700 radio stations nationwide. The creation of radio stations sparked the formation of mass media. From 1910 to the 1930s, Harlem was in the "golden period" or the "Roaring 20's" and was shaping the path for many African Americans to display their art of music, dance, literature, and much more. Many famous artists still known today were born in the Harlem Renaissance – for example, writer Langston Hughes, poet Countee Cullen, jazz musician Louis Armstrong, Josephine Baker and her musicals, and painter Aaron Douglas. Many more artists came forward as time went on.

== Characters ==
- Helga Crane – The story's protagonist. Helga's mother was born in Denmark and her father was of west-Indian descent. Helga is a young, biracial woman whose journey's purpose is finding a place where she belongs. She struggles with insecurities.
- Mrs. Hayes-Rore – Helga's employer that enables Helga to move to Harlem after she leaves Naxos. The protagonist is hired to help Mrs. Hayes-Rore write a speech.
- Dr. Robert Anderson – The principal of Naxos who becomes someone that Helga thinks of romantically.
- Anne Grey – Helga's friend that introduces her to the Harlem Culture. She is a socialite and widow who is utterly obsessed with the race problem brought up in the novel.
- Reverend Mr. Pleasant Green – A southern reverend Helga meets during her return to New York after bumping into him at church. The two then get married and move to Alabama, where they have five children.
- Herr Axel Olsen – Danish artist that proposes to Helga and ultimately gets turned down because he objectifies her.
- Fru Dahl (Aunt Katrina) – Helga's white aunt in Copenhagen, her mother's sister.
- Herr Dahl (Uncle Poul) – Helga's white uncle that lives in Copenhagen.

== Themes ==
=== Race, segregation, and society ===
Helga's struggles with race are emphasized due to society's attitude toward her. Helga's mental and physical expedition is to find a place where she doesn't draw attention to, or take away from, her differences. However, society and social order play a role in which people are viewed if they are culturally different. Helga's racial identity has been constructed by others' inability to accept her own differences.

=== Mixed race identity ===
Helga is a young biracial (half white, half black) woman. For Helga, identifying as a biracial woman means she has different restrictions when it comes to racial labels. Her struggles with her identity come from how other people view themselves and others. Helga's understanding of herself is constructed through cultural artifacts created by others. Helga follows a biracial identity by refusing to follow a strict racial lifestyle but she still acknowledges her black culture.

=== Race and gender ===
Helga's future is determined by her sex and her race. Her fascination with clothing and color is a way for Helga to build a female identity for herself. Helga dressed in styles unique to herself and others as a way to stand out from the rest. The way she dressed also goes against the way Naxos wanted their teachers to look. She was meant to stand out.
