= Biographical fallacy =

Art term

The biographical fallacy is a term used in cultural criticism to critique the view that works of creative art, literature or music always can be or should be interpreted as reflections of the life of their authors. Along with the intentional fallacy, the term was introduced by exponents of the New Criticism who wished to emphasise that artworks should be interpreted and assessed as constructed artifacts rather than expressions of the emotions of specific individuals. The term is thus used to criticize the school of literary interpretation called biographical criticism.

The argument arose from the increasing tendency of critics during the 19th century to view artworks in terms of the life experiences of their creators, whether their personal lives, or the wider historical conditions represented in the artist's world view, a claim associated with critics such as Hippolyte Taine.

This position was referred to as a "fallacy" on the grounds that it neglected both the purely imaginative aspects of the arts and their reliance on formal conventions and rules of genre. Thus James M. Thomas writes of the fallacy applied to drama that,

This type of approach distances itself from the play and goes instead into the playwright's biography to find people, places and things that seem to be similar to features in the play. And then it claims that the play is actually a picture of these people, places and things. In its extreme form this is a fallacy because it does not consider that playwrights use their imagination when they write and that they can imagine improbable or even impossible things.

Robert S. Miola, Professor of English at Loyola College in Maryland, discusses the biographical fallacy as "the unqualified conviction that one can read the author's life from the work and vice versa", and adds:

This fallacy is widespread in Shakespeare studies, true enough, but the business of wrenching passages out of dramatic context as evidence of the playwright's personal beliefs usually reveals more about the critic than about Shakespeare.

Commenting further on the fallacy as applied to contemporary work about Shakespeare, Joseph Pearce asserts that "For the proponents of ‘queer theory' he becomes conveniently homosexual; for secular fundamentalists he is a proto-secularist, ahead of his time; for ‘post-Christian' agnostics he becomes a prophet of modernity.”

Others consider the term offensive and defend biographical criticism in its non-extreme forms, finding that full understanding of an author's works is not possible without extrinsic sources. Leon Edel in his book Literary Biography devoted a chapter to defending biographical criticism. While admitting the excesses of certain earlier critics‘ use of biography, he rigorously stated that "no critic, I hold, can explicate—the very word implies this—anything without alluding to something else [outside the work]."

The term inverted autobiography is also applied to the practice.
