= Moulder (surname) =

Moulder is an English-language surname. Notable people with the surname include:

- Alan Moulder (born 1959), British record producer
- Edwin Moulder (1873–1942), Guyanese cricketer
- Glen Moulder (1917–1994), U.S. baseball player
- Helen Moulder (born 1947), New Zealand actress
- Henry Moulder (1883–1967), Australian politician
- James W. Moulder (1921–2011), American microbiologist
- John Moulder (1881–1933), British cricketer
- Kevin Moulder (born 1980), U.S. basketball coach
- Morgan M. Moulder (1904–1976), U.S. politician
- Robin Moulder (born 1966), U.S. musician
- Thomas Moulder (1872–1920), Guyanese cricketer
- John Moulder-Brown (born 1953), British actor
- John Moulder Wilson (1837–1919), U.S. soldier

== See also ==
- Maulder, the botanical author abbreviation for Ricky G. Maulder
- Peter Maulder, a New Zealand athlete at the 1998 Oceania Junior Athletics Championships
- Muldaur (surname)
- Mulder (surname)
- Molder (disambiguation)
