= Orinx =

The family Orinx (also written as Orins, Oriens, Oreins, Orens, Orenge even Orange) are an age-old family of millers in Pajottenland and neighbouring regions Hainaut, East Flanders and Walloon Brabant in Belgium. A family member played a prominent part in the creation of the Belgian Draught horse at the end of the 19th century.

== Etymology ==
According to Jozef Van Overstraeten (1896–1986), honorary President of Vlaamse Toeristenbond – Vlaamse Automobilistenbond, the most probable explanation is the medieval Dutch word "oorrinc", meaning ear ring. A nickname for someone either wearing or making earrings. Less probable is the explanation as medieval Dutch "horic" meaning "hoek", corner, which is a remote dwelling in a village. Family names Hoorickx and Van Hoorick occur as well.

Frans Debrabandere, secretary-general of the Royal Commission for Toponymy and Dialectology, is an advocate of the latter explanation as "hoek".

== Spelling ==
The name Orinx is written in a variety of ways, due to:

- the prevailing illiteracy: few people could read and even fewer write. Compulsory education was only introduced in Belgium in 1914,
- the use of dialects,
- the use of French in French-speaking regions: a different pronunciation may lead to Orinx being pronounced and spelled Orins, Oreins.

== Distribution according to the spelling of the name ==
The national Belgian register of 2008 features different spellings.

Spelling	Total	Largest number/township (city)	Second largest number
Orinx	75	Asse	Brussels
Orins	36	Maarkedal	Kluisbergen
Oreins	35	Dour	Wavre
Oriens	1	Brussels	–
Orincx	1	Asse	–
Horrix	40	Maasmechelen	–
Horinckx	21	Brussels	Assenede
Horicx	14	Opwijk	Merchtem
Horicks	6	Brussels	Wavre
Hoorickx	21	Brussels	Assenede

The people named Orinx in Brussels mostly came over from Pajottenland.

== Related millers ==
The following families are related to the Orinx-Orins families:

Name	Mill	Township	relationship	with	year
J.F. Wyvekens	Mills of Arenberg (water)	Rebecq-Rognon (Rebecq)	son/grandson	A.M.Orins/Arnold Orins	1692–1773

== Auguste Oreins (Orenge) and the origin of the Belgian draft horse ==
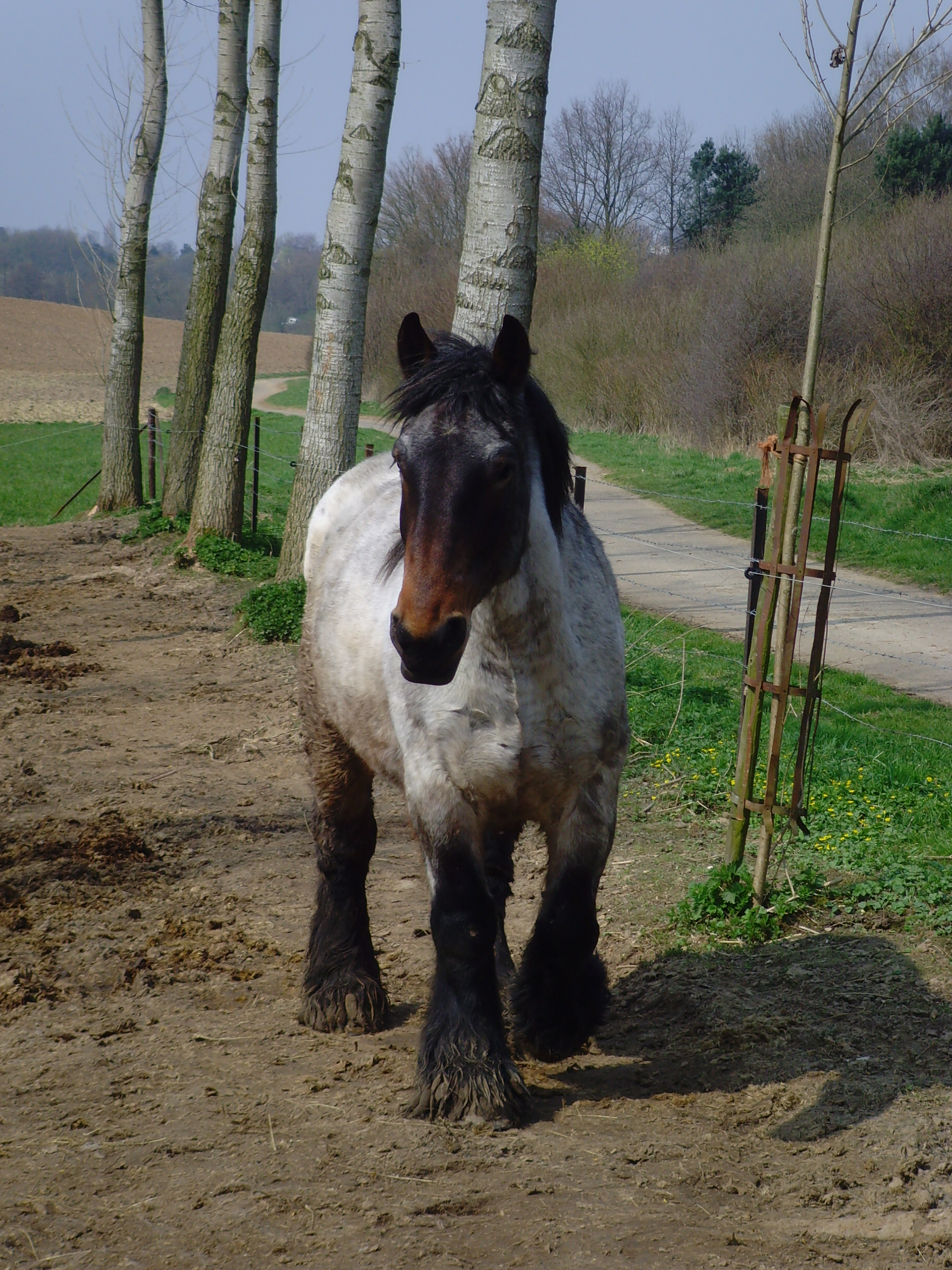
Belgian draft horse in the Pajottenland

Jean Orens (Orins) (c. 1620 – 1698) was both miller and alderman in Hove. His son Paul Antoine Orens (c. 1650–1735) went to live as a farmer in Montignies-lez-Lens, the first inhabitant with that name. His children were registered there under the names Oreins and Orenge. In 1823 the birth of Auguste Oreins meant the fourth generation.

In 1864, this Auguste bought a 30 month old stallion named Prins (Prince) in Grimminge. Auguste undertook week-long trips from village to village to have mares covered by Prins. Farmers had the owner and horse stay as long as possible, to make sure their mares were serviced at the precise moment. In the end, they nicknamed the stallion Gugusse, after his owner Auguste. When Gugusse turned ten, the governing board approved the stallion for the last year, since the horse had become lame. Gugusse was sold and in 1878 ended up with Jules Hazard, tenant of the Fosteau Castle manor farm. With 500 hectares to work, Jules Hazard needed many horses and he wanted a stud farm of his own as well. He had Gugusse registered in the stud book as Orange I (B.S. 1144), most probably as a reference to Auguste Oreins. All Belgian Draught horses are descendants of this Orange I. His best known sons were Brillant and Jupiter. Orange I died in 1885, aged 21.

Brillant, born in 1868, was bought by Remy Vanderschueren from Vollezele when he was nine. The success of the Brabant/Belgian draft horse started with this stallion. The horse won the highest international prizes from 1878 till 1884. At the Paris Exposition Universelle (1878) he became international champion, surpassing the best English, French and Italian breeds. The French press wrote: "An extraordinary stallion, Brillant was awarded the first prize as the most beautiful and strongest of all draft horses." More distinctions were to follow: London (1879), Lille (1879), Brussels (1881), Hannover (1881), and Amsterdam (1884).

Brillant, Belgian champion in 1890 as well, made Vollezele, a village in Pajottenland west of Brussels, a household name. Many important farmers in Vollezele and neighbouring villages followed suit, which made stud farming an important source of income with the Vollezele region as its centre. The Belgian draft horse became one of the main Belgian exports. In 1910, 34,599 draft horses were exported to Canada, Germany, France, Italy, The Netherlands, Russia, the United States and Sweden, at the price of 50 million Belgian francs. Enormous amounts were paid for stud horses. In 1930, Espoir de Quaregnon (Belgian champion in 1929) was exported to Italy for 1 million francs, equaling 505,000 euros. Stud fees were not cheap either, with 10,000 franks for Avenir d'Herse, the Belgian 1925 champion.

Since no top mares were available, Brillant could not fully pass on his qualities. Jupiter became Belgian champion in 1889 and was a successful stud horse. His son Rêve d'Or became world champion overall in 1900, winning three gold medals. Another son of Jupiter was Brin d'Or, who sired 140 descendants, among them Indigène du Fosteau who was Belgian champion in 1906, '07, '08 and '09. A number of Indigène's descendants were exported to The Netherlands. In 1924, 15,5% of registered Dutch horses descended from this stallion, and thus from Orange I

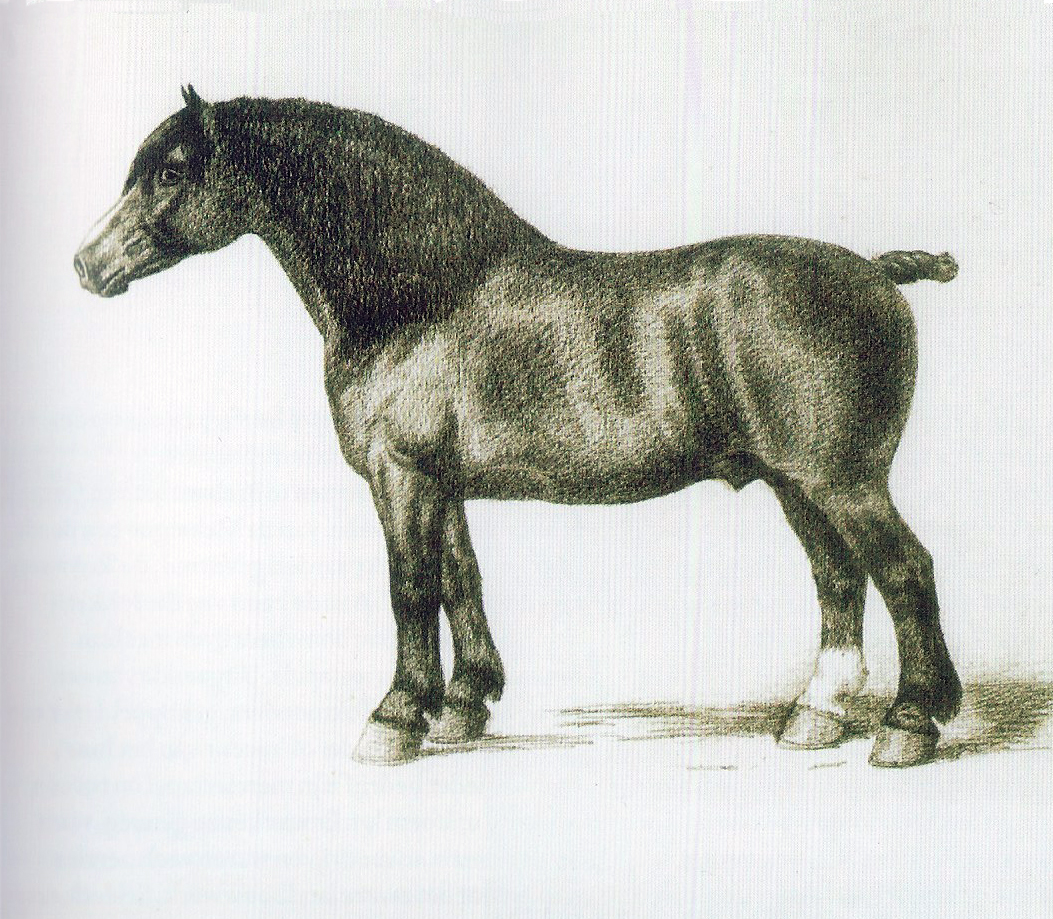
Gugusse-Orange I

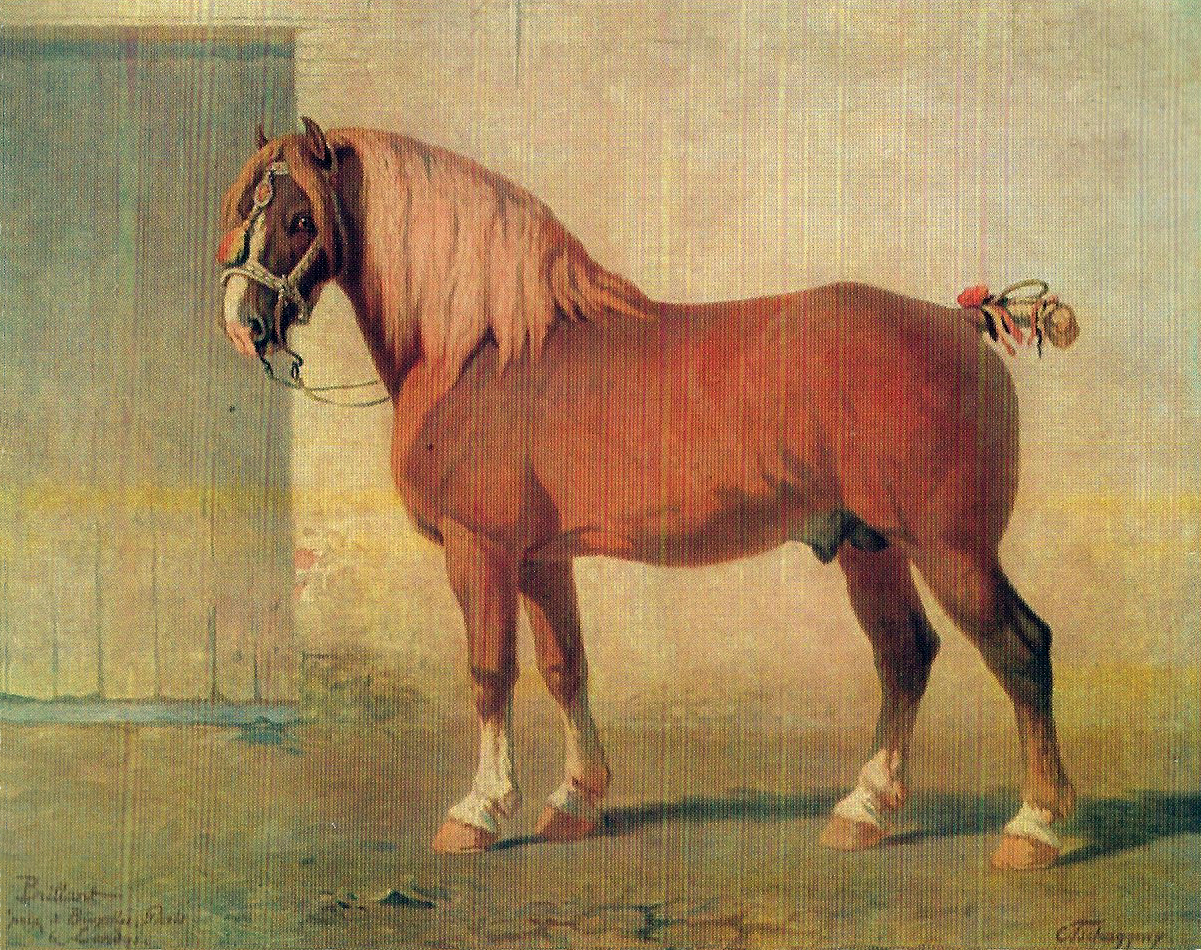
Brillant

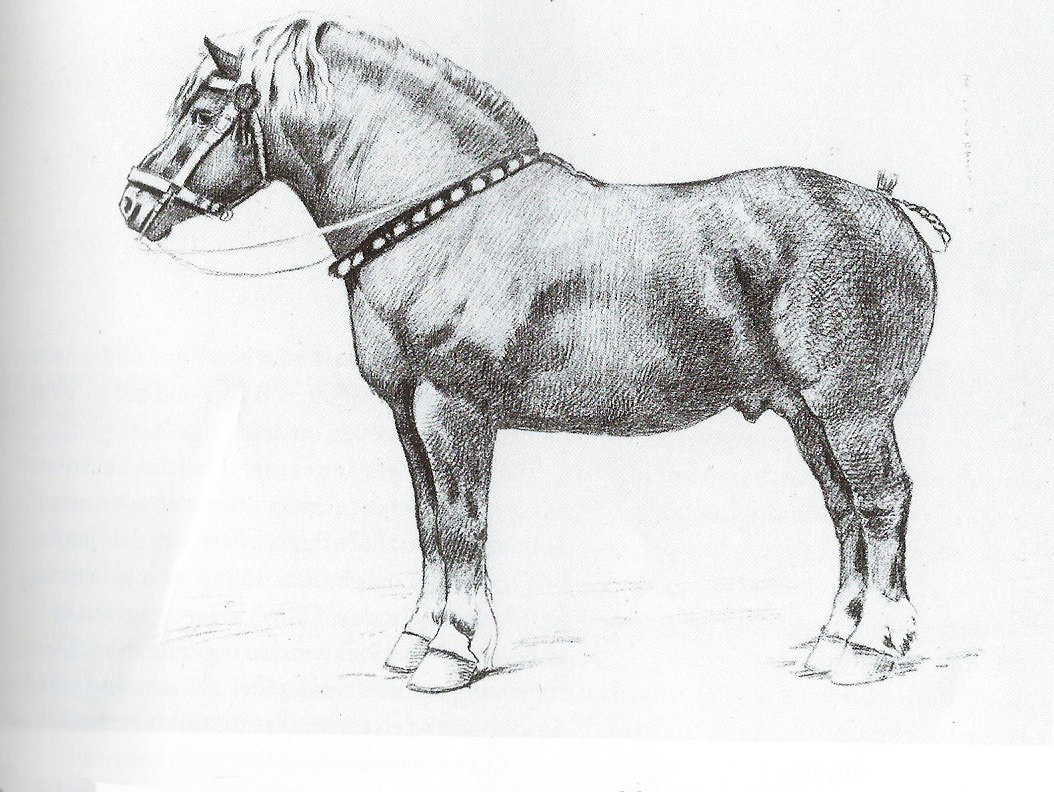
Rêve d'Or

Since 1887, a Wabash County, Indiana corporation has kept a register named The Belgian Draft Horse Corporation of America. The number of Belgian draft horses is higher than other breeds overall. The American Brabant Organisation was founded in Isanti, Minnesota in 1999, to protect, safeguard and promote the Brabant draft horse in the US.
In the United States and Canada, Belgian draft horses are still used by the Amish.

=== Descendants of Orange I who became Belgian champions ===
1889–Jupiter
1890–Brillant
1894–Mont d'Or
1895–Mont d'Or

1898–Rêve d'Or
1900–Brin d'Or
1905–Gambrinus du Fosteau
1906–Indigène du Fosteau

1907–Indigène du Fosteau
1908–Indigène du Fosteau
1909–Indigène du Fosteau
1914–Indigène de Wisbecq

=== Homage to Orange I and his descendants ===
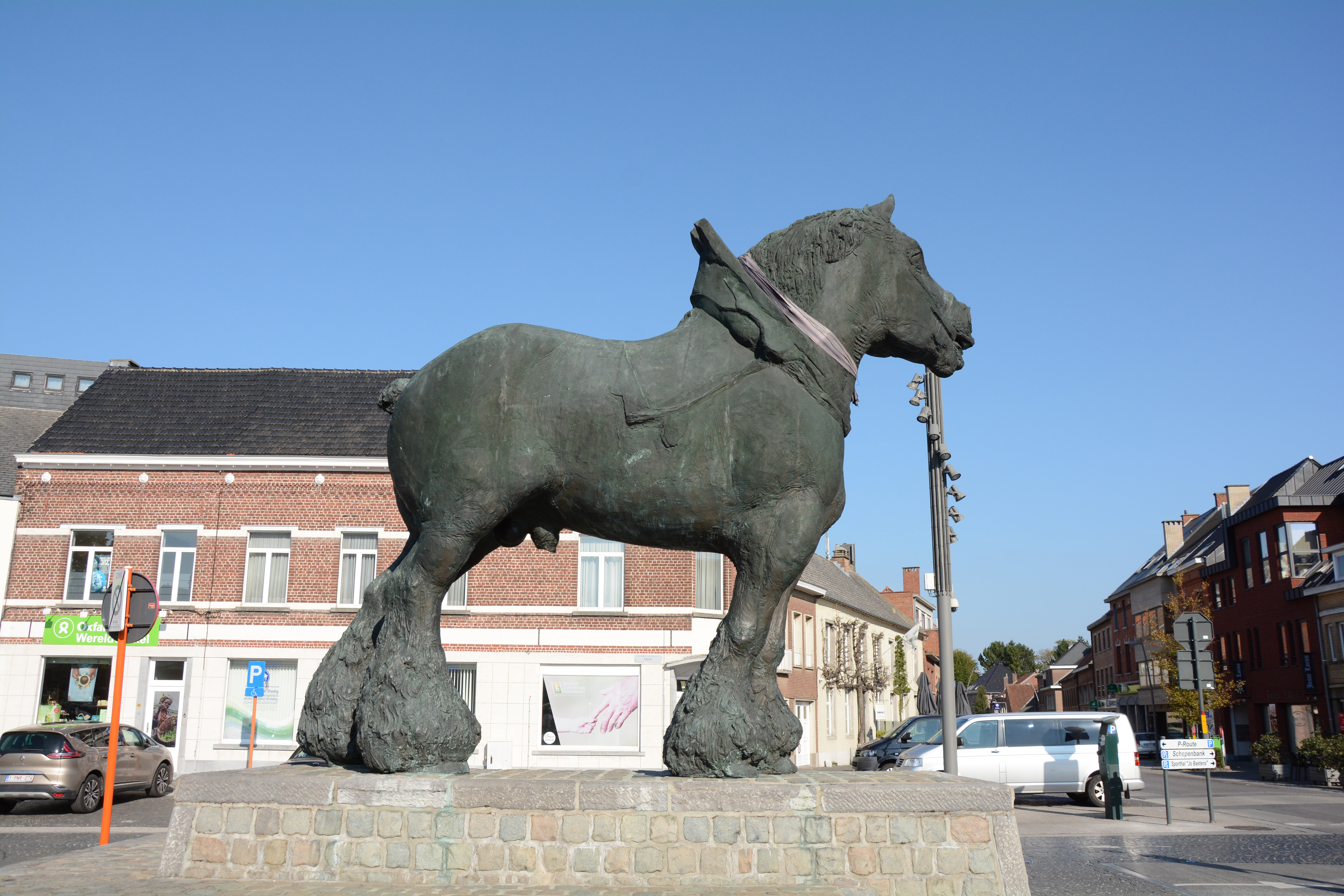
Prince, Pride of Brabant by Koenraad Tinel

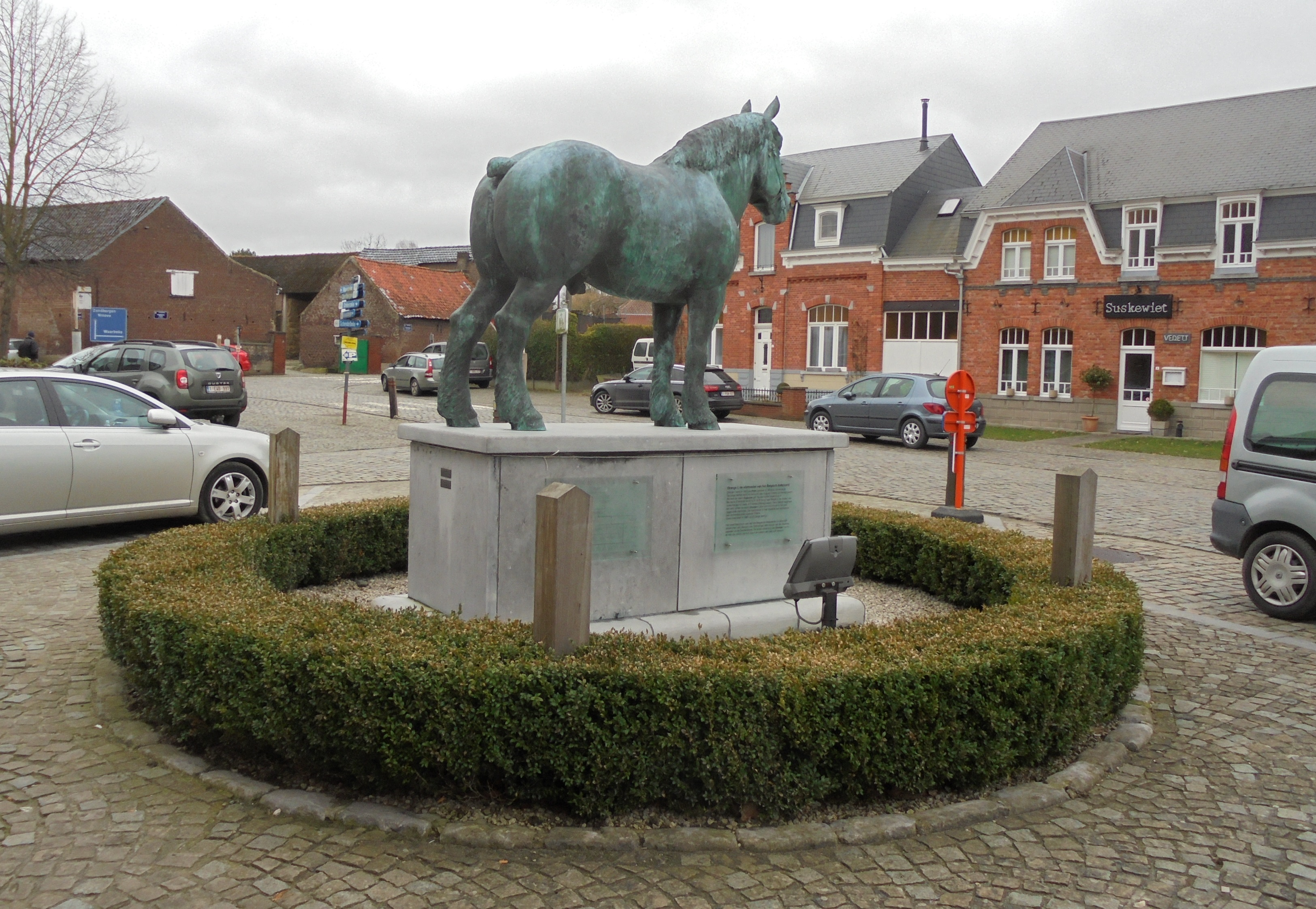
Orange I by Ron Deblaere

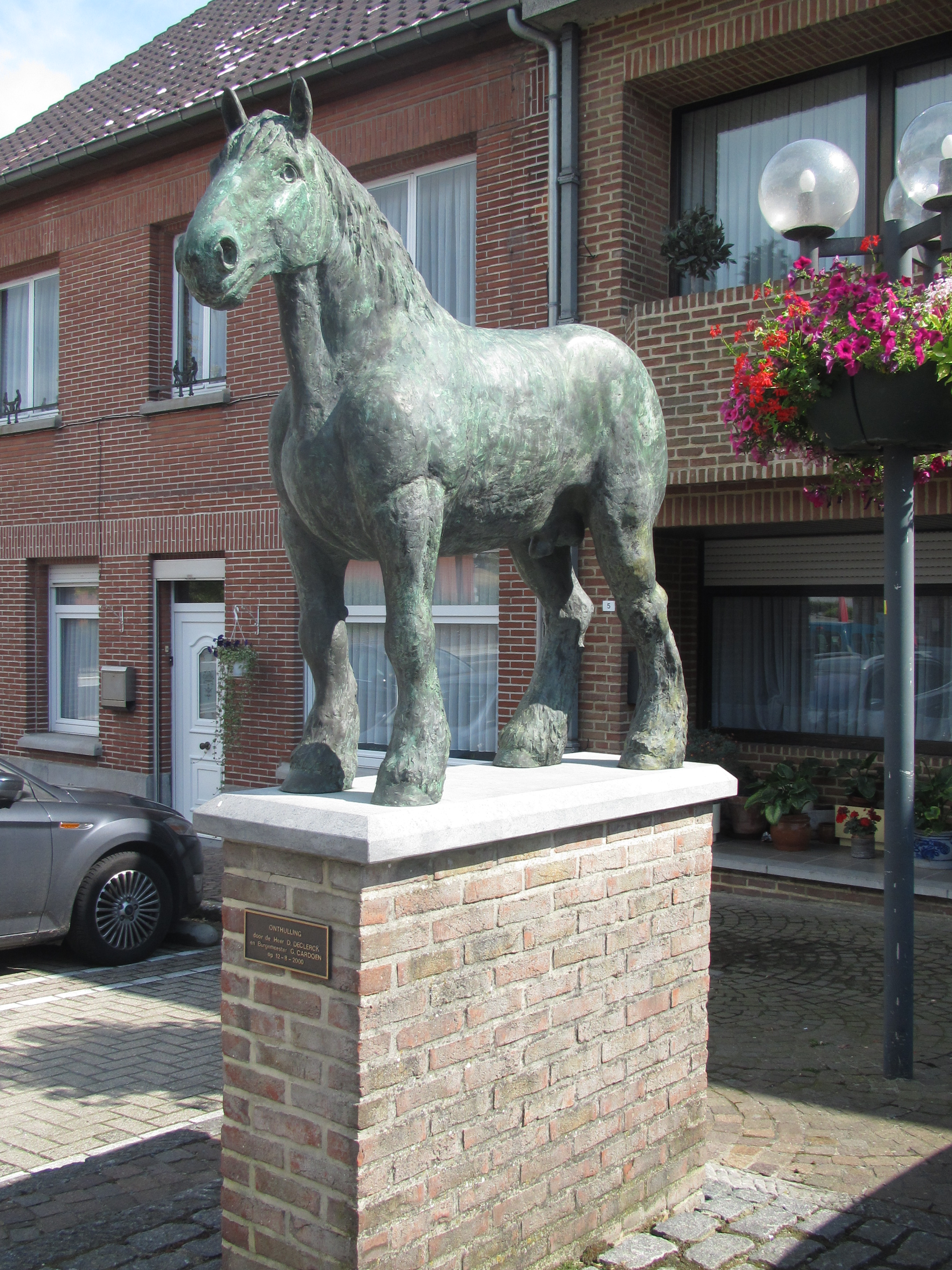
Brillant by Ron Deblaere

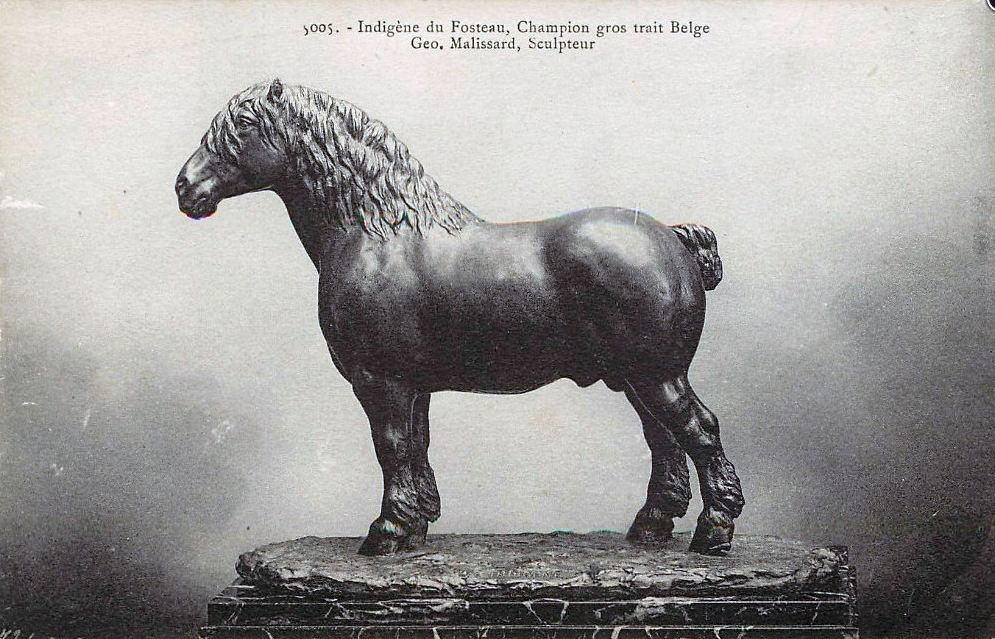
Indigène du Fosteau by Georges Malissard

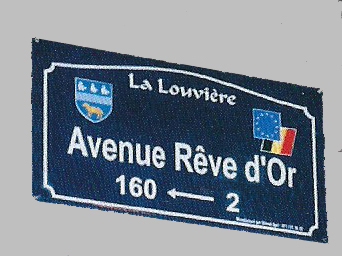
Rêve d'Or was a stallion worldchampion 1900

Sint-Kwintens-Lennik has a 4-metre-high bronze statue of Prins (Orange I) by sculptor Koenraad Tinel, as does Grimmige. Vollezele has a Brillant statue. In La Louvière, an avenue was named after Rêve d'Or. The tradition of the Brabant/Belgian draft horse has been listed as immaterial cultural Flemish heritage since 2018.

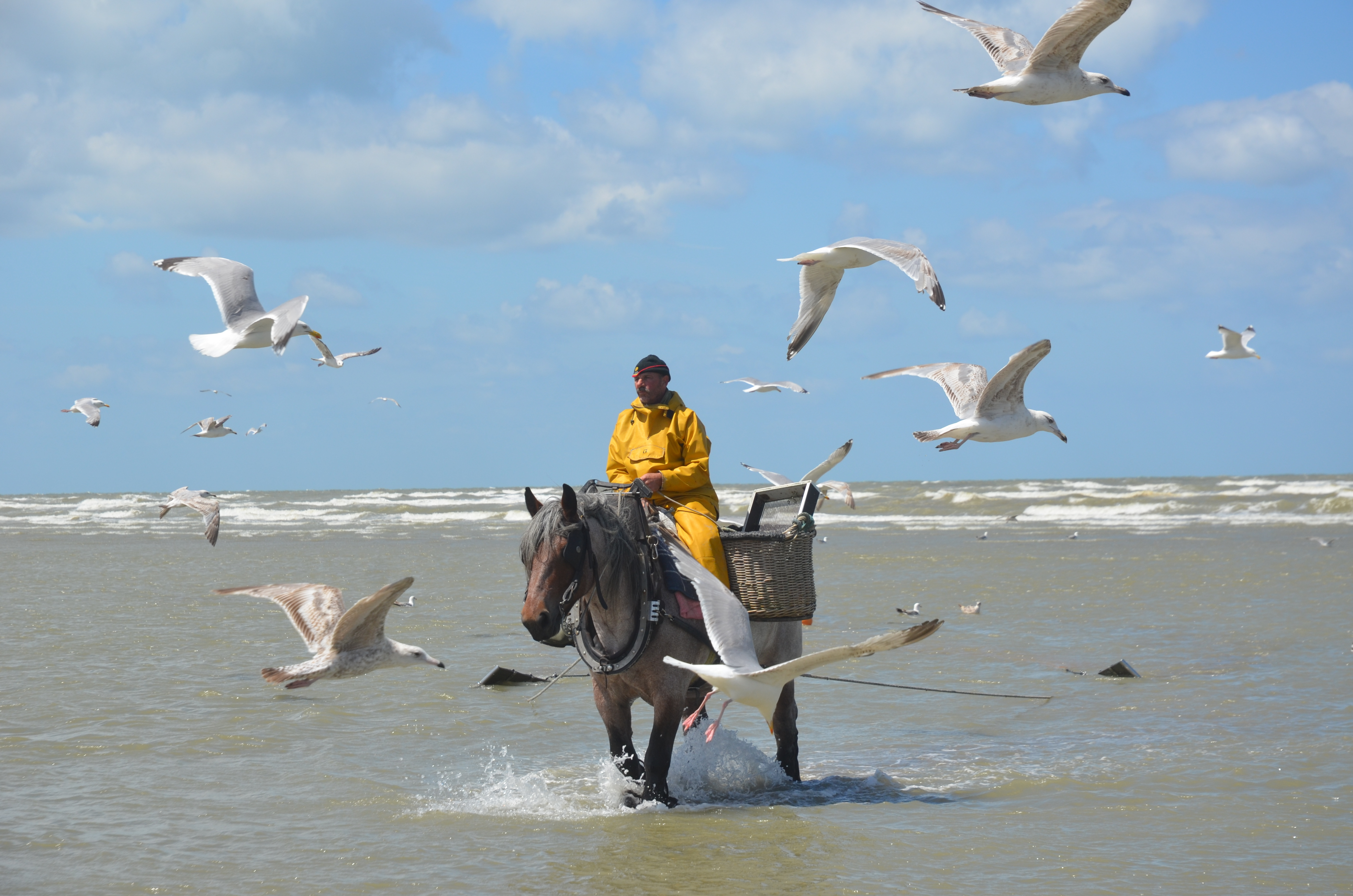
Horseback shrimp fishers in Oostduinkerke

The shrimp fishing on horseback in Oostduinkerke is recognized as Unesco World Intangible Cultural Heritage since 2013.

== Sources ==
- The State Archives in Belgium, search persons. Retrieved November 10, 2019.
- Forebears: Search millions of names & place. Retrieved (check) November 10, 2019
- Geneanet: Search your ancestors. Retrieved November 10, 2019
- Bestaande Belgische molens (Existing mills in Belgium). Retrieved November 10, 2019. (in Dutch)
- Verdwenen Belgische molens (Disappeared mills in Belgium. Retrieved November 10, 2019. (in Dutch)
- Erfgoedobject watermolen van Asbeek (Flanders Heritage Water mill Asse). Retrieved August 10, 2019. (in Dutch)
- The millers Orinx. Retrieved August 12, 2019.
- Peremans J., Orins (family), H.O.L.V.E.O, XX, p. 268–269. Retrieved August 10, 2019. (in Dutch)
- Peremans J., Orins (family), H.O.L.V.E.O., XXVIII, p. 137–142. Retrieved August 11, 2019. (in Dutch)
- Boomstra O.W., De waardij van een vroege opleiding, Editions Verloren Hilversum, 1993, p. 264. (The value of an early education) (in Dutch)
- Grimani Breviary: a Remarkable Artistic Collaboration between Simon Bening and Other Artists (c. 1515 – 1520)
- P. De Brauwer, Het Belgisch Trekpaard: Een levend monument, Lannoo, (2004). ISBN 978-90-209-5829-4 (in Dutch)
- P. C. Labouchère, De geschiedenis van het Belgische trekpaard en de invloed van Indigène du Fosteau op de Nederlandsche trekpaardfokkerij, Leiter-Nypels, 1927. (in Dutch)
- Fr. Lynghaug, The Official Horse Breeds Standards Guide: The Complete Guide to the Standards of All North American Equine Breed Associations, Voyageur Press, 2009. (pp. 346–355)
- Hynderick de Theulegoet, Monographie Du Cheval de Trait Belge, 1911, (Classic Reprint), Forgotten Books, 2018, 188s, ISBN 978-02-822481-6-1 (in French)
- History of the Belgian draught horse
- Belgian Draft Horse Corporation of America
- The American Brabant Association
- The Belgian Draught-horse Museum
- The Forefathers of the Belgian draft horse (in Dutch)
- A brief history about the Belgian Draft
- National champions of Belgium
- Horse Canada- Brabant Horse
- Haylee, Finn & Fergus, Hannah

== References and footnotes ==
This article is a translation of the corresponding article in the Dutch Wikipedia,
