= Mölders =

Mölders is a German name. It may refer to:

- Carmen Nicole Moelders or Nicole Mölders, American atmospheric scientist
- Sascha Mölders (born 1985), German footballer, played for 1860 München
- Werner Mölders (1913–1941), German flying ace
  - Jagdgeschwader 51, called “JG 51 Mölders” from 1942 on, was a Luftwaffe fighter wing during World War II
  - Jagdgeschwader 74, called “JG 74 Mölders” between 1973 and 2005, is an aviation unit of the German Luftwaffe, based on Neuburg air base in Bavaria
  - German destroyer Mölders (D186), a guided missile destroyer of the German Navy, in service 1969–2003
- Mölders (Emma), a fictional family in the historical romance manga “Emma” by Kaoru Mori

== See also ==
- Mölder, a surname
- Molder (disambiguation)
