= Molenaar =

Molenaar is a Dutch surname deriving from the Dutch word for "miller".

Notable people with the surname include:

- Beau Molenaar (born 1985), Dutch football goalkeeper
- Cees Molenaar (1928–1979), founder of the football club AZ
- Dee Molenaar (1918–2020), American mountaineer, author and artist
- Frans Molenaar (1940–2015), Dutch fashion designer
- Hillie Molenaar (born 1945), Dutch documentary film director
- Ivo Molenaar (1935–2018), Dutch statistician and psychometrician
- Jan Molenaar (1958–2009), perpetrator of the Napier shootings in New Zealand
- Keith R. Molenaar, American civil engineer
- Keje Molenaar (born 1958), Dutch footballer
- Klaas Molenaar (1921–1996), founder of the football club AZ
- Marjolijn Molenaar (born 1983), Dutch cricketer
- Peter Molenaar (born 1946), Dutch psychologist
- Robert Molenaar (born 1969), Dutch footballer
- Tim Molenaar (born 1981), New Zealand rugby player
- Willem Molenaar (1945–2022), Dutch cricket umpire

Notable people with the surname Moolenaar include:

- Bram Moolenaar (1961–2023), Dutch computer programmer
- John Moolenaar (born 1961), American politician from Michigan

== See also ==
- Mulder
- Smulders
