= Miller =

Person who produces flour or other products by operating a mill

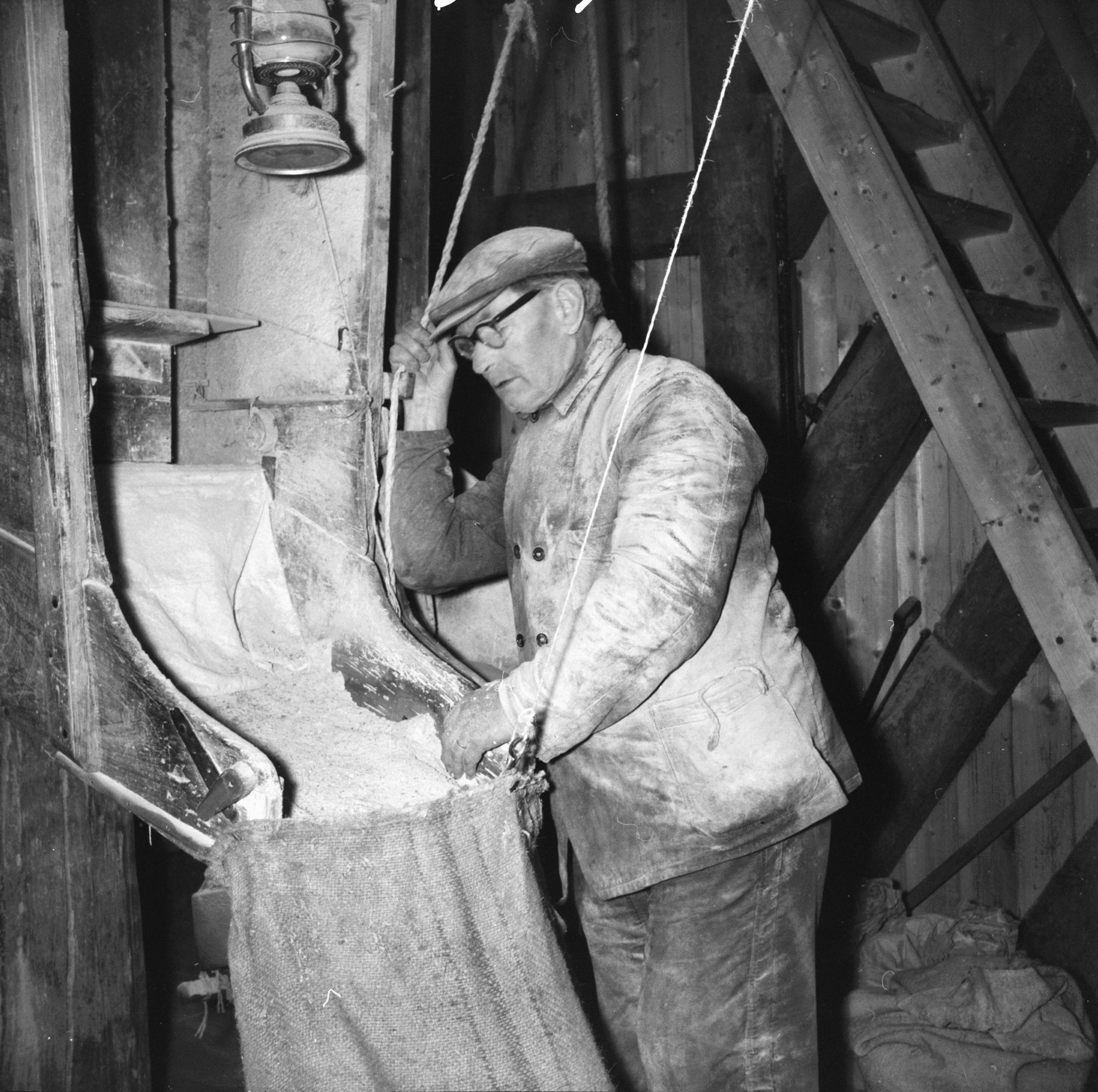
- Miller at work in the De Hoed, Waarde windmill, in the Netherlands

Occupation
- Occupation type: vocation
- Activity sectors: Agriculture

Description
- Competencies: Buying & Selling, Math, Machine repair,

A miller is a person who operates a mill, a machine to grind a grain (for example corn or wheat) to make flour. Milling is one of the oldest of human occupations. "Miller", "Milne" and other variants are common surnames, as are their equivalents in other languages around the world ("Melnyk" in Russian, Belarusian & Ukrainian, "Meunier" in French, "Müller" or "Mueller" in German, "Mulder" and "Molenaar" in Dutch, "Molnár" in Hungarian, "Molinero" and "Molina" in Spanish, "Molinaro" or "Molinari" in Italian, "Mlinar" in South Slavic languages etc.). Milling existed in hunter-gatherer communities, and later millers were important to the development of agriculture.

The materials ground by millers are often foodstuffs and particularly grain. The physical grinding of the food allows for the easier digestion of its nutrients and saves wear on the teeth. Non-food substances needed in a fine, powdered form, such as building materials, may be processed by a miller.

== Quern-stone ==
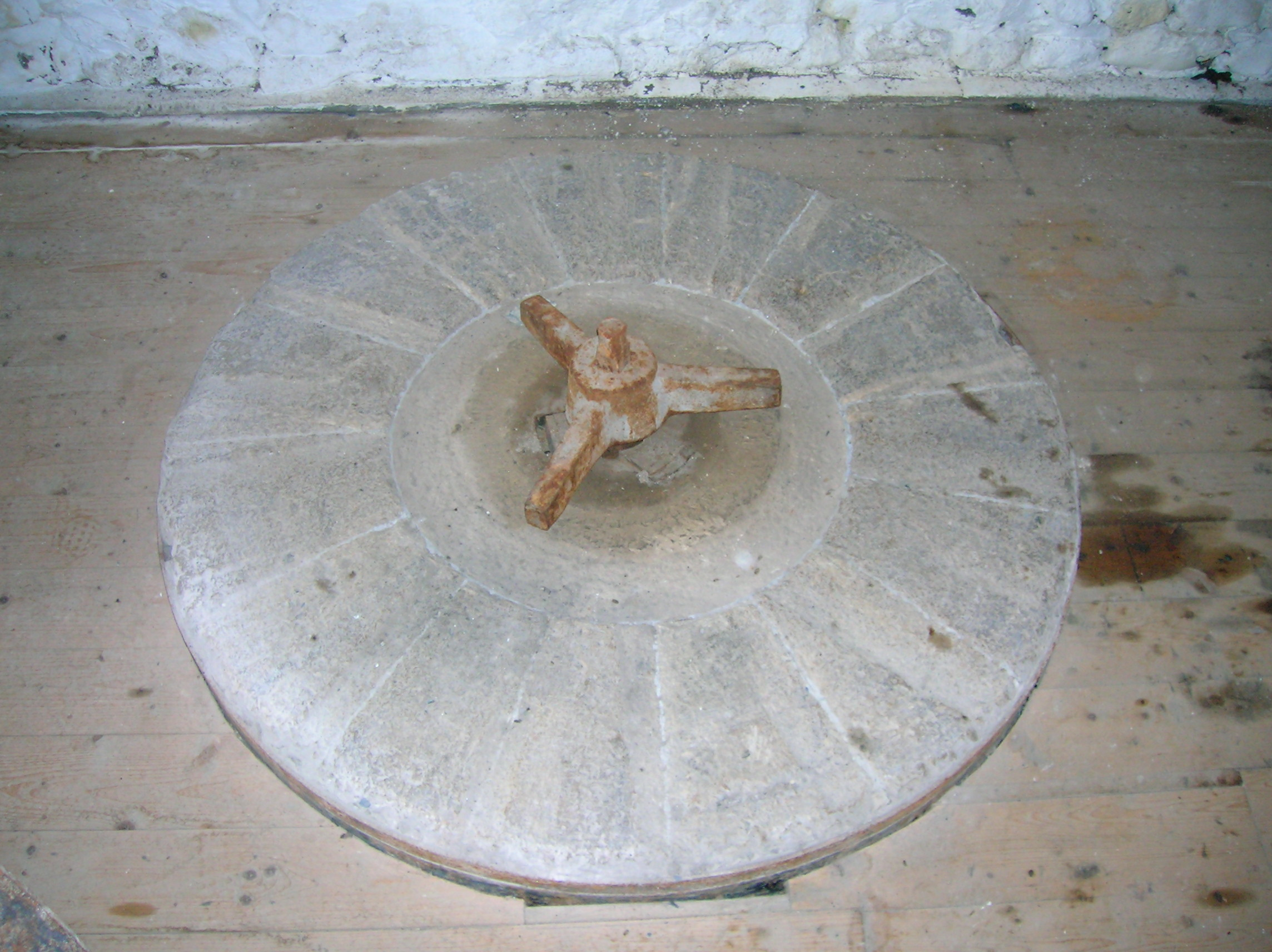
A bedstone and rind. Dalgarven Mill, Scotland.

The most basic tool for a miller was the quern-stone—simply a large, fixed stone as a base and another movable stone operated by hand, similar to a mortar and pestle. As technology and millstones (the bedstone and rynd) improved, more elaborate machines such as watermills and windmills were developed to do the grinding work. These mills harnessed available energy sources including animal, water, wind, and electrical power. Mills are some of the oldest factories in human history, so factories making other items are sometimes known as mills, for example, cotton mills and steel mills. These factory workers are also called millers.

The rynd in pre-reformation Scotland was often carved on millers' gravestones as a symbol of their trade.

== Status ==
In a traditional rural society, a miller is often wealthier than ordinary peasants, which can lead to jealousy. Millers are often accused of associating with thieves, and were targeted in bread riots at times of famine. Conversely, millers might be in a stronger position vis-a-vis feudal land owners than are ordinary peasants.

== Carnival ==
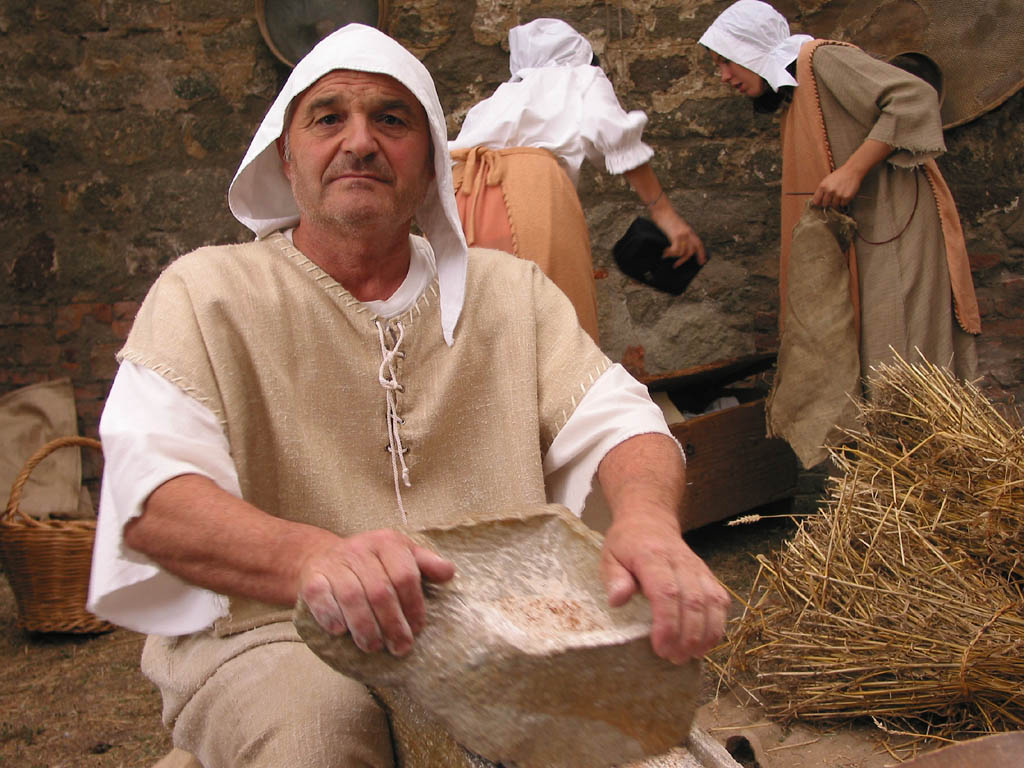
A man dressed as a medieval miller at a festival in Monselice, in Italy.

The traditional carnival held annually in the city of Ivrea, Italy, commemorates a spirited "Mugnaia" (miller's daughter) who supposedly refused to let a local duke exercise his right of the first night, and proceeded to chop the duke's head off and spark a revolution. Whatever the historical validity of the story, it is significant it was the daughter of a miller to whom folk tradition assigned this rebellious role.

== Miller's thumb ==
As an important part of his job, the miller repeatedly takes into his hand samples of the ground meal coming out of the spout in order to feel the quality and character of the product. The miller rubs the grain between his thumb and forefinger. After years of doing this, the miller's thumb changes shape and becomes broad and flattened. This is known as a "miller's thumb".

Sayings such as "worth a millerˈs thumb" and "an honest miller hath a golden thumb" refers to the profit the miller makes as a result of this skill.

The shape of a miller's thumb is said to have the appearance of the head of a fish. The European bullhead (Cottus gobio), a freshwater fish, is commonly called a miller's thumb for this reason.

== Surname ==
Miller (also known as Millar) is a common surname derived from the old English surname Milleiir. The name, and its many other variants, can be found widely across Europe in countries like the UK, Ireland, USA, and many other countries across the world.

== See also ==
- Gristmill, a name for grain mills
- Medieval watermills, a list of early medieval watermills
- Belgian Millers
- The Miller's Tale (Chaucer, 1380s)
