= Teunis Mulder =

Teunis Mulder may refer to:

- Teun Mulder (born 1981), Dutch track cyclist
- Tony Mulder (born 1955), Dutch-born Australian politician

== See also ==
- Mulder (surname)
