= Smolders =

Smolders is a surname. Notable people with the surname include:

- Hannes Smolders (born 1998), Belgian footballer
- Hans Smolders (born 1960), Dutch politician, former ice hockey player and entrepreneur
- Harrie Smolders (born 1980), Dutch equestrian
- Marinde Smolders (born 2000), Dutch wheel gymnast
- Paul Smolders (1921–1997), Belgian painter
- Tim Smolders (born 1980), Belgian footballer

== See also ==
- 10983 Smolders, a main-belt asteroid
- Smulders
