= Laurent Baheux =

French photographer

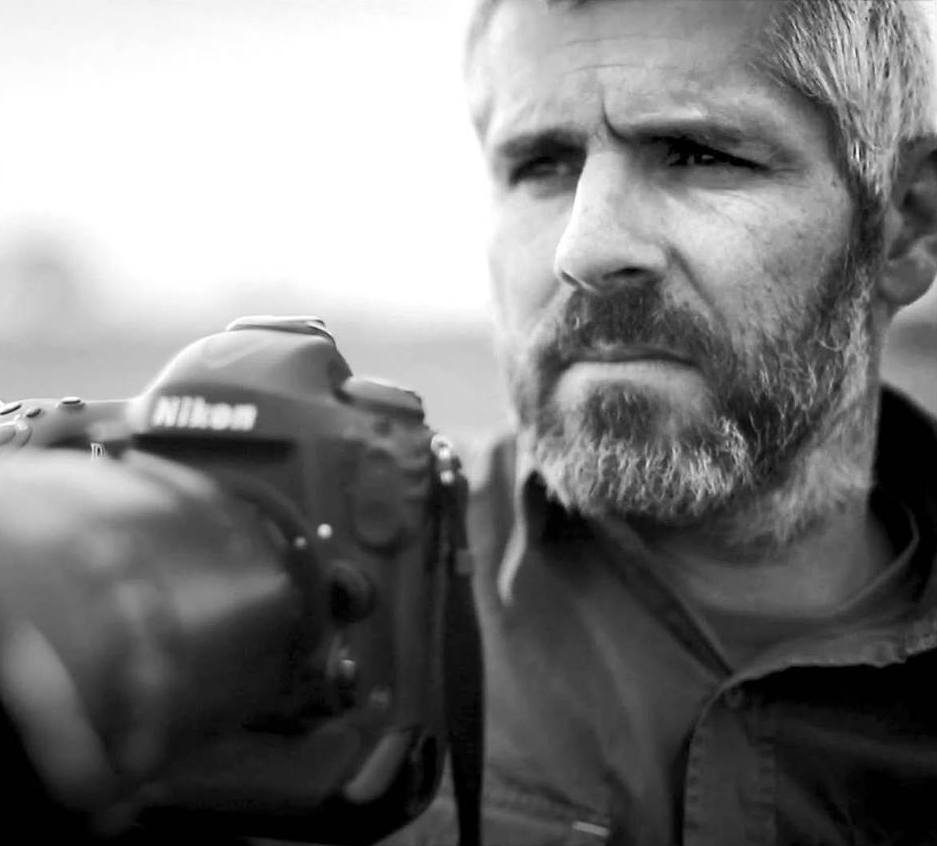
Laurent Baheux

Laurent Baheux (French pronunciation: [lɔʁɑ̃ baø]; born 1970) is a French photographer known for high contrast black and white photographs of nature and wildlife.

Baheux's work about Africa and wildlife is featured in art photography galleries worldwide and in awareness campaigns for conservation and environmental organizations including World Wildlife Fund (WWF), GoodPlanet Foundation, and United Nations Environment Programme (UNEP). He is a UNEP Goodwill Ambassador for the anti-poaching initiative with images being featured in the "Wild and Precious" International Airport Exhibition.

== Style ==
Drawing inspiration from photographers such as Ansel Adams, Peter Beard, Henri Cartier-Bresson, Sebastiao Salgado and Richard Avedon, Baheux's images are high contrast with very deep blacks. His work is often associated with that of portraitists such as the French photography Studio Harcourt.

Baheux works with NIKON products and uses very large lenses to capture the animal's personalities without disturbing their environment.

== Award & Honors ==
- 2007 Shell Wildlife Photographer of the Year in the "Creative Vision of Nature" category for his image Lions tail taken in Kenya (Africa) in 2006.
- 2008 WWF Biodiversity price of the International Festival of the Environment Image of Paris (France).
- 2014 Honorable mention in Portfolio category - Black and White Magazine.
- 2014 Honorable mention in Portfolio category - Adore Noir Magazine.
- 2014 Honorable mention in Animal World category - World Mountains, Nature and Adventure Photography Competition Memorial Maria Luisa.
- 2014 Honorable mention in Wildlife/Animal category - Fine Art Photography Awards.
- 2016 Nominated at German Phonebook Award with The Family Album of Wild Africa (teNeues & YellowKorner conditions)
- 2016 Honorable mention in Wildlife category - Moscow International Foto Awards.

== Books ==
- 2008 Photographes de nature, Actes Sud
- 2009 Terre des lions, Altus
- 2010 Africa (Portfolio n°1), YellowKorner
- 2011 D’ivoire et d’ébène, Altus
- 2012 Africa (art book edition), YellowKorner
- 2013 Africa (Classic edition), YellowKorner
- 2013 Wild and Precious, La Martinière with GoodPlanet
- 2015 America (Portfolio n°27), Yellowkorner
- 2015 The Family Album of Wild Africa, teNeues and Yellowkorner editions
- 2016 The Family Album of Wild Africa Collector's Prints, teNeues and Yellowkorner editions
- 2017 Ice is Black, teNeues editions
- 2017 The Family Album of Wild Africa, Small format edition, teNeues editions
- 2018 Animalité, avec Audrey Jougla, Atlande editions
