= Fokion Zissiadis =

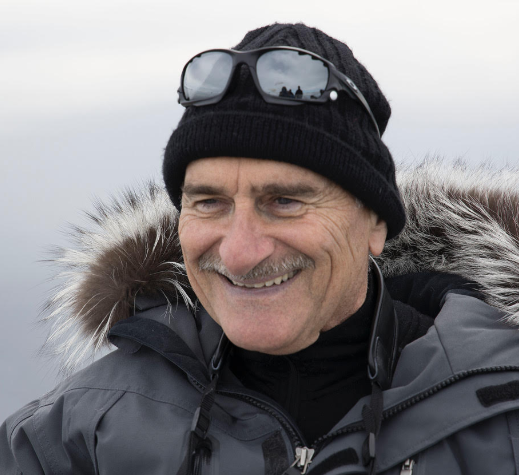
- Born: 1956 (age 69–70); Thessaloniki, Greece
- Education: Aristotle University of Thessaloniki (Architecture), University of Pennsylvania (MArch)
- Occupations: Photographer, tourism executive
- Years active: 2016–present (as photographer)
- Known for: Large-scale fine art landscape photography, "Icebergs from Genesis to Extinction" exhibition
- Website: fokionzissiadis.com

Fokion Zissiadis (Greek: Φωκίων Ζησιάδης; born 1956) is a Greek photographer known for his large-scale, fine-art landscape photography. He focuses on remote natural environments and geological phenomena in locations such as Greenland and Iceland. His work on Vietnam received an Award from the Vietnamese Ministry of Foreign Affairs. Trained as an architect, Zissiadis spent decades as an executive in the tourism sector before devoting himself fully to photography and adventure travel in 2016.

== Early life and career ==
Fokion Zissiadis was born in Thessaloniki, Greece, in 1956. He studied architecture at the Aristotle University of Thessaloniki. He later completed a master's degree at the University of Pennsylvania in Philadelphia, US, graduating in 1983.

Following his studies, Zissiadis worked in the hotel and tourism sector, continuing a family tradition. From 1989 to 2016, he served as one of the main shareholders and Vice President of Sani S.A., known for the Sani Resort in Halkidiki. He was part of the second generation that contributed to the expansion of the resort facilities.

Zissiadis first developed an interest in photography during his architecture student years, initially focusing on photographing buildings and urban landscapes. In 2015, following a shareholder decision regarding the company, Zissiadis made the decision to exit the tourism business. By 2016, he dedicated himself entirely to landscape photography and organizing solo adventure travel expeditions.

Since 1979 he has been married to Mata Tsolozidis (Mata Tsolozidi-Zissiadis) owner of the "George Tsolozidis Collection" including antiquities of 7.000 years of history. She often accompanies him on his photographic journeys.

== Photography career ==
Zissiadis's photographic work is characterized by a personal approach to landscapes. He has stated he seeks to preserve a wide-angle "view through a personal window" on the world. His work transitioned from urban landscapes to nature, using geometry to interpret the landscape and emphasizing the genius loci (spirit of the place).

=== Themes and technique ===
Zissiadis's projects cover diverse terrains, including glaciers, savannahs, jungles, Volcanoes, and deserts. His expeditions have taken him to locations such as Iceland, Greenland, Vietnam, Patagonia, Botswana, Namibia, China, and Morocco.

A recurring characteristic of his compositions is the inclusion of dwarfed human figures, which are intended to highlight the "insignificance of man when confronted with the grandeur and majesty of the natural world."

He employs Phase One camera systems for landscapes, Canon for wildlife, and Olympus for underwater shots.

=== Publications and exhibitions ===
Zissiadis's photography books have been published by teNeues and Rizzoli publishing houses.

Books

- Iceland (teNeues, 2016). His first book explored the geophysical phenomena of the Icelandic landscape.
- Vietnam (Rizzoli, 2020). This volume documents a 60-day expedition across Vietnam where Zissiadis covered approximately 6,000 kilometers. The book received the National Publication Award from the Vietnamese Ministry of Foreign Affairs in 2021.
- Greenland (teNeues, 2023). An XXL format book featuring 190 color photographs, including aerial shots documenting icy landscapes and the indigenous Inuit population.
- Morocco (teNeues, 2025). XXL book featuring 250 color photographs of the historic ruins of Volubilis, the "Blue City" of Chefchaouen and themarkets in Fez, Had Draa and Rissani, among others.

Exhibitions

His first solo photographic exhibition, Icebergs from Genesis to Extinction, was held at the Benaki Museum (Pireos Street annex) in Athens in 2019. Curated by Stavros Kavalaris, the exhibition focused on the "twofold personality" of icebergs—above and below sea level—referencing Archimedes' principle. The exhibition used OptiPlex technology for high-resolution prints to provide a 3D impression.
