= Moulder =

Moulder or variation, may refer to:

- Spindle moulder, a tool
- Moldmaker, a job
- A device for or a person who performs molding (process)
- To cover in mold (fungus)
- Moulder Peak, Mount Rosenthal, Liberty Hills, Heritage Range, Antarctica
- Anniston Moulders, Anniston, Alabama, USA; a minor league baseball team
- Moulder (surname)

== See also ==
- Maulder, the botanical author abbreviation for Ricky G. Maulder
- Peter Maulder, a New Zealand athlete at the 1998 Oceania Junior Athletics Championships
- Muldaur (surname)
- Mulder (surname)
- Molder (disambiguation)
- Mould (disambiguation)
