= Mulder =

Mulder is a surname of two possible origins: Dutch and German.

It may be Dutch language occupational surname. It is an archaic Dutch word for "miller" (modern Dutch: molenaar). With 38,207 people in the Netherlands named Mulder, it was the 12th most common name there in 2007. In Belgium the form De Mulder ("the miller") is more common.

The surname Mulder is also an occupational name of German origin, meaning "the maker of wooden bowls", from Middle High German mulde "bowl", "trough", or "tub" + the agent suffix -er.

Notable people with this name include:

== Mulder ==
- Agnes Mulder (born 1973), Dutch politician
- Allan Mulder (1928–2009), Australian politician
- Anne Mulder (born 1969), Dutch politician
- Anneke B. Mulder-Bakker (born 1940), Dutch historian
- Anthonie Rouwenhorst Mulder (1848–1901), Dutch engineer and foreign advisor in Japan
- Bob Mulder (born 1974), Dutch football player
- Boyito Mulder (born 1991), Dutch figure skater
- Bret Mulder (born 1964), Australian cricket player
- Catharina Mulder (1723–1798), Dutch orangist and riot leader
- Charles Mulder (1897–?), Belgian bobsledder and ice hockey player
- Connie Mulder (1925–1988), South African politician and minister
- Corné Mulder (born 1950s), South African politician
- Dave Mulder (born 1939), American politician from Iowa
- Dennis Mulder (born 1978), American politician from Florida
- Dikkie Mulder (born c. 1970s), South African rugby player
- Dustley Mulder (born 1985), Dutch-born Curaçaoan footballer
- Edgar Mulder (born 1961), Dutch politician
- Eduard Mulder (1832–1924), Dutch chemist, son of Gerardus
- Eefke Mulder (born 1977), Dutch field hockey player
- Elisabeth Mulder (1904–1987), Spanish writer, poet, translator, and journalist
- Erwin Mulder (born 1989), Dutch football player
- Frank Mulder (born 1946), Dutch rower
- Frederick Mulder (born 1943), Canadian-British art dealer and philanthropist
- Frits Mulder (fl. 1928), Belgian sailor
- Gerardus Johannes Mulder (1802–1880), Dutch organic chemist
- Gerben Mulder (born 1972), Dutch artist in the U.S. and Brazil
- Gertjan Mulder (born 1975), Belgian-born Dutch rapper known as "Brainpower"
- Gino Mulder (born 1987), Aruban footballer in the Netherlands
- Grant R. Mulder (born 1940s), U.S. Air Force Major General
- Hans Mulder (born 1987), Dutch football player
- Hans Mulder (scientist) (born 1969), Dutch computer scientist and enterprise engineer
- Hendrik Mulder (born c. 1970s), South African rugby player
- Herman Mulder (born c.1948), Dutch sustainable finance and investment writer
- Ineke Mulder (born 1950), Dutch politician
- Jacob Mulder (born 1995), Australian-born Irish cricketer
- Jacob D. Mulder (1901–1965), Dutch surgeon and podiatrist who developed the physical exam Mulder's sign
- Jakoba Mulder (1900–1988), Dutch architect and urban designer
- Jan Mulder (footballer) (born 1945), Dutch football player, writer, columnist, and TV personality
- Jan Mulder (musician) (born 1963), Dutch-American pianist, composer, and conductor
- Jan Mulder (politician) (born 1943), Dutch politician
- Japie Mulder (born 1969), South African rugby player
- Jean Mulder (linguist) (born 1954), American linguist
- John Mulder (1865–1941), American politician from Wisconsin
- Jonathan Mulder (born 2002), Dutch-Israeli footballer
- Joseph Mulder (1658–1742), Dutch engraver and printmaker
- Karen Mulder (born 1970), Dutch supermodel and singer, sister of Saskia
- Lau Mulder (1927–2006), Dutch field hockey goalkeeper
- Leland E. Mulder (1925–1993), American politician from Wisconsin
- Machteld Mulder (born 1989), Dutch middle-distance runner
- Mandy Mulder (born 1987), Dutch competitive sailor
- Mark Mulder (born 1977), American baseball pitcher
- Maud Mulder (born 1981), Dutch pop singer and field hockey player
- Mauricio Mulder (born 1956), Peruvian politician
- Michel Mulder (born 1986), Dutch speed skater, twin brother of Ronald
- Mychal Mulder (born 1994), Canadian basketball player
- Pieter Mulder (born 1951), South African politician
- Raoul Mulder (born 1960s), Australian ornithologist and evolutionary ecologist
- Richard Mulder (1938–2022), American physician and politician
- Rick Mulder (born 1996), Dutch football player
- Ronald Mulder (born 1986), Dutch speed skater, twin brother of Michel
- Samuel Israel Mulder (1792–1862), Dutch-Jewish educationist
- Saskia Mulder (born 1973), Dutch film and television actress, sister of Karen
- Scott Mulder (born 1992), Canadian track cyclist
- Silvia Mulder (born 1954), Argentine psychologist, professor and researcher
- Terry Mulder (born 1952), Australian politician from Victoria
- Teun Mulder (born 1981), Dutch track cyclist
- Tony Mulder (born 1955), Dutch-born Australian police officer and politician from Tasmania
- Tyler Mulder (born 1987), American athlete
- Wiaan Mulder (born 1998), South African cricketer
- Willemijn Mulder (born 2000), Dutch rower
- Youri Mulder (born 1969), Dutch football player and manager, son of footballer Jan

== De Mulder / Demulder ==
- Françoise Demulder (1947–2008), French war photographer
- Frank De Mulder (born 1963), Belgian photographer
- Frans De Mulder (1937–2001), Belgian racing cyclist
- Geoff De Mulder (1930–2009), English greyhound trainer
- Gustave De Mulder (1888–?), Belgian rower
- Marcel De Mulder (1928–2011), Belgian racing cyclist
- Prosper De Mulder (1917–2012), English businessman who built the Prosper De Mulder Group
- Robert Demulder (1900–1967), Belgian rower

== Mulders ==
- Fred Mulders (1911–1960), Dutch guitarist
- Jamilon Mülders (born 1976), German field hockey coach
- Paul Mulders (born 1981), Filipino football midfielder
- Rik Mulders, Dutch football player
- Rob Mulders (1967–1998), Dutch road racing cyclist

== Fictional characters ==
- From The X-Files:
  - Fox Mulder, FBI Special Agent and lead character
  - Bill Mulder, Fox's legal father
  - Samantha Mulder, Fox's half sister
  - Teena Mulder, Fox's mother

== See also ==
- Smulders
- Molenaar
- Muldaur
- Moulder (disambiguation)
- Molder (disambiguation)
