= Molder =

Molder or Molders or variation, may refer to:

- Same as Moulder

== People ==
- Mölder, an Estonian surname
- Mölders (disambiguation), a German surname
- Bryce Molder (born 1979), U.S. golfer
- Jan de Molder (16th century), Dutch Renaissance woodcarver

== Other uses ==
- German destroyer Mölders (D186), Cold War West German Bundesmarine Lütjens-class guided-missile destroyer
- Jagdgeschwader 51, called “JG 51 Mölders” from 1942 on, was a Luftwaffe fighter wing during World War II
- Jagdgeschwader 74, called “JG 74 Mölders” between 1973 and 2005, is an aviation unit of the German Luftwaffe, based on Neuburg air base in Bavaria

== See also ==
- Carmen Nicole Moelders, U.S. atmospheric scientist
- Muldaur (surname)
- Mulder (surname)
- Moulder (disambiguation)
- Mold (disambiguation)
