= Martin Schoeller =

German portrait photographer

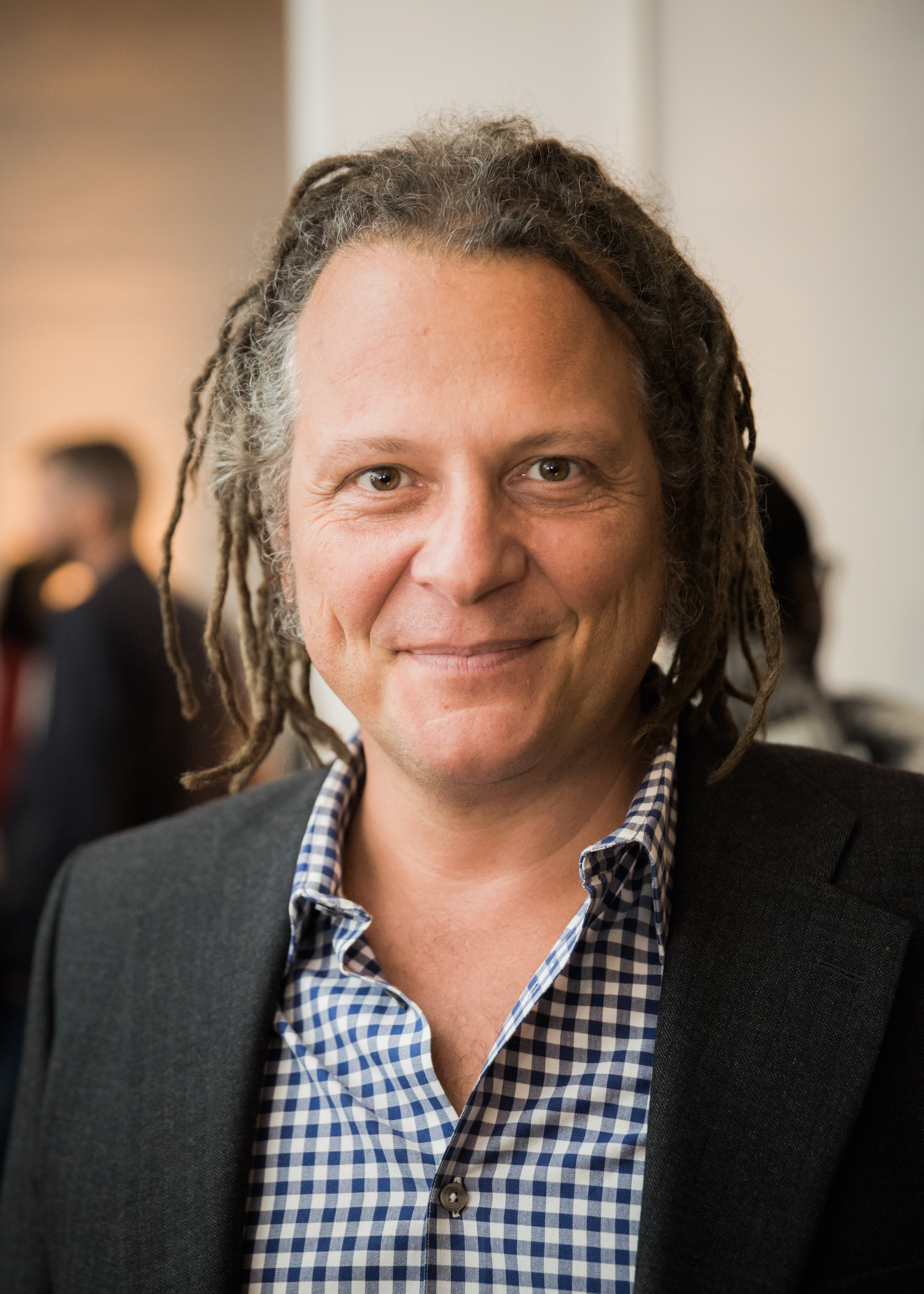
- Schoeller in 2017
- Born: Martin Schoeller; March 12, 1968 (age 58); Munich, West Germany
- Education: Lette-Verein
- Website: martinschoeller.com

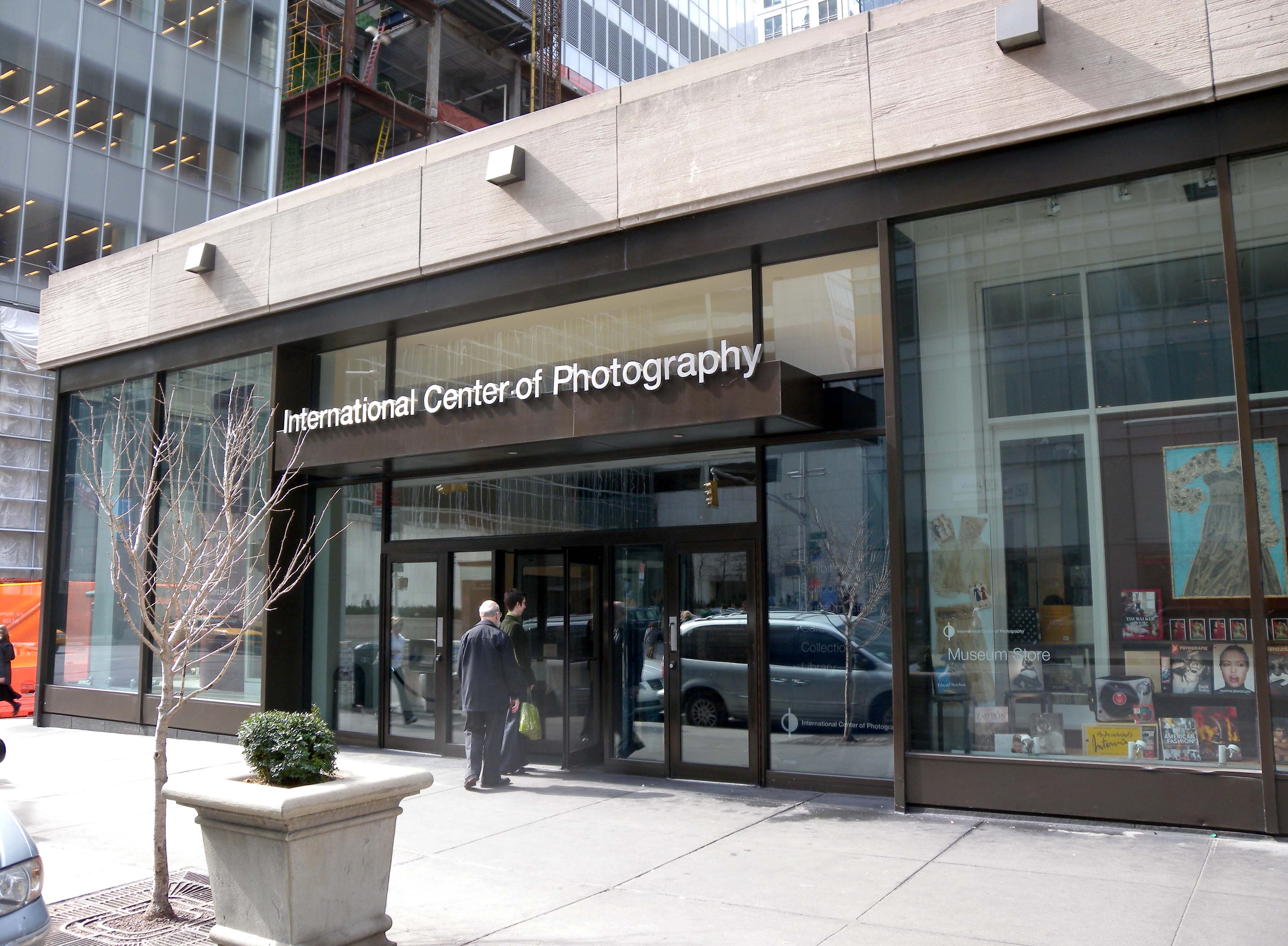
International Center of Photography, New York

Martin Schoeller (born March 12, 1968) is a German portrait photographer. He is most known for his extreme close-up portraits, a series in which familiar faces are treated with the same scrutiny as the unfamous. The stylistic consistency of this work creates a democratic platform for comparison between his subjects, challenging a viewer’s existing notions of celebrity, value and honesty. His work appears in National Geographic Magazine, The New Yorker, New York Times Magazine, Vanity Fair, TIME, GQ, Rolling Stone, GQ, Vogue, among others. In June 2025, he was honored at the Lucie Awards for his Achievement in Portraiture.

== Early life and education ==
Born in Munich, Germany on March 12, 1968. In his early years he was influenced by photographers August Sander, Bernd Becher, and Hilla Becher. Schoeller studied photography at Lette-Verein in Berlin.

== Career ==
Schoeller started his career in Germany, and came to New York in 1993 and worked as an assistant for Annie Leibovitz from 1993 to 1996. Here he developed his "big head" portrait technique, a term coined by him, of his style of "hyper-detailed close ups", which later gave him worldwide acclaim. He left in 1996 to pursue his freelancing career. Soon his street portraits started getting published in Rolling Stone, GQ, Esquire, Entertainment Weekly, and W. In 1999, Schoeller joined Richard Avedon as a contributing portrait photographer to The New Yorker since then.

Over the years, his large-scale portraits have been exhibited at various museums and galleries worldwide. A book of his portraits was published by teNeues in 2005: "Close Up: Portraits 1998-2005", consisting of 75 tight portraits, put together from over 300 shoots with various celebrities.

Another, "Female Bodybuilders," was published by Pond Press in 2008. Stern published a portfolio of his work, "Fotographie Portfolio #54", also in 2008. He shot the controversial cover of the May 21, 2012 issue of Time magazine about attachment parenting. In his book "Identical: Portraits of Twins" by teNeues, he examines 40 sets of identical twins and multiples in his distinctive close-up style. His book "Portraits", published in 2014 by teNeues, features a 15-year retrospective of his environmental portraiture. He also launched simultaneous exhibitions in Berlin and New York City featuring the work upon release of the book.

In 2017 to celebrate their centennial, Forbes Magazine assigned Schoeller to photograph the '100 Greatest Living Business Minds'.

In 2018 he published his book, "Close" by Steidl, which features celebrities, musicians, politicians, businessmen, the homeless, and many more individuals from his various projects throughout the years. All the images are shot in Schoeller's iconic "close up" portraiture style. The same year he was commissioned by Out Magazine to photograph 109 subjects for the publication's annual portfolio, which highlights the most influential and compelling members of the LGBTQIA+ community of the year.

In 2019 he was assigned by New York Magazine to photograph drag queens at DragCon Los Angeles. Schoeller photographed 37 subjects, marking the beginning of his project photographing queens in Los Angeles, New York, Berlin, and London. His newest monograph, "Drag Queens" is in production, set to be published by Steidl in 2025.

In 2020 "Works" by Steidl was published, containing images that span Schoeller's expansive career and personal projects. The same year, "Survivors: Faces of Life after the Holocaust" by Steidl was published, which features 75 portraits of survivors of the Holocaust, all photographed in cooperation with the World Holocaust Remembrance Center Yad Vashem in Jerusalem, Israel. Schoeller also photographed, interviewed, and filmed death row exonerees around the U.S. in partnership with Witness to Innocence. This project continued on to exhibit at Fotografiska in New York, NY. and was published in National Geographic.

"WE ALL BLEED RED" a documentary about the life and career of Schoeller, directed by Josephine Links and produced by Achtung Panda!, debuted at Doc NYC in 2024. His lighting work for the "Power to the Patients" video campaigns also received an Emmy the same year.

In 2025, Schoeller received the award for Achievement of Portraiture at the Lucie Awards.

His work is a part of the Permanent Collection of the Smithsonian National Portrait Gallery.

== Personal life ==
Married to Helen Rutman-Schoeller, an art director, in 2000. He currently lives and works in Manhattan, New York.

== Honors ==
- 2025 – Lucie Awards – Achievement in Portraiture
- 1998-2025 – American Photography Photo Annual
- 2024 – Emmy Awards – Public Service Announcement (Single Spot): Lighting Design
- 2024 – Choose Creativity Awards – Martin Schoeller for Curious Photography
- 1999-2024 – Communication Arts Photo Annual
- 2019 – Winner, Black Pencil, D&AD Awards – Colin Kaepernick, Nike “Just Do It” Campaign
- 2018 – Winner, Outdoor Grand Prix at Cannes Lion – Colin Kaepernick, Nike “Just Do It” Campaign
- 2016 – Finalist, Best Covers, National Magazine Awards: American Society of Magazine Editors – “The Reign of Kevin Hart” The Hollywood Reporter
- 2015 – Finalist, Best Covers, National Magazine Awards: American Society of Magazine Editors – “Saint Bill [Murray]” Variety
- 2015 – Medal Finalist, Society of Publication Designers – “The Bodies We Want: Travis & Lyn-Z Pastrana” ESPN
- 2015 – Medal Finalist, Society of Publication Designers – “Saint Bill [Murray]” Variety
- 2014 – Winner, Best Covers, National Magazine Awards: American Society of Magazine Editors – “Michael Douglas is Liberace” New York Magazine
- 2014 – Medal Finalist, Society of Publication Designers – “Bloomberg” New York Magazine
- 2014 – Merit Winner, Society of Publication Designers – “The Flight Risk” The New York Times Mag.
- 2014 – Merit Winner, Society of Publication Designers – “Sonny Rollins, the Colossus” Men's Journal
- 2013 – Medal Finalist, Society of Publication Designers – “Tastemakers” Bon Appétit
- 2013 – Merit Winner, Society of Publication Designers – “Twins” National Geographic
- 2013 – Merit Winner, Society of Publication Designers – “Diane von Furstenberg” Boston Common
- 2012 – Best of 2012: National Geographic Magazine Photos of the Year – “Johanna & Eva Gill”
- 2012 – Top 10 Photos of 2012, TIME Magazine – “Gabby Douglas”
- 2012 – Best Photo Book 2012, American Photo Magazine – “Identical: Portraits of Twins”
- 2012 – Gold Medal, Society of Publication Designers – “Zach Galifianakis” GQ
- 2012 – Merit Winner, Society of Publication Designers – “Ashrita Furman” The New Yorker
- 2012 – Merit Winner, Society of Publication Designers – “TIME 100” TIME Magazine
- 2011 – Medal Finalist, Society of Publication Designers – “Rheinmaidens” The New Yorker
- 2011 – Merit Winner, Society of Publication Designers – “Marina Abramovic” The New Yorker
- 2011 – Merit Winner, Society of Publication Designers – “Marina Abramovic” Stern
- 2011 – Merit Winner, Society of Publication Designers – “April Bloomfield” The New Yorker
- 2011 – Cover Merit Winner, Society of Publication Designers – “Kobe Bryant” SLAM Magazine
- 2001-2010 – Photo District News Photo Annual
- 2010 – Winner, Best Covers, American Society of Magazine Editors – “Men of the Year Issue” GQ
- 2010 – Finalist, National Magazine Awards: Photo Portfolio, American Society of Magazine Editors – “The Hadza” National Geographic
- 2010 – Gold Medal, Society of Publication Designers – “The Hadza” National Geographic
- 2010 – Medal Finalist, Society of Publication Designers – “The Actress” The New Yorker
- 2010 – Medal Finalist, Society of Publication Designers – “Men of the Year Portfolio” GQ
- 2009 – Best of 2009: National Geographic Magazine Photos of the Year – “Nija”
- 2009 – Medal Finalist, Society of Publication Designers – “Marc Jacobs Doesn’t Give a F***” GQ
- 2009 – Finalist, National Magazine Awards: Best in Entertainment/Celebrity Covers, American Society of Magazine Editors – “How to Be a Man” Issue Esquire
- 2008 – Best Portrait Award, American Photo Images of the Year
- 2008 – Finalist, National Magazine Awards: Photojournalism, American Society of Magazine Editors – “The Interpreter” The New Yorker
- 2008 – Cover Finalist, Society of Publication Designers – “American Gangster” Entertainment Weekly
- 2008 – Medal Finalist, Society of Publication Designers – “George Clooney” Entertainment Weekly
- 2008 – Merit Award, Society of Publication Designers – “Chill Will” Premiere Magazine
- 2008 – Merit Award: Entire Issue, Society of Publication Designers – GQ
- 2006 – Best Celebrity Cover 2nd Place, Magazine Publishers of America – “Steve Carell” Premiere Magazine
- 2004 – Gold Medal, Society of Publication Designers – “Tigers of the Snow: Three Generations of Great Climbing Sherpas” Outside Magazine
- 2004 – Finalist, National Magazine Awards: Photo Portfolio/Essay, American Society of Magazine Editors – “Tigers of the Snow: Three Generations of Great Climbing Sherpas” Outside Magazine
- 2002 – Silver Medal, Society of Publication Designers – “Hip Hop Portfolio” The New Yorker
- 2001 – Gold Medal, Society of Publication Designers – “Sports Portfolio” The New Yorker
- 2000 – Silver Medal, Society of Publication Designers – “Cheerleaders” Rolling Stone
- 2000 – Best New Talent, LIFE Magazine Alfred Eisenstaedt Awards

== Solo exhibitions ==
- 2025 "Works" Xposure International Photography Festival (Sharjah, U.A.E.)
- 2023 "Close Up" Camera Work Gallery (Berlin, Germany)
- 2023 "Survivors: Faces of Life after the Holocaust" Federal Ministry of Finance (Berlin, Germany)
- 2023 "Power to the Patients" White House Correspondents Dinner Kick-Off Event (Washington D.C.)
- 2023 "A Million More" Volvo Headquarters (Gothenburg, Sweden)
- 2022 "Survivors: Faces of Life after the Holocaust" Museum of Jewish Heritage (New York, NY)
- 2022 "Survivors: Faces of Life after the Holocaust" Projekt 105 (New York, NY)
- 2021 "Drag Queens" Projekt 105 (New York, NY)
- 2021 "A Million More" Fotografiska (New York, NY)
- 2021 "Survivors: Faces of Life after the Holocaust" Fotomuseum aan het Vrijthof (Maastricht, Netherlands)
- 2020 “Close” XPM Photography Museum (Changsha, China)
- 2020 “Death Row Exonerees” Fotografiska (New York, NY)
- 2020 “Close Up” Camera Work (Berlin, Germany)
- 2020 “Works” NRW Forum (Düsseldorf, Germany)
- 2020 “Survivors: Faces of Life after the Holocaust” Zeche Zollverein (Essen, Germany)
- 2019 “Close”, Shanghai Center of Photography (Shanghai, China)
- 2018 “Big Heads” Nederlands Fotomuseum (Rotterdam, Netherlands)
- 2015 "Martin Schoeller: Up Close", Fotografiska (Stockholm, Sweden)
- 2014 "Portraits", Hasted Kraeutler Gallery (New York, NY)
- 2014 "Portraits", CWC Gallery (Berlin, Germany)
- 2013 "Close Up", EMP Museum (Seattle, WA)
- 2013 "Identical: Portraits of Twins", Ace Gallery (Beverly Hills, CA)
- 2013 "Female Bodybuilders", Drew University (Madison, NJ)
- 2013 "Close Up", Eastern Illinois University (Charleston, IL)
- 2012 "Close Up", Naples Museum of Art (Naples, FL)
- 2012 "Close Up", Boca Raton Museum of Art (Boca Raton, Florida)
- 2011 "Behind the Mask", Museum the Kennedys (Berlin, Germany)
- 2010 "Close Up", National Portrait Gallery (Canberra, Australia)
- 2010 "Close Up & Female Bodybuilders", Hasted Hunt Kraeutler Gallery (New York, NY)
- 2009 "Martin Schoeller: Portraits", A. galerie (Paris, France)
- 2008 "Female Bodybuilders", Ace Gallery (Beverly Hills, CA)
- 2008 "Close Up", Hasted Hunt Gallery (New York, NY)
- 2007 "Close Up", Ace Gallery (Beverly Hills, CA)
- 2007 "Close Up", Bernard Toale Gallery (Boston, MA)
- 2007 "Close Up", Griffin Museum of Photography (Winchester, MA)
- 2006 "Close Up", Brancolini Grimaldi Contemporary Art (Florence, Italy)
- 2006 "Close Up", Galerie Wouter van Leeuwen (Amsterdam, the Netherlands)
- 2006 "Close Up", Hasted Hunt Gallery (New York, NY)
- 2005 "Close Up", Camera Work (Berlin, Germany)
- 2005 "Close Up", Forma Galleria (Milan, Italy)

== Notable projects ==
- Photographing the Pirahã tribe in northwestern Brazil for The New Yorker
- Photographing the Hadza tribe in Tanzania for National Geographic
- Photographing the homeless clients of the Greater West Hollywood Food Coalition and posting the photos exclusively on Instagram to raise awareness of homelessness and support for the volunteer-run non profit
- Photographing 75 Holocaust Survivors in cooperation with the World Holocaust Remembrance Center Yad Vashem in Jerusalem, Israel
- Photographing Death Row Exonerees around the U.S. for his project in collaboration with Witness to Innocence.
- Photographing Drag Queens in New York, Los Angeles, Berlin, and London for his upcoming monograph, "Drag Queens"

== Schoeller's monographs ==
- Drag Queens by Steidl (Coming 2025)
- Works by Steidl (2020)
- Survivors – Faces of Life after the Holocaust by Steidl (2020)
- Close by Steidl (2018)
- Portraits by teNeues (2014)
- Identical: Portraits of Twins (2012)
- Martin Schoeller Stern Portfolio by teNeues (2009)
- Female Bodybuilders (2008)
- Close Up: Portraits 1998-2005 by teNeues (2005)
