= Matthew Rolston =

American photographer, music video director

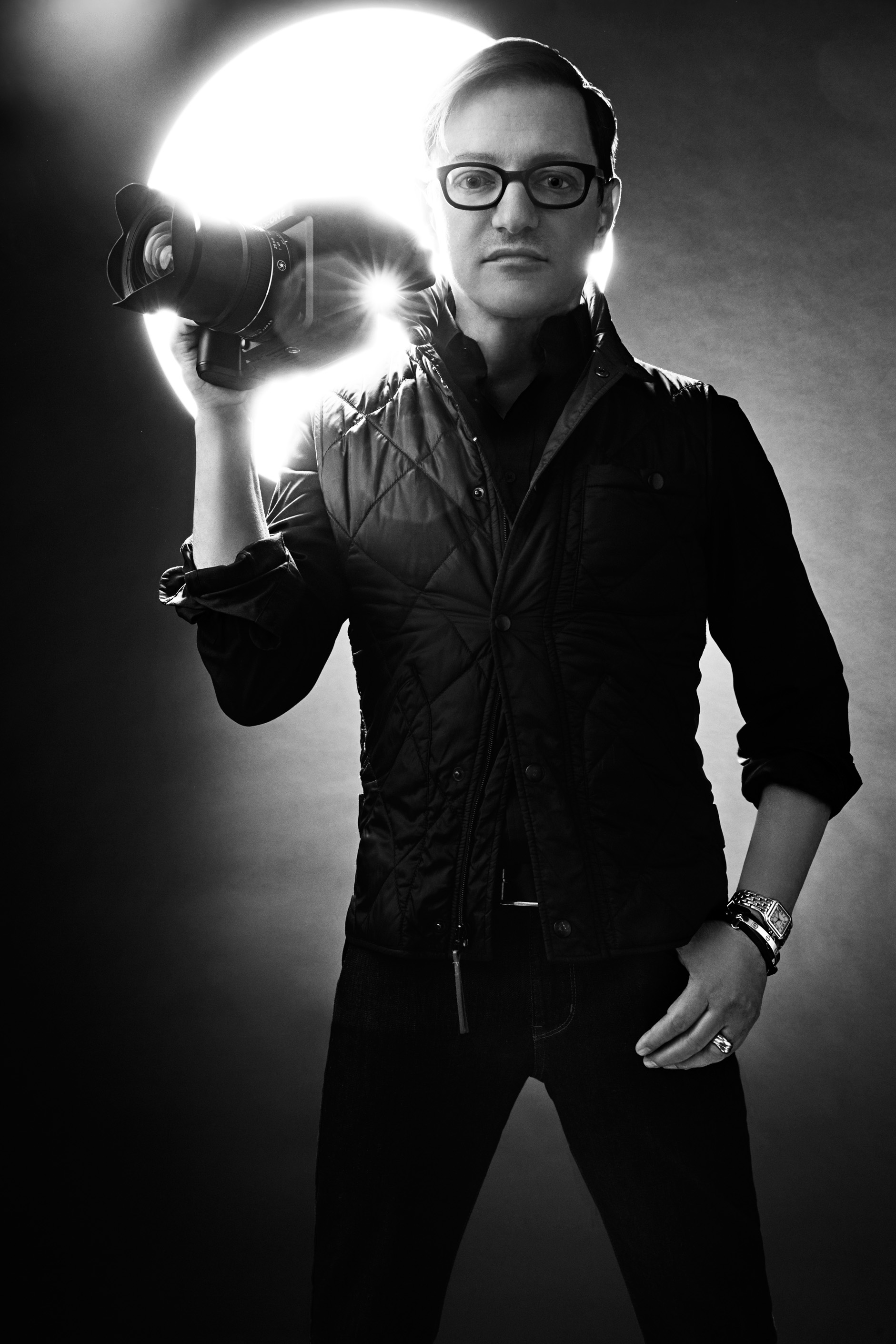
- Born: Matthew Russell Rolston; Los Angeles, California, United States
- Education: Chouinard Art Institute; Otis College of Art and Design; San Francisco Art Institute; ArtCenter College of Design
- Occupations: Photographer; director; creative director; artist
- Years active: 1977–present
- Website: matthewrolston.com

Matthew Russell Rolston is an American artist, photographer, director, creative director and educator, known for his lighting techniques and detailed approach to art direction and design. Rolston has been identified throughout his career with the revival and modern expression of Hollywood glamour.

Rolston's career spans photography, film, creative direction, experiential design, hospitality development, branding, product design, fine art, publishing, and arts education.

== Photography career ==
Born in Los Angeles, Rolston studied painting and drawing at the Chouinard Art Institute and Otis College of Art and Design, and in the Bay Area at the San Francisco Art Institute. He also studied drawing, photography, imaging, and filmmaking at ArtCenter College of Design in Pasadena, California. ArtCenter awarded him an honorary doctorate in 2006. In 2025, ArtCenter conferred Rolston its Lifetime Achievement Award, placing him in the company of other prominent photography and fine art alumni, including the photographer Hiroshi Sugimoto, fine art documentarian Lee Friedlander, and multidisciplinary artist Doug Aitken.

While at ArtCenter, Rolston received an assignment from American artist Andy Warhol, for Warhol's celebrity-focused Interview magazine, which served as his "discovery". Thereafter, he began a successful career in photography. Rolston began shooting covers and editorial assignments for founding editor Jann Wenner of Rolling Stone, as well as for other publications such as Harper's Bazaar, Vogue, Vanity Fair, W and The New York Times Magazine. Rolston has completed thousands of photo shoots in his career, including over 100 covers for Rolling Stone.

Rolston's images have been exhibited at institutions and museums in solo and group shows including Queer Lens: A History of Photography, curated by Paul Martineau with work by Baron Adolf de Meyer, Richard Avedon, Peter Hujar, Andy Warhol, and others, at the J. Paul Getty Museum, Los Angeles, 2025; Beauty CULTure, co-curated by Manon Slome and Kohle Yohannan with work by Lauren Greenfield, Herb Ritts, Andres Serrano, Carrie Mae Weems, and others, at The Annenberg Space for Photography, Los Angeles, 2011; The Warhol Look: Glamour, Style, Fashion, with work by Richard Avedon, David Bailey, Robert Mapplethorpe, Steven Meisel, and others, curated by Mark Francis and Margery King, at The Whitney Museum of American Art, New York, 1997; and Fashion and Surrealism, curated by Richard Martin with work by David Bailey, Horst P. Horst, Man Ray, Bruce Weber, and others, at FIT Gallery, New York, 1987 (traveled to the Victoria & Albert Museum, London, UK, 1988).

A series of monographs has been published on Rolston's works, including:

- Big Pictures, A Book of Photographs (1991), a selection of images from the artist's first decade as a photographer, with an introduction by American film director Tim Burton. It was published by Bulfinch Press, New York.
- beautyLIGHT, Pictures at a Magazine (2008) surveys more than twenty years of Rolston's editorial portraits. It features an introduction by photographic curator, writer, and editor Ingrid Sischy and was published by teNeues, Germany.
- Talking Heads: The Vent Haven Portraits (2012), a fine art series consisting of large color portraits of ventriloquist dummies held in a rare museum collection. It was published by Pointed Leaf Press, New York.
- Hollywood Royale: Out of the School of Los Angeles (2017), a retrospective capturing the artist's work in mid-career. The publication includes an essay by former Vogue and Vanity Fair design director and writer Charles Churchward, and was published by teNeues, Germany.
- In 2021, Laguna Art Museum published Matthew Rolston, Art People: The Pageant Portraits, an exhibition catalog.
- Vanitas: The Palermo Portraits (2025) is a fine art series portraying Christian mummies from the Capuchin Catacombs of Sicily. The monograph contains an introduction by American photographic historian and critic Philip Gefter and was published by Nazraeli Press, California.

Twenty photographs by Rolston were donated to the J. Paul Getty Museum in 2024. Paul Martineau, Getty Curator of Photographs, directed the acquisition. The works include images from Rolston's Hollywood Royale retrospective.

Rolston's work is in the permanent collections of the Museum of Modern Art, New York, the Los Angeles County Museum of Art, and the National Portrait Gallery at The Smithsonian's Donald W. Reynolds Center for American Art and Portraiture in Washington D.C., and the J. Paul Getty Museum, Los Angeles.

== Film career ==
Rolston has conceived, written, and directed numerous film projects, having overseen more than 100 music videos and 200 television commercials in his career, including collaborations with artists including Madonna, Janet Jackson, Christina Aguilera, Beyoncé, and Miley Cyrus, along with numerous advertising campaigns – both print and television – for clients such as L'Oreal, Revlon, Estée Lauder, Clairol, Levi's, Pantene, Elizabeth Arden, Gap and Polo Ralph Lauren, among others.

Rolston established a documentary production unit called 'R-ROLL', a play on the industry term 'B-roll' for behind-the-scenes footage. The 'R' is for Rolston. According to Rolston, "There's an overwhelming demand for filmed content, as clients expand their reach beyond traditional media."

R-ROLL has produced projects for Time, Inc., Amazon.com, ESPN, A&E/Lifetime Networks, SBE Entertainment Group and Virgin Hotels among others. Rolston said, "We're now entering an era where the 'making of' is just as important as the 'of'. And clients seem to enjoy the integration of our media services. Print, film, design, documentary, you might say we're a 'one-stop-shop'."

Rolston has appeared as a guest on television programs including Bravo's Shear Genius and Make Me a Supermodel, and the CW's America's Next Top Model.

== Creative direction ==
Rolston diversified into creative direction and branding, developing experiential design projects across hospitality and product design.

His hospitality clients include Mahmood Khimji's Highgate Holdings, Sam Nazarian's SBE Entertainment Group, Richard Branson's Virgin Hotels and Barry Sternlicht's SH Hotels & Resorts.

In 2024, Rolston creative-directed recording artist Jewel in The Portal: An Art Experience by Jewel. Rolston developed a life-size hologram for her Crystal Bridges Museum of American Art collaboration in Arkansas.

== Fine art ==
Four fine art photography projects by Rolston became publications and exhibitions:

Talking Heads: The Vent Haven Portraits consists of monumentally-scaled color portraits of a collection of ventriloquial figures from the Vent Haven Museum in Fort Mitchell, Kentucky. This was Rolston's first self-initiated photography project and debuted at Diane Rosenstein Fine Art in Los Angeles. It has since travelled to Miami and Berlin, and other cities. The exhibition traveled with Rolston's third monograph.

Hollywood Royale: Out of the School of Los Angeles – Rolston's fourth monograph and a traveling exhibition – is a retrospective of his editorial portrait work from 1977 to 1993. Los Angeles gallerist David Fahey edited the collection, which captures 1980s talent including Cyndi Lauper, George Michael, Madonna, Michael Jackson, and Prince.

Art People: The Pageant Portraits is a series of portraits of participants of "Pageant of the Masters", a tableaux vivants event presented at Laguna Beach, California's annual arts festival. The work includes large-scale color prints; one installation spans over thirty feet. Ralph Pucci International showed the series at its Los Angeles gallery in 2017, and Laguna Art Museum mounted the work in summer 2021 as Rolston's first West Coast solo institutional exhibition.

Vanitas: The Palermo Portraits is another dramatically scaled color portrait series of Christian mummies from the Capuchin Catacombs of Sicily. According to Rolston, the series is "a meditation on mortality", exploring existential themes through portrait photography.

Rolston's fine art photography has been exhibited in galleries including CAMERA WORK in Berlin, Germany; Diane Rosenstein Fine Art, Ralph Pucci International, and Fahey/Klein Gallery, all in Los Angeles.

Rolston describes his artistic aim as "[posing] questions about the things that make us most human."

== Arts education and scholarships ==
In 1998, Rolston established the Matthew Rolston Scholarship for Film and Creative Direction at ArtCenter College of Design. Said Rolston, "the scholarship is intended to promote cross-disciplinary studies between film and other creative practices".

In 2015, Rolston became an adjunct professor and curricular advisor to ArtCenter College's Undergraduate and Graduate Film Departments, and continues to lecture and mentor there in marketing and communications strategy, fashion communications, luxury branding, and public service messaging. At ArtCenter, Rolston teaches two original courses that he conceived and wrote. The first, focusing on marketing communications, is titled "The Power of Pleasure." And the second class, named Conscious Communication, centers on public interest communications. Rolston's classes are situated within ArtCenter's film program; however, they invite students from various disciplines, including advertising and creative direction, photography and imaging, fine art, and other courses of study offered at the college.

Within the structure of the classes, students create short-form films in an atmosphere resembling a professional communications agency, with Rolston acting as instructor, mentor, and creative director, and the students working as writer/director 'makers'.

An illustrated textbook of Rolston's The Power of Pleasure, based on his syllabus and lectures, is currently under development.

Recognizing Otis College of Art and Design in Los Angeles as another significant Southern California institution that shaped Rolston's artistic formation, he created the "Matthew Rolston Scholarship Fund for Product and Fashion Design at Otis College." This fund supports product and fashion design students, with a focus on communication and creative direction skills.

In 2024, Rolston took on the role of senior lecturer at Otis College, focusing on object design and development. He collaborated with Jonathan Fidler, Otis' assistant chair of product design, to create a course called Vessel of Dreams: The Packaging of Perfumery, which explores the potential for communications inherent in luxury fragrance packaging.

== Books ==
- Matthew Rolston: Vanitas: The Palermo Portraits – Nazraeli Press, 2025
- Malcolm Warner, PhD.: Matthew Rolston, Art People: The Pageant Portraits – Laguna Art Museum, 2021
- Matthew Rolston: Hollywood Royale: Out of the School of Los Angeles – teNeues, 2017
- Matthew Rolston: Talking Heads: The Vent Haven Portraits – Pointed Leaf Press, 2012
- Matthew Rolston: beautyLIGHT: Pictures at a Magazine – teNeues, 2008
- Matthew Rolston: Big Pictures: A Book of Photographs – Bulfinch, 1991
- James Danziger: Visual Aid – Pantheon, October 12, 1986, pp. 51–69.
- Andy Warhol, Pat Hackett: The Andy Warhol Diaries – Warner Books, May 1989, pp. 599–600.
- Isabella Rossellini: 10 Years of Dolce & Gabbana – Leonardo Arte, Milan, 1996, pp. 137, 139, 209.
- Mark Francis, Margery King: The Warhol Look: Glamour Style Fashion – Bulfinch, October 1997, pp. 246, 252–253.
- Walter Hubert: Naked: Flowers Exposed – HarperCollins, 1997, pp. 131–132.
- Steve Reiss, Neil Feineman: Thirty Frames Per Second: The Visionary Art of the Music Video – Harry N. Abrams, October 1, 2000, pp. 26, 206–211.
- Henry Keazor, Thorsten Wübbena: Video Thrills The Radio Star. Musikvideos: Geschichte, Themen, Analysen – Bielefeld 2005, pp. 27.
- Trey Laird: Individuals: Portraits from the Gap Collection – Melcher Media, October 30, 2006, pp. 37, 59, 82, 94, 98, 104, 120, 230.
- Justyn Barnes, Nate Giorgio, David Nordahl Jordan Sommers: The Official Michael Jackson Opus – OPUS Media Group, December 7, 2009, "The Last Sitting," pp. 242–247.
- Tim Blanks: 20 Years of Dolce & Gabbana For Men, Mondadori Electa, 2010, pp, 97, 419.
- Charles Churchward: Herb Ritts: The Golden Hour: A Photographer's Life and His World – Rizzoli, October 26, 2010, pp. 74–77, 79, 82–83, 99, 130, 207, 295, 311.
- Kathy Ryan: The New York Times Magazine Photographs – Thames & Hudson, September 30, 2011, pp. 304–305.
- Graydon Carter: Vanity Fair 100 Years: From the Jazz Age to Our Age – Abrams, pp. 237
- Derek Blasberg: Harper's Bazaar: Models – Abrams, October 13, 2015, pp. 214–215.
- Josh Baker, Allen Jones: Naomi Campbell – Collector's Edition, TASCHEN, 2016, pp. 112, 237–238. Companion volume pp. 236, 246, 280, 321.
- Steven M. Price: Trousdale Estates: Midcentury to Modern in Beverly Hills – Regan Arts, January 2017, pp. 120–125.
- Joan Juliet Buck: The Price of Illusion: A Memoir – Illustrated Edition, Atria Books, March 2017, p. 158, Plate Section Two (p. 5).
- Jann S. Wenner, Jodi Peckman, Joe Levy: 50 Years of Rolling Stone, May 2017 – Abrams, pp. 216–7, 281.
- Claudia Campaña: Michael Jackson: Artes visuales y símbolos – Metales pesados, Ediciones, 2018, pp. 14–16.
- Michael Chow: Mr. Chow: 50 Years – DelMonico Books-Prestel, 2018, p. 134.
- Tim Street Porter, Annie Kelly: Splash: The Art of the Swimming Pool – Illustrated Edition, Rizzoli, April 2019, pp. 4 (dedication), 216–217.
- Ruth Reichl: Save Me the Plums: My Gourmet Memoir – Random House, April 2019, pp. 165–166.
- Paige Powell: Paige Powell: Beulah Land – Dashwood Books, May 2019, p. 229.
- Demi Moore: Inside Out: A Memoir – Harper, HarperCollins, September 2019, front cover image.
- Gary D. Rhodes, Robert Singer: Consuming Images: Film Art and the American Television Commercial – Edinburgh University Press, 2020, pp. 122–123.
- Sara Dallin, Keren Woodward: Really Saying Something: Sara & Keren – Our Banarama Story – Hutchinson, October 2020, Plate Section One, p. 10
- Enrico Bernardo: The Impossible Collection of Champagne: The 100 Most Exceptional Bottles from Champagne – Assouline, October 2022, pp. 100–101.
- Carla Sozzani, Olivier Saillard: Alaïa Afore Alaïa – Rizzoli International Publications, October 2022, pp. 308, 414.
- John Demsey, Alina Cho: Behind the Blue Door: A Maximalist Mantra – Vendome Press, October 2023, pp. 123–125, 230.
- Jeanne Beker: Heart On My Sleeve: Stories from a Life Well Worn – Simon & Schuster Canada, October 2024, pp. 155–157.
- David Silverman: Sierra Towers: A History – LA House Histories, 2024, pp. 213.
- Paul Martineau, Ryan Linkof: Queer Lens: A History of Photography – J. Paul Getty Museum, Los Angeles, May 2025, pp. vi, (plate J) 122, (plate 156) 241, 305, 309, 329.
- Sofia Coppola, Chanel: Haute Couture – Éditions 7L / Important Flowers, 2025, pp. 296, 443.

== Honors and awards ==
- 1992 MTV Video Music Awards, Nominee, Best Direction ("My Lovin'," En Vogue)
- 1999 AICP Awards, Award for Visual Style ("Khakis Swing," The GAP)
- 1999 AICP Awards, Award for Advertising Excellence ("Khakis Swing," The GAP)
- 2006 Honorary Doctorate, ArtCenter College of Design, Pasadena, CA
- 2007 MTV Video Music Awards, Nominee, Best Direction ("Candyman," Christina Aguilera)
- 2007 38th NAACP Image Awards, Outstanding Music Video Award ("Be Without You," Mary J. Blige)
- 2008 17th Annual MVPA Awards, Winner, Best Direction, Pop Video of the Year ("Candyman," Christina Aguilera)
- 2008 Hollywood Life Magazine's Hollywood Style Awards, Visionary Lens Master
- 2009 Pacific Design Center's Stars of Design Award, Honors in the Field of Photography
- 2015 Variety & WWD StyleMaker Awards, The Smashbox Visual Impact Award
- 2025 Lifetime Achievement Award, ArtCenter College of Design, Pasadena, CA
