= Mölder =

Family name

Mölder is an Estonian surname, an equivalent to the English Miller.

People with this surname include:

- August Mölder (1914–1982), Estonian-Australian artist who was part of the Six Directions collective
- Jaan Mölder (born 1987), Estonian rally driver
- Janika Mölder (born 1970), Estonian rhythmic gymnast and coach
- Maile Mölder (born 1977), Estonian curler and curling coach
- Raigo Mõlder (born 1982), Estonian rally co-driver
- Tõnis Mölder (born 1989), Estonian politician and government minister

== See also ==
- Mölders (disambiguation)
- Molder (disambiguation)
