= Muldaur =

Muldaur is a surname. Notable people with the name include:

- Diana Muldaur (born 1938), American television and film actress
- Geoff Muldaur (born 1943), American folk singer, guitarist, and composer
- Maria Muldaur (born 1943), American folk and blues singer

== See also ==
- Mulder (surname)
- Moulder (disambiguation)
- Molder (disambiguation)
