= Paul Smolders =

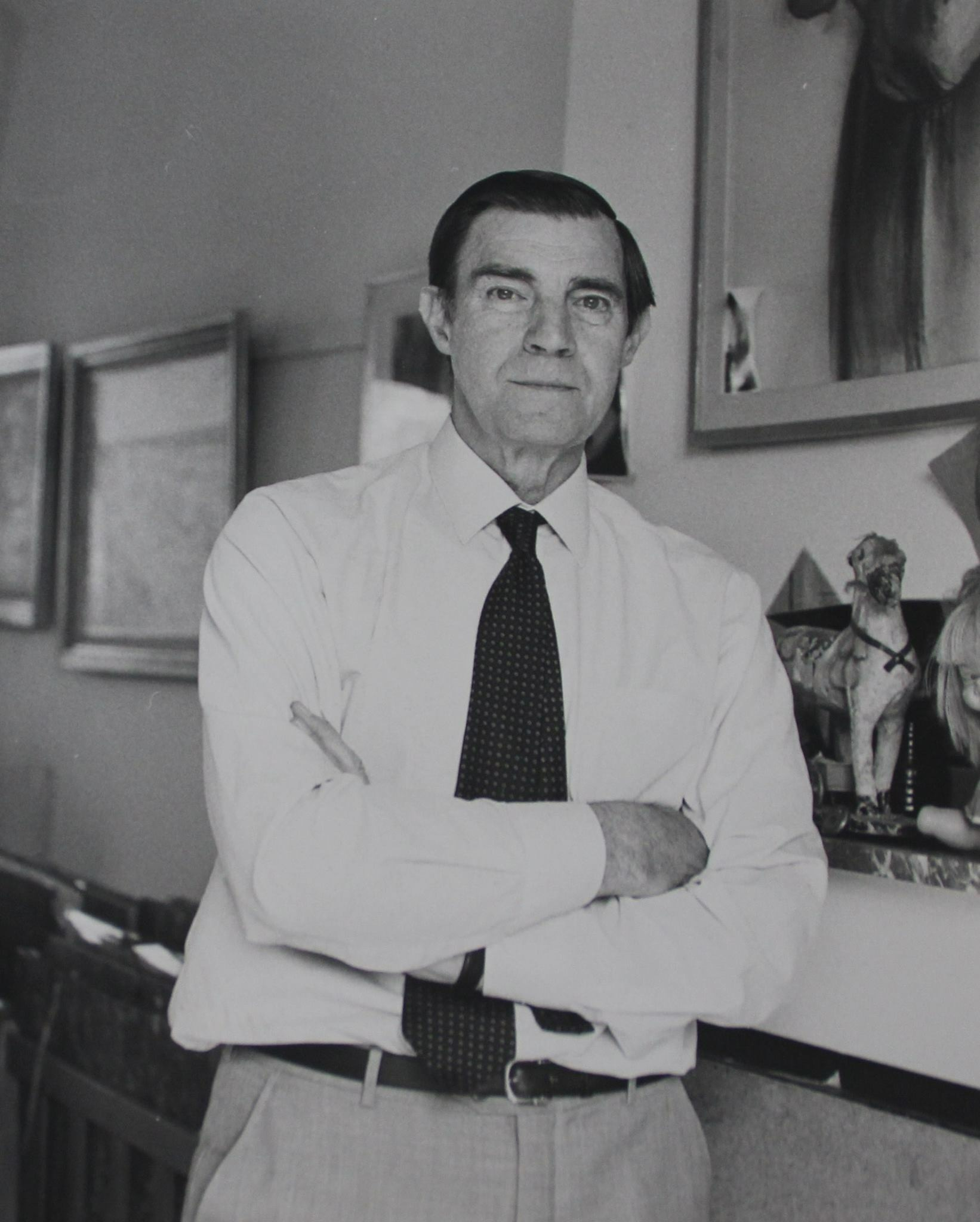
- A black and white photograph of Paul Smolders.
- Born: 7 August 1921; Oostmalle, Belgium
- Died: 10 April 1997 (aged 75); Berchem (Antwerp), Belgium
- Known for: Painter, Drawer
- Movement: Intimism
- Spouse: Frederika Van der Auweraert
- Website: http://www.paulsmolders.be

Paul Smolders (1921–1997) was an artist from a long Flemish tradition.

After obtaining the licentiate title Germanic languages, he signed up for an arts education at the Royal Academy of Fine Arts (Antwerp). Isidoor Opsomer, Julien Creytens and Albert Van Dyck became his teachers. He learned that behind the painting of the outer, whether it is a landscape or a model, a person and a soul are present.

Smolders was a supporter of the intimism style and had a preference for drawing and painting children, ballerinas, young women and terraces. Motherhood and landscapes are also recurring themes. His work has a dreamlike atmosphere but is not anecdotal. He made a lot of sketches and is described as 'an exceptionally clever draftsman'. "Drawing was essential to him and meant to be the spontaneous processing of his thinking." Smolders always remained faithful to his style. He was not an innovator but a passionate observer.

His work has been exhibited in Antwerp, Bruges, Brussels and Knokke, but also in The Hague, Rotterdam and New York.

In 1952 Smolders received the price Appel from the Committee for Artistic Operation. The Provincial Center Arenberg in Antwerp organized a tribute exhibition in 1991.
