= Fosteau Castle =

Château in Wallonia, Belgium

- Wallonia, Belgium
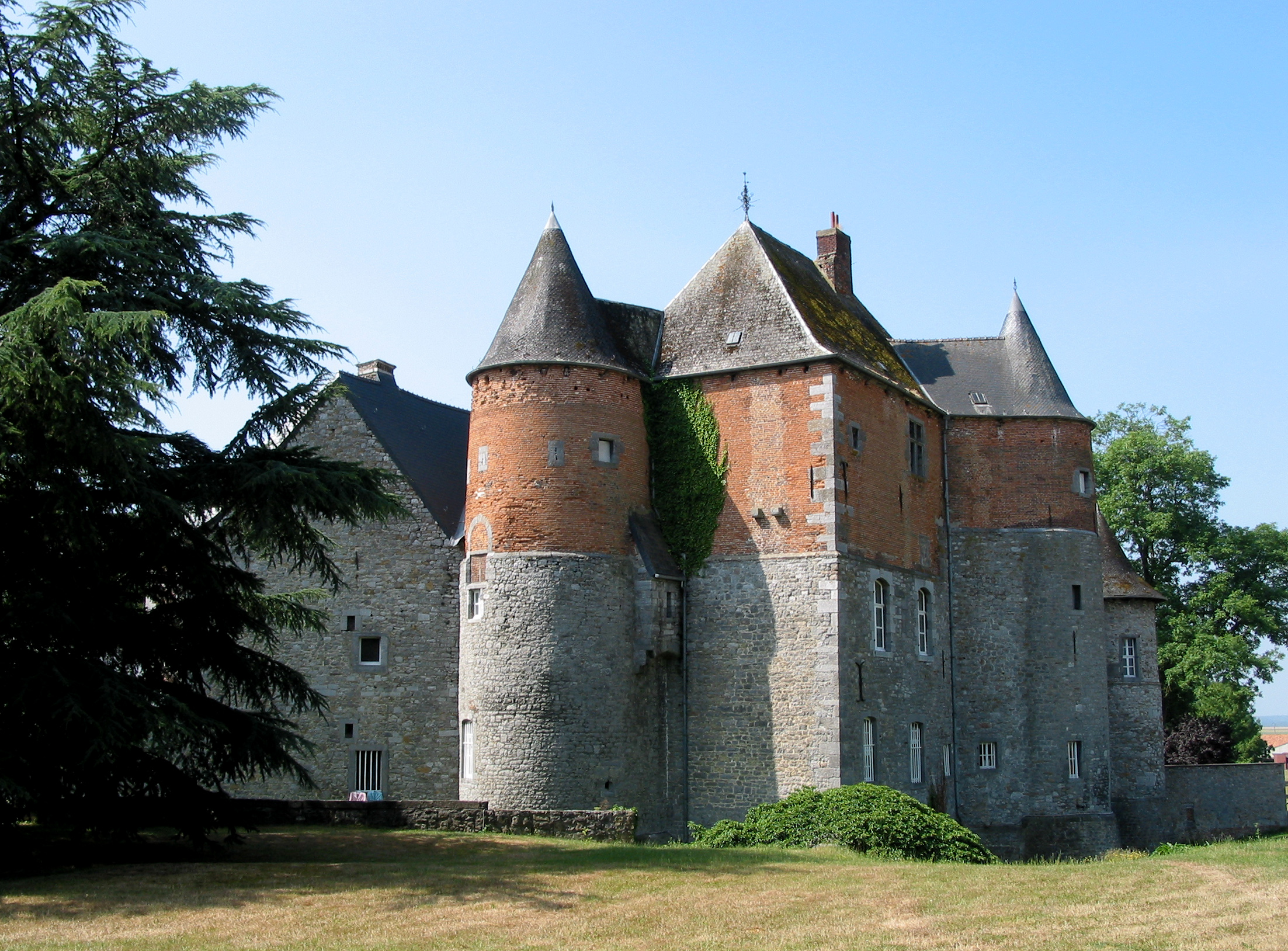

Site information
- Type: Castle

Location
- Coordinates: 50.3054°N 4.2517°E

Fosteau Castle (French: Château du Fosteau) is a castle in Leers-et-Fosteau in the municipality of Thuin, province of Hainaut, Wallonia, Belgium.

== History ==
The first castle at Fosteau was erected in the 14th century. In approximately 1380 Wauthier de Semousies became owner when Duchess Joan of Brabant gave it to him. His successors were the lords of Zwenne, de Marotte, de Henry and de Jamblines. They built several other buildings around the castle. The hall is Gothic.

The castle became a protected monument in 1979. Since 1980, it has housed an exhibition of antique furniture. Everything within the castle is also available for sale.

== See also ==
- List of castles in Belgium

== Sources ==
- Château du Fosteau official website
