= Mlinar =

Mlinar is a surname. Notable people with the surname include:

- Angelika Mlinar (born 1970), Austrian lawyer, businesswoman, and politician
- Antonio Delamea Mlinar (born 1991), Slovenian footballer
- Janez Mlinar (1941–2020), Slovenian cross-country skier
- Frano Mlinar (born 1992), Croatian footballer
