= TeNeues =

Defunct German publishing company

teNeues Publishing
- Founded: 1931
- Defunct: 2024
- Country of origin: Germany
- Headquarters location: Kempen, Lower Rhineland
- Key people: Hendrik teNeues †, Sebastian teNeues
- Publication types: Books
- Nonfiction topics: photography, design, lifestyle, and travel
- No. of employees: 130 worldwide
- Official website: teNeues Publishing Group

teNeues (pronounced "teh-noy-es") is a publishing company founded by Dr. Heinz teNeues in Krefeld, Germany, in 1931. It is a third-generation family firm and one of the leading book publishers in the areas of photography, design, lifestyle, and travel. teNeues publishes coffee table books (focusing on fashion, travel and interior design), illustrated calendars, and stationery products such as blank books and greeting cards.

== History ==
The firm was founded in 1931 as an offset printer by Dr. Heinz teNeues. The printing plant was destroyed in the Second World War and rebuilt in Kempen. With his son Manfred, Heinz teNeues set up the first publishing program, which consisted of art prints and school posters. In 1958, the first teNeues art calendar was published. At the end of the 1960s, greeting cards were added to the product range. In 1977, Dr. Manfred teNeues founded an independent teNeues publishing enterprise to separate it from the printing division.

In 1982, Manfred teNeues's eldest son Hendrik teNeues (1952–2019) founded the teNeues Publishing Company in New York, the company's first overseas office. Subsidiaries were later established in London and Paris. The company produces calendars, greetings cards, posters, and blank books. The company also marketed art books by European publishers in the U.S. market.

In 1995 the first teNeues book line was founded in New York City with an emphasis on photography. In the same year, Sebastian teNeues (younger brother of Hendrik teNeues) joined the publishing group. In 1999, Dr. Manfred teNeues moved over to the company's board of directors, whose president, Werner Klatten, is also managing director of the German Sports Council.

The corporation has a total of 130 employees as of 2010. It also operates retail stores in Düsseldorf, Hamburg, Cologne, and Munich. teNeues has over 200 licensing partners from a wide variety of areas, such as art, photography, comics, music, sports, and entertainment, serves over 70 countries through subsidiaries, commercial representatives, or partner firms.

== Products ==
The company publishes content for Heidi Klum, Michael Poliza, Russell James, Don Ed Hardy, and Porsche. teNeues produces a broad range of coffee table books spanning categories such as: animals, architecture, art, design, erotica, fashion, food, hotels, lifestyle, nature and ecology, photography, popular culture, restaurants, shops, Stern Fotografie and travel. teNeues also provides custom publishing for clients that include BMW, Porsche, Lufthansa, Henkel, Schwarzkopf, Cartier, Hasselblad, Chopard, Ferrari, Dior, and Swarovski.

teNeues publishes approximately 500 illustrated calendars annually on a wide variety of themes (e.g., nature calendars for National Geographic; art calendars that include Magritte and Keith Haring; comic calendars for Walt Disney; as well as on such stars as the Beatles and Tokio World).

teNeues also publishes illustrated titles on photography, design, lifestyle and travel. Approximately 60 books per year are marketed under the teNeues name, including such bestsellers as Eyes Over Africa, Cool Hotels, and Luxury Houses. Photographers work with teNeues, including Bruce Weber, Tim Walker, Russell James, Rankin, Elliot Erwitt, Martin Schoeller, Robert Mapplethorpe, Michael Poliza, Frank De Mulder and Matthew Rolston. In both 2007 and 2008, teNeues's illustrated titles received the Villégiature Prize (in the Best European Hotel Guide Category). In the same years, Michael Poliza and Tim Walker received the "German Photography Book Award" for their works with teNeues.

In 2007, teNeues was named "Brand of the Century" in the area of picture calendars.
