= Frank De Mulder =

Belgian photographer

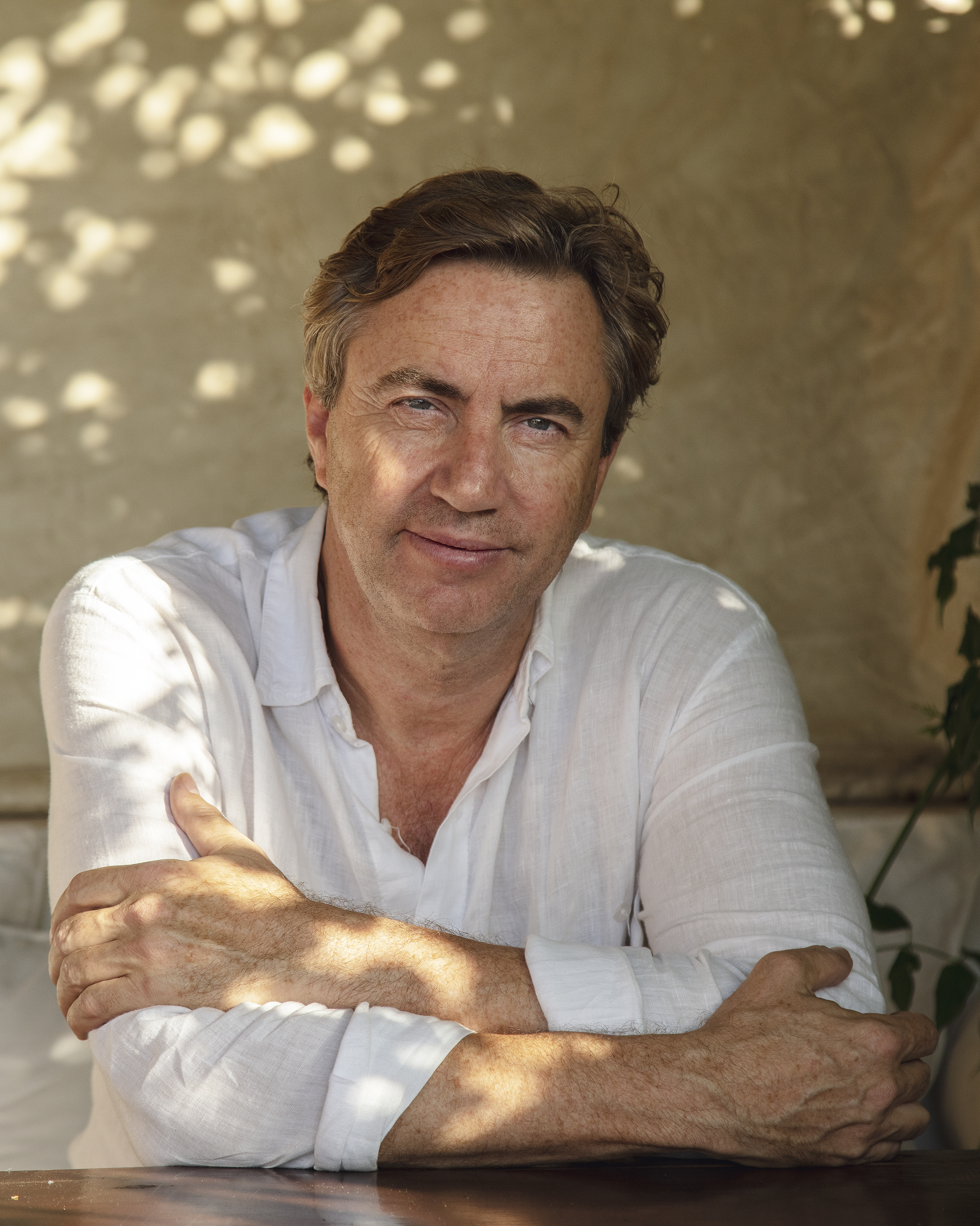
- Frank De Mulder
- Born: August 2, 1963 (age 62)
- Occupation: Photographer

Frank De Mulder (born 22 August 1963 in Ghent) is a Belgian photographer.

== Early life ==
He studied film direction at RITCS.

in Brussels and continued his studies in Ghent at KASK, where he graduated cum laude.

== Career ==
The leading Belgian Fine Art photographer Frank De Mulder is a celebrated personality within the international photo scene. He has worked for large advertising campaigns and well-known magazines, including Playboy, FHM, GQ, Maxim and Elle.

Frank De Mulder was born 22 August 1963 in Ghent, Belgium. Already as a young boy he was fascinated by image, light and beauty. He got his first camera from his father at the age of 12. At 17 he started to copy the pictures of David Hamilton, invested all his pocket money in photo equipment and learned by books the world of light and photography. He studied film direction at RITCS in Brussels and continued his studies in Ghent at the Royal Art Academy, where he graduated cum laude. Frank did his army service in the cinematography division where he made several “war movies” for military trainings.

He began his career as cameraman and director of photography in several short movies and commercials. At the age of 29 he decided photography was his passion. Since then, he worked his way up to become a worldwide celebrated photographer, represented by teNeues Publishers. His associate, Michèle van Damme, is often seen beside him. Michèle is responsible for art direction and digital post-production. Together they built, in total, 3 studios, the third one in Merelbeke near Ghent, Belgium.

With his nude portraits, the Belgian Frank de Mulder is considered the successor to the great Helmut Newton: his pictures contain a peculiar tension and tell small stories.

The Belgian Frank de Mulder is one of the best-known representatives of upscale erotic photography. His nude portraits move in the tradition of Helmut Newton: aesthetic, stylish pictures, mostly in black and white, which are not primarily concerned with serving the viewer's voyeurism. Rather, de Mulder creates a special atmosphere in each picture and gives the scenes a crackling tension. He expresses his concept as follows: "An erotic picture should tell a story. The viewer has to believe what he sees in the picture. If I achieve that, I will be successful."

Source: Stern

The publication of his first book « Senses » with teNeues publishers in 2007 was his breakthrough with the general public.

== Exhibitions ==
- 2006 - Eccentric, Knokke, Belgium - Frank De Mulder/Roger Raveel
- 2007 - Eccentric, Knokke, Belgium
- 2012 - Eccentric, Knokke, Belgium
- 2013 - Art depot, Bonheiden, Belgium
- 2013 - Art Gallery Ludwig Lefevere
- 2014 - Modernbook gallery, San Francisco, USA
- 2014 - Expo Hotel Stories in CODA Apeldoorn
- 2014 - Art Miami, Miami, USA
- 2014 - Gallerie Kronsbein, Munich, Germany
- 2014 - The Wilde Side Gallery, Antwerp, Belgium
- 2015 - Eccentric, Knokke, Belgium
- 2018 - Akademy, Kortrijk, Belgium

== Bibliography ==
- FotoArt, 1999, She, 80 pages 25x33cm, ISBN 90-76001-28-6
- teNeues, 2007, Senses, 168 pages 27.5x37cm, ISBN 978-3-8327-9208-4
- teNeues, 2010, Pure, 168 pages 27.5x37cm, ISBN 978-3-8327-9421-7
- teNeues, 2013, Glorious, 168 pages 28.7x37.6 cm, ISBN 978-3-8327-9730-0
- teNeues, 2015, Heaven, 168 pages 27.9 x 38.1 cm, ISBN 978-3-8327-3287-5
- teNeues, 2017, Tribute, 256 pages 29.8 x 38.1 cm, ISBN 978-3-9617-1038-6
