= Smulders =

Smulders is a Dutch occupational surname. It is a compression of "des mulders", meaning "the miller's son". Notable people with the surname include:

- Ans Smulders (born 1951), Dutch artistic gymnast
- August-Frans Smulders (1838–1908), shipbuilder
- Carl Smulders (1863–1934), Dutch composer, pianist and novelist
- Cobie Smulders (born 1982), Canadian actress
- Henri Smulders (1863–1933), Dutch sailor
- Karina Smulders (born 1980), Dutch actress
- Laura Smulders (born 1993), Dutch bicycle motocross racer
- Margriet Smulders (born 1955), Dutch photographer
- Marlies Smulders (born 1982), Dutch rower
- Silke Smulders (born 2001), Dutch professional racing cyclist
- Tim Benjamin Smulders (born 1985), Dutch EDM producer, half of Firebeatz
- Truus Smulders-Beliën (1902–1966), Dutch politician and teacher

== See also ==
- Smolders
