= Carmen Nicole Moelders =

American atmospheric scientist

- Born: Duisburg, Germany
- Education: University of Cologne (B.S., 1983; M.S., 1988; Ph.D., 1993), University of Leipzig (Habilitation, 1999)
- Known for: Hydrometeorology, Mesoscale meteorology, Land-atmosphere interactions, Cloud physics, Air pollution, wildfire modeling, and wind power modeling
- Awards: Scholarship by Blaise Pascal University, Clermont-Ferrand, France (1985), Habilitanden scholarship of the DFG (1996), Heisenberg Fellowship of the DFG for Physical Hydrology (1999), Extraordinary Performance Award for excellence in soil moisture research, by Geophysical Institute, UAF (2003), CNSM Outstanding Graduate Student Mentor and Advisor Award, UAF (2009)
- Scientific career
- Fields: Meteorology, Geophysics
- Workplaces: University of Alaska Fairbanks
- Doctoral advisor: Adolf Ebel

Carmen Nicole Moelders (publishing name Nicole Mölders) is an American atmospheric scientist. Her work is mainly focused on hydrometeorology, mesoscale meteorology, cloud physics, land-atmosphere interaction, air pollution, wildfire modeling, and wind power modeling.

== Background ==
Moelders earned a B.S. and a M.S, in Meteorology and a Ph.D. in Geophysics at University of Cologne, Germany, in 1983, 1988, and 1992, respectively. She earned a habilitation in meteorology at University of Leipzig, Germany, in 1999. From 1999 to 2001 she has served as a Heisenberg Fellow for Physical Hydrology. The Heisenberg Fellowship is a prestigious award conferred by the DFG (German Research Foundation). In 2001 she joined the Atmospheric Science Group of the Geophysical Institute and the Department of Atmospheric Sciences of the College of Natural Science and Mathematics at the University of Alaska Fairbanks (UAF) as an associate professor of atmospheric science. In 2006, she was promoted to full professor and became the first female full professor in the history of UAF's Geophysical Institute. She is the founding Chair of the Department of Atmospheric Sciences at UAF and has served from 2005 to 2013. Atmospheric Sciences is listed by the University of Alaska system as one of UAF's notable departments. Moelders is one of the two representatives of UAF at the University Corporation for Atmospheric Research (UCAR) and a member of both the UCAR President's Advisory Committee on University Relations (PACUR) and the Governance Task Group (GTG) of the UCAR Board of Trustees. Furthermore, she is the founding Editor-in-Chief and member of the Editorial Board of the Swiss journal Climate. She also serves as member of the Editorial Board of the Swiss journal Atmosphere and as member of the Series Advisory Board of SpringerBriefs in Climate Studies.

== Awards ==
- 1985 - Scholarship by Blaise Pascal University, Clermont-Ferrand, France
- 1996 - Habilitanden scholarship of the DFG
- 1999 - Heisenberg Fellowship of the DFG for Physical Hydrology
- 2003 - Extraordinary Performance Award for excellence in soil moisture research, by Geophysical Institute, UAF
- 2009 - CNSM Outstanding Graduate Student Mentor and Advisor Award, UAF

== Selected publications ==
Moelders has published more than 100 papers in peer-reviewed journals and two books.

=== Books ===
- Mölders, N., Kramm, G., 2014. Lectures in Meteorology. Springer, 591 pp.
- Mölders, N., 2011: Land-Use and Land-Cover Changes: Impact on Climate and Air Quality. Springer, 210 pp.

=== Papers ===
- Mölders, N., Fochesatto, J., Edwin, S.G., Kramm, G., 2019: Geothermal, oceanic, wildfire, meteorological and anthropogenic impacts on PM 2.5 concentrations in the Fairbanks Metropolitan Area. Open Journal of Air Pollution. Open Journal of Air Pollution, 8, 19-68.
- Mölders, N., Kramm, G., 2018: Climatology of Air Quality in Arctic Cities—Inventory and Assessment. Open Journal of Air Pollution, 7, 48-93.
- Kramm, G., Dlugi, R., Mölders, N., 2017: Using Earth's Moon as a testbed for quantifying the effect of the terrestrial atmosphere. Natural Science, 9, 251-288.
- Mölders, N., Khordakova, D., Dlugi, R., Kramm, G., 2016: Sustainability of wind energy under changing wind regimes — A case study. Atmospheric and Climate Sciences, 6, 158-173.
- Kramm, G., Sellhorst, G., Ross, H.K., Cooney, J., Dlugi, R., Mölders, N., 2016: On the maximum of wind power efficiency. Journal of Power and Energy Engineering, 4, 1-39.
- Mölders, N., Butwin, M.K., Madden, J.M., Tran, H.N.Q., Sassen, K., Kramm, G., 2015: Theoretical investigations on mapping mean distributions of particulate matter, inert, reactive, and secondary pollutants from wildfires by unmanned air vehicles (UAVs). Open Journal of Air Pollution, 4, 149-174.
- Mölders, N., Khordakova, D., Gende, S., Kramm, G., 2015: Uncertainty of wind power usage in complex terrain – a case study. Atmospheric and Climate Sciences, 5, 228-244.
- Mölders, N., Bruyère, C.L., Gende, S., Pirhalla, M.A., 2014: Assessment of the 2006-2012 climatological fields and mesoscale features from regional downscaling of CESM data by WRF-Chem over Southeast Alaska. Atmospheric and Climate Sciences, 4, 589-613.
- Mölders, N., 2013: Investigations on the impact of single direct and indirect, and multiple emission-control measures on cold-season near-surface PM2.5 concentrations in Fairbanks, Alaska. Atmos. Poll. Res., 4, 87-100, doi: 10.5094/APR.2013.009.
- Mölders, N., Tran, H.N.Q., Cahill, C.F., Leelasakultum, K., Tran, T.T., 2012: Assessment of WRF/Chem PM2.5-forecasts using mobile and fixed location data from the Fairbanks, Alaska winter 2008/09 field campaign. Atmos. Pol. Res., 3, doi: 10.5094/APR.2012.018.
- Mölders, N., Porter, S.E., Cahill, C.F., Grell, G.A., 2010: Influence of ship emissions on air quality and input of contaminants in southern Alaska National Parks and Wilderness Areas during the 2006 tourist season. Atmos. Environ., 44, 1400-1413.
- Mölders, N., Kramm, G., 2010. A case study on wintertime inversions in Interior Alaska with WRF. Atmos. Res., 95, 314-332,
- PaiMazumder, D., Miller, J., Li, Z., Walsh, J.E., Etringer, A., McCreight, J., Zhang, T., Mölders, N., 2008. Evaluation of Community Climate System Model soil temperatures using observations from Russia. Theor. Appl. Climatol., 94, 187-213.
- Mölders, N., 2008. Suitability of the Weather Research and Forecasting (WRF) model to predict the June 2005 fire weather for Interior Alaska. Weather Forecast., 23, 953-973.
- Li, Z., Mölders, N., 2008. Interaction of impacts of doubling CO2 and changing regional land-cover on evaporation, precipitation, and runoff at global and regional scales. Int. J. Climatol, 28, 1653–1679.
- Mölders, N., Kramm, G., 2007. Influence of wildfire induced land-cover changes on clouds and precipitation in Interior Alaska - A case study. Atmospheric Research, 84, 142-168.
- Narapusetty, B., Mölders, N., 2006. Evaluation of the soil module of HTSVS by observations and a theoretically advanced numerical scheme. Mon. Wea. Rev., 134, 2927-2942.
- Mölders, N., Walsh, J.E., 2004. Atmospheric response to soil-frost and snow in Alaska in March. Theor. Appl. Climat. 77, 77-105.
- Mölders, N., Haferkorn, U., Döring, J., Kramm, G., 2003. Long-term numerical investigations on the water budget quantities predicted by the hydro-thermodynamic soil vegetation scheme (HTSVS) - Part I: Description of the model and impact of long-wave radiation, roots, snow, and soil frost. Meteor. Atmos. Phys., 84, 115-135.
- Mölders, N., Rühaak, W., 2002. On the impact of explicitly predicted runoff on the simulated atmospheric response to small-scale land-use changes - An integrated modeling approach. Atmospheric Research, 63, 3-38.
- Mölders, N., 2001. On the uncertainty in mesoscale modeling caused by surface parameters. Meteor. Atmos. Phys., 76, 119-141.
- Mölders, N., 2000. Application of the principle of superposition to detect nonlinearity in the short-term atmospheric response to concurrent land-use changes associated with future landscapes. Meteor. Atmos. Phys., 72, 47-68.
- Mölders, N., 1999. On the atmospheric response to urbanization and open-pit mining under various geostrophic wind conditions. Meteor. Atmos. Phys., 71, 205-228.
- Mölders, N., 1998. Landscape changes over a region in East Germany and their impact upon the processes of its atmospheric water-cycle. Meteor. Atmos. Phys., 68, 79-98.
- Mölders, N., Raabe, A., 1997. Testing the effect of a two-way-coupling of a meteorological and a hydrologic model on the predicted local weather. Atmospheric Research, 45,81-108.
- Mölders, N., Raabe, A., Tetzlaff, G., 1996. A comparison of two strategies on land surface heterogeneity used in a mesoscale beta meteorological model. Tellus, 48A, 733-749.
- Mölders, N., Laube, M., Kramm, G., 1995. On the parameterization of ice microphysics in a mesoscale alpha weather forecast model. Atmospheric Research, 38, 207-235.
- Mölders, N., Hass, H., Jakobs, H.J., Laube, M., Ebel, A., 1994. Some effects of different cloud parameterizations in a mesoscale model and a chemistry transport model. J. Appl. Meteorol., 33, 527-545.

== Personal life ==
Moelders maintains a fashion blog High Latitude Style.
