= Stix =

Stix or STIX may refer to:

== People ==
- Stix Hooper (born 1938), American jazz musician
- Gary Stix, American journalist
- Thomas H. Stix (1924–2001), American physicist
- Christine Stix-Hackl (born 1957), Austrian jurist

== Arts and entertainment ==
- Stix (public art installation), a 2015 work by Christian Moeller
- STIX (video game), a Commodore 64 video game
- Stix, an animated stick character in the video game Bubba 'n' Stix
- The stiX, a British music project
- The Stix, a 2003 album by Jaga Jazzist

== Computing ==
- STIX Fonts project, providing mathematical symbols
- Structured Threat Information eXpression, a structured language for cyber threat intelligence

== Other uses ==
- Stix Baer & Fuller, an American department store chain (1892–1984)
- Stix, Baer and Fuller F.C., an American soccer club (1931–1934)
- Styx or Stix, a river in Greek mythology

== See also ==
- Sticks (disambiguation)
- Styx (disambiguation)
