= Michael Dertouzos =

Professor at the Massachusetts Institute of Technology

Michael Leonidas Dertouzos
- Μιχαήλ Λεωνίδας Δερτούζος
- Born: November 5, 1936; Athens, Greece
- Died: August 27, 2001 (aged 64); Boston, United States
- Occupation: Academic

Michael Leonidas Dertouzos (Greek: Μιχαήλ Λεωνίδας Δερτούζος; November 5, 1936 – August 27, 2001) was a professor in the department of Electrical Engineering and Computer Science at the Massachusetts Institute of Technology (MIT) and Director of the MIT Laboratory for Computer Science (LCS) from 1974 to 2001.

Dertouzos predicted the expansion of computer use very early, and was one of the pioneers in many areas of technology. These included his contributions to the Web particularly through his visionary approach to ubiquitous computing.

== Early life ==
Dertouzos was born in Athens, Greece. His father was an admiral in the Greek navy and the young Dertouzos often accompanied him aboard destroyers and submarines. This experience cultivated his interest in technology so that he learned Morse code, shipboard machinery, and mathematics at an early age. When he was 16, he came across Claude Shannon's work on information theory and MIT's attempt to build a mechanical mouse robot; these were said to have driven him to study in the university.

Dertouzos went to high school at Athens College. He came to the United States to study after the end of World War II and was awarded a Fulbright scholarship to study electrical engineering. Dertouzos completed his bachelor's and master's degrees at the University of Arkansas in 1957 and 1959. He earned his Ph.D. in electrical engineering from MIT in 1964.

== Career ==
After graduating, he immediately joined the faculty of MIT, where he stayed for the rest of his career. During Dertouzos's term, LCS innovated in a variety of areas, including RSA encryption, the spreadsheet, the NuBus, the X Window System, and the Internet. Dertouzos was instrumental in creating the World Wide Web Consortium and bringing it to MIT. He was a firm supporter of the GNU Project, Richard Stallman, and the FSF, and their continued presence at MIT. He was also the sponsor of Project Oxygen at MIT, which aimed to develop "pervasive, human-centered computing through a combination of specific user and system technologies".

In 1968, he co-founded Computek, Inc., a manufacturer of graphics and intelligent terminals, with Marvin C. Lewis and Dr. Huber Graham.

He died on August 27 2001 at Massachusetts General Hospital at the age of 64. He is buried at the First Cemetery of Athens.

== Honours ==
On November 5, 2018, Google recognized him with a doodle.

== Bibliography ==
- Dertouzos, The Unfinished Revolution: Human-Centered Computers and What They Can Do For Us, 2001, ISBN 0-06-662067-8.
- Dertouzos, What Will Be: How the New World of Information Will Change Our Lives, 1997, ISBN 0-06-251479-2.
- "Communications, Computers and Networks", in Scientific American Special Issue on Communications, Computers, and Networks, September, 1991
- (co-author), Made in America: Regaining the Productive Edge, 1989, ISBN 0-262-04100-6.
