= Moeller (disambiguation) =

Moeller is a surname.

Moeller may also refer to:

- Moeller High School, Cincinnati, Ohio, U.S.
- Moeller method, a percussive stroke method
