= Moeller =

Moeller and Möller are closely related (Note: The distinction between the two first-syllable vowels is in some contexts treated by most speakers of German as merely one of typography, rather than of spelling: for instance if a medium lacks both ö and the ability to overtype o with ", then "Well, what else can you do?", but substitute oe where ö belongs. Nevertheless, in proper names of at least living persons, conforming to the person's or family's practice is considered at least a significant matter of courtesy.)) surnames of German origin.

People bearing one of them include the following:

== People ==
- Adolph Moeller, American politician
- Alfred Alphonse Moeller (1889–1971), governor of Orientale Province in the Belgian Congo from 1926 to 1933
- Andreas Möller (born 1967), German footballer
- Andy Moeller, American football coach
- Arthur Moeller van den Bruck
- Birger Moeller-Pedersen
- Brian Moehler, major league baseball player
- Chad Moeller, major league baseball player
- Charles Moeller (historian)
- Christian Moeller
- Christopher Moeller
- Dennis Moeller, major league baseball player
- Edmund Moeller (disambiguation), multiple people
- Emil Moeller
- Gary Moeller (1941–2022), American football coach
- Gustave Moeller, American painter
- Heinz F. Moeller, German zoologist
- Henry K. Moeller
- Jacques-Nicolas Moeller, philosopher
- James Moeller
- Jean Moeller, Belgian historian
- Jim Moeller
- Joe Moeller, major league baseball player
- Johnny Moeller
- Jorgen Moeller, Danish chess player
- Louis Moeller, American genre painter
- Robert T. Moeller
- Ron Moeller, major league baseball player
- Sanford A. Moeller, Moeller drum method author
- Therald Moeller, American chemist
- Walter H. Moeller

== See also ==
- Moller, surname
