= Communications, Computers, and Networks =

Special issue of Scientififc American magazine

- Discipline: Communications; Computers; Networks
- Language: English

Publication details
- History: September, 1991
- Publisher: Scientific American, Inc. (USA)

Standard abbreviations
- ISO 4: Commun. Comput. Netw.

The Scientific American special issue on Communications, Computers, and Networks is a special issue of Scientific American dedicated to articles concerning impending changes to the Internet in the period prior to the expansion and mainstreaming of the World Wide Web via Mosaic and Netscape. This issue contained essays by a number of important computer science and internet pioneers. It bore the promotional cover title Scientific American presents the September 1991 Single Copy Issue: Communications, Computers, and Networks.

== Reviews ==
University of California, Berkeley's September 1991 online journal, "Current Cites" commented: "Scientific American Special Issue on Communications, Computers and Networks 265(3) (September 1991): If you purchase a single issue of a magazine this year, this should be it. Filled with eleven articles by some of the biggest names in computer networking, this issue covers all bases and includes suggestions for further readings on the issues." In addition, a 4 September 1991 post to the University of Houston's "Computer System's Forum" also recommends the issue, stating: "These articles cover enough ground that I would recommend the issue to people getting ready to dive into the Internet or understand what is happening in networks these days." An additional post to this same forum on 21 August 1991 comments: "The authors are exceptional, including Mitch Kapor, Mark Weiser, Nicholas Negroponte, Alan Kay, Al Gore, and many others. An excellent issue."

== Response ==
Of this issue, the Electronic Frontier Foundation stated in the article "Scientific American's September Issue to be Sent to All EFF Members" in its September 1991 newsletter:

This month's Scientific American ("Communications, Computers, and Networks") must surely represent the most complete collection of articles and commentary on all aspects of networking to date. As such we feel strongly that it should be made available to as many people as possible. Because of this, we have purchased a large number of copies of this issue that we will be using for various purposes over the coming year. The first use will be to deliver a free copy of to all our members. We are expecting the magazines to be delivered to us at the end of next week and they will go out to our members soon after. We realize that many of our members may already have a copy of their own, but if so we trust that they will use this extra copy to educate and enlighten someone else to the issues and potential of networking.

== Table of contents ==
- Gary Stix: "Profile: Information Theorist David A. Huffman"
- Michael Dertouzos: "Communications, Computers and Networks"
- Vint Cerf: "Networks"
- Larry Tesler: "Networked Computing in the 1990s"
- Mark Weiser: "The Computer for the 21st Century"
- Nicholas Negroponte: "Products and Services for Computer Networks"
- Lee Sproull and Sara Kiesler: "Computers, Networks and Work"
- Thomas W. Malone and John F. Rockart: "Computers, Networks and the Corporation"
- Alan Kay: "Computers, Networks and Education"

Computers, Networks and Public Policy

- Al Gore: "Infrastructure for the Global Village"
- Anne W. Branscomb: "Common Law for the Electronic Frontier"
- Mitch Kapor: "Civil Liberties in Cyberspace"

== See also ==
- History of the Internet
