= Unfinished Revolution =

Unfinished Revolution may refer to:

- The Unfinished Revolution, technology book
- Unfinished Revolution (album), album by Christy Moore
