= Edmund Moeller =

Edmund Moeller may refer to:

- Edmund Moeller (sculptor) (1885–1958), German sculptor
- Edmund Moeller (sport shooter) (born 1934), American sports shooter
