= Stix (public art installation) =

Public art installation in Nashville, Tennessee, United States

Coordinates: 36°9′17″N 86°46′46″W

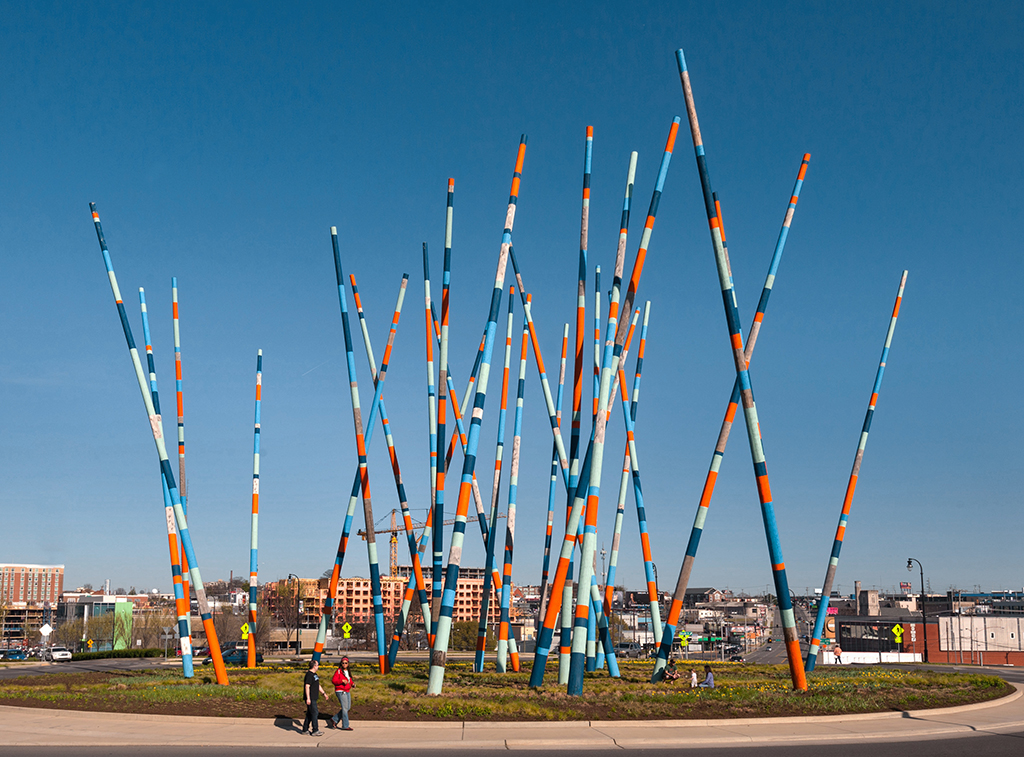
- The public art installation in 2016
- Artist: Christian Moeller
- Year: 2015
- Location: Nashville, Tennessee, United States

Stix is a public art installation or sculpture at Korean Veterans Boulevard and 8th Avenue in Nashville, Tennessee. It was designed by Christian Moeller, and erroneously reported to be an homage to the Native Americans who owned the land prior to European settlers. "Actually, that was not my original intent. The only reference to Native American art I made was showing an image of a beautiful totem pole at an early stage of the project development. I did this in order to give an example of how the colors I proposed to use would contrast with the grayish, silver patina that the wooden poles would develop over time," said Moeller. Its construction cost $750,000, making it the "most expensive" public art installation in Nashville. According to Nashville Public Radio, its cost and name turned it into "a magnet for skepticism" prior to its dedication in 2015. In March 2018, a car crashed into the installation.

The original design called for 35 poles standing 85 feet high and each pole tip was to be covered with a custom-made “LED lightcap” to emit a light glow at nighttime. The design was later revised to reduce the number to 27 poles at a height of 70 feet tall and to eliminate the lightcaps.
