= Christian Moeller =

- Born: Frankfurt am Main, Germany
- Known for: Media Art, Public Art

Christian Moeller (born December 2, 1959) is a sculpture and installation artist, professor and Chair of the Department of Design Media Arts at University of California, Los Angeles UCLA He was born in Frankfurt am Main, Germany where he lived and worked until moving to the United States in 2001. His interactive work has been shown at museums, galleries and art festivals internationally. Many more recent works can be seen as urban scale objects and installations in public spaces.

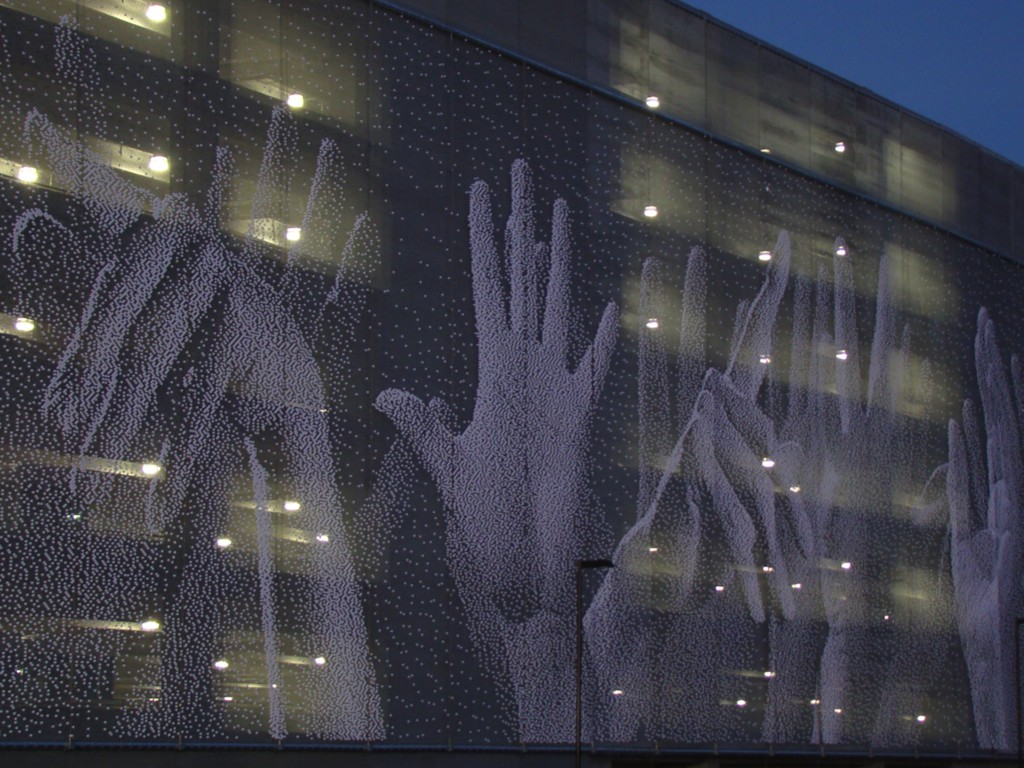
Hands, by Christian Moeller - Mineta San José International Airport, California.

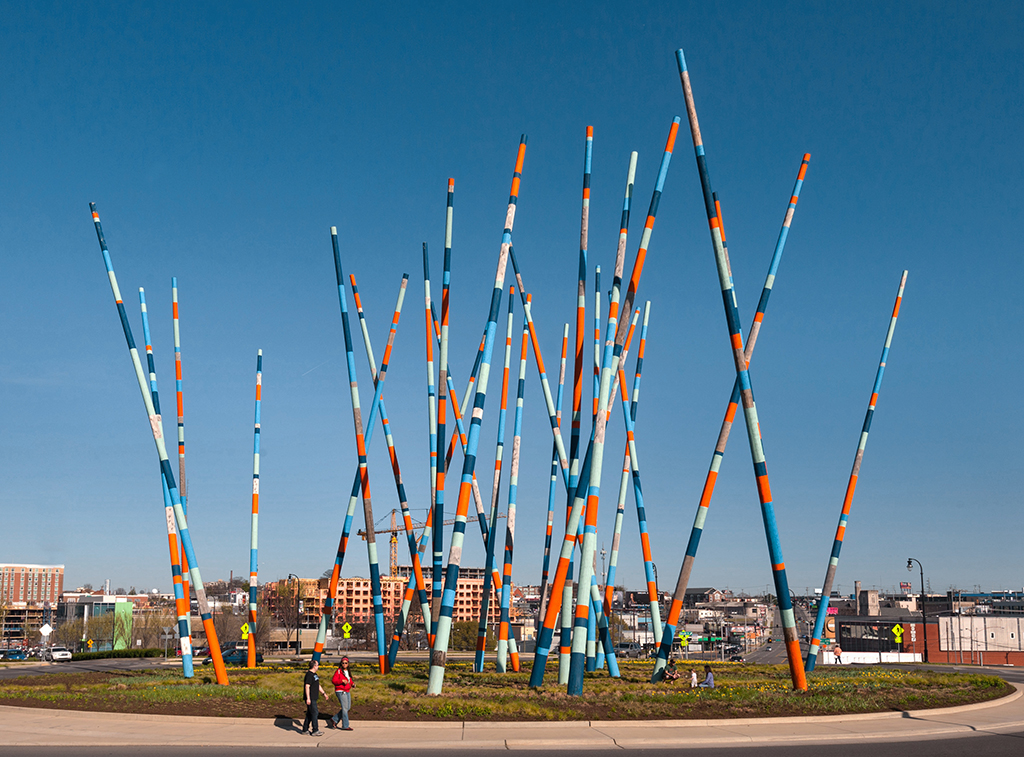
Stix in Nashville, Tennessee.

== Early life and education ==
Growing up in Frankfurt, Moeller received his first professional education in a construction company where he trained as a draftsman in structural engineering. At age nineteen, he took a job opportunity in West Africa working for a railway construction project producing topographic and geological maps in Booué, a small village on the banks of the Ogooué river in central Gabon.

Following his return to Germany in 1981, Moeller studied architecture at the College of Applied Sciences in Frankfurt and under Gustav Peichl at the Academy of Fine Arts in Vienna. While working at the architecture firm Günther Behnisch in Stuttgart, he began his transition into the arts, joining the Institute for New Media in the Städelschule, Frankfurt under Peter Weibel in 1990.

== Work ==
Moeller first gained widespread recognition working with electronic media technologies to produce innovative and intense physical events. His media installations ranged from handheld objects to architectural scale installations. Many of his works throughout the 1990s interrogated and explored the synergies between architecture, sound, technology, and moving images. A pioneer in this field, he created novel works like the media facade “Kinetic Light Sculpture” in 1992 in collaboration with the architect Rüdiger Kramm and the interactive dance piece “Electro Clips” with Stephen Galloway, the principal dancer at William Forsythe’s Ballet Frankfurt at the time.

Moeller taught as a professor at the State College of Design in Karlsruhe, Germany until moving to the United States in 2001. Currently, he is professor in the UCLA department of Design Media Arts and operates his studio in the Elysian Valley (Frogtown) neighborhood of Los Angeles, California. Over the past two decades, Moeller’s work has been increasingly focused on the field of public art where he usually works with metal or composites. Many of his works have become iconic landmarks such as “Stix” in Nashville, Tennessee and “Hands” in San Jose, California.

== Selected works ==
- Kinetic Light Sculpture, Frankfurt, 1992
- Electro Clips, at the Theater am Turm (TAT), Frankfurt, 1994
- Audio Grove, Spiral Art Center, Tokyo, 1997
- Virtual Cage, Tochoji Auditorium P3, Tokyo, Japan, 1997
- The Voice of the People, at Schirn Kunsthalle, Frankfurt, 1998
- Cheese, Pasadena, California, 2003
- Do Not Touch, London, United Kingdom, 2004
- Nosy, Tokyo, Japan, 2007
- Mojo, San Pedro, California 2007
- Daisy, Singapore, 2008
- Hands, San Jose, California, 2010
- Stix, Nashville, Tennessee, 2015
- Trio, Calgary, Alberta, 2018
- Loops, Charlotte, North Carolina, 2019
