= The Unfinished Revolution =

2001 book by Michael Dertouzos

- First edition
- Author: Michael Dertouzos
- Genre: non-fiction
- Publisher: HarperCollins
- Publication date: 2001
- Pages: 224
- ISBN: 0-06-662067-8
- OCLC: 00-059767
- Dewey Decimal: 004'.01'9 -- dc21
- LC Class: QA76.9.H85 D46 2001

The Unfinished Revolution is a 2001 book by Michael Dertouzos that proposes why and how technology should be made to work for humans. It goes on to state that until this goal has been met the computer revolution is 'unfinished'.

== Summary ==
In the foreword to the paperback edition, written by Tim Berners-Lee shortly after Michael Dertouzos's death, he succinctly summarizes the objectives of the book by stating the three areas he believes computers still need improvement in: "helping us to communicate better with each other, by helping with the actual processing of data, and by being less of a pain in the process." More specifically, the book breaks this down into five buckets that need special attention and improvement:

1. Natural Interaction
2. Automation
3. Individualized Information Access
4. Collaboration
5. Customization

=== Natural interaction ===
Dertouzos argues that since humans are not born with keyboard and mouse inputs to interact with the world why should we be expected to interact with computers in such a fashion. Instead he states that computers should engage us through our existing five senses and goes on to mostly focus on examples for vision and hearing. His primary focus for providing input to computer systems lies in proposals within the speech recognition area but he also emphasizes the need to simplify software interface systems, while warning against reducing them down to an unreasonably small number of options (such as a car only being able to accelerate or turn right).
