= Heinz Friedrich Moeller =

German zoologist with a focus on Australian marsupials

Heinz Friedrich Moeller (born 1936 in Berlin; died 2009) was a German zoologist and university lecturer.

Moeller studied biology and earth sciences, specialising in palaeontology, which took him to the universities of Freiburg, Tübingen and Kiel. He gained practical experience in the field of zoology through work placements at the zoos in Frankfurt am Main, Basel and Zurich. Following the completion of his doctoral studies in Kiel and subsequent habilitation in Erlangen, he assumed a position at the Ruprecht Karls University of Heidelberg in 1976.

In Heidelberg, he took over as head of the Department of Vertebrate Morphology at the Zoological Institute and of the Zoological Museum in 1976.

Moeller’s scientific work focused on Australian marsupials. Among other things, Moeller conducted extensive research into the thylacine (Thylacinus cynocephalus). In his book "Der Beutelwolf", published in 1997, he comprehensively summarised, for the first time in German, the global knowledge on this extinct species. The work is still regarded today as the definitive overview of the state of research at that time. Moeller, along with his friend Dr. Eric R. Guiler, was recognized as a leading international authority on the thylacine.

Moeller retired in 2001. In 2002, Heinz F. Moeller was awarded the Order of Merit of the Federal Republic of Germany (the ‘Federal Cross of Merit’) in recognition of his contribution to zoology. According to an account of the award ceremony, Heidelberg’s Lord Mayor Beate Weber paid tribute to Moeller, describing him as a “treasure” for the faculty, the university and the city.
