= Project Oxygen =

MIT computing research project

Project Oxygen is a research project at the Massachusetts Institute of Technology's Computer Science and Artificial Intelligence Laboratory to develop pervasive, human-centered computing. The Oxygen architecture is to consist of handheld terminals, computers embedded in the environment, and dynamically configured networks which connect these devices. A Project Oxygen device, the H21, exhibits similarities to the iPhone. As of 2021, Project Oxygen devices have never been officially used in wider society.
