= Gary Stix =

Gary Stix is a journalist and author. He was a Senior Editor at Scientific American who retired in 2025.

== Education ==
Stix obtained his undergraduate degree in journalism from New York University.

== Personal ==
He is married to Miriam Lacob.

== Career ==
Stix was a senior editor for Scientific American and worked there for nearly 35 years. He most recently was responsible for covering neuroscience. During his time at the magazine, he was frequently the editor for special issues and sections of the magazine. One of those issues on the topic of time received a National Magazine Award. He also reported and commissioned articles on a variety of other topics ranging from nanotechnology to obesity. Prior to working for Scientific American, Stix spent 3 years as a science journalist at IEEE Spectrum. He and his wife wrote a general primer on technology called "Who Gives a Gigabyte?"

== Bibliography ==
=== Articles ===
- Stix, Gary (November 1993). "Turning Green : can industrial chemistry trade benzene for sugar?". Scientific American. 269 (5): 78–81. doi:10.1038/scientificamerican1193-104.
- — (November 1993). "ECM for 747s: Should Commercial Airliners Carry High-Tech Protection?". Scientific American. 269 (5): 82–83. doi:10.1038/scientificamerican1193-109.
- — (February 1994). "Science and Business: Dr. Big Brother". Scientific American. 270 (2): 79–80. doi:10.1038/scientificamerican0294-108.
- — (February 1994). "Science and Business: Extra! Extra! Newspaper Publishers Reinvade Cyberspace". Scientific American. 270 (2): 80–81.
- — (February 1994). "Science and Business: Pipe Dream: A Consortium Considers Remaking the Automobile". Scientific American. 270 (2): 83–84.
- — (February 1994). "Science and Business: A Blade of Grass". Scientific American. 270 (2): 84. doi:10.1038/scientificamerican0294-114.
- — (December 1994). "Bad Apple Picker: Can a Neural Network Help Find Problem Cops?". Scientific American. 271 (6): 25–26. doi:10.1038/scientificamerican1294-44.
- — (December 1994). "The Speed of Write". Scientific American. 271 (6): 72–77. doi:10.1038/scientificamerican1294-106.
- — (June 2010). "Alzheimer's : forestalling the darkness". Scientific American. 302 (6): 33–39. Bibcode:2010SciAm.302f..50S. doi:10.1038/scientificamerican0610-50. PMID 20521480.
- — (September 2010). "Social Analgesics". Scientific American. 303 (3): 22–23. Bibcode:2010SciAm.303c..22S. doi:10.1038/scientificamerican0910-22 (inactive 12 July 2025). PMID 20812469.
- — (March 22, 2011). "One pill makes you smarter: The myths of the meat machine". Scientific American.
- — (February 9, 2012). "Alzheimer's Disease Symptoms Reversed in Mice : A cancer drug given to mice eliminates brain-damaging proteins, leading to improved cognition within days, but will it work in humans?". Scientific American.
- — "Wiki-Curious: Are you a 'busybody,' a 'hunter" or a 'dancer'?", Scientific American, vol. 332, no. 2 (February 2025), p. 18. "'Curiosity actually works by connecting pieces of information, not just acquiring them.'"
- – "Thinking without Words: Cognition doesn't require language, it turns out" (interview with Evelina Fedorenko, a cognitive neuroscientist at the Massachusetts Institute of Technology), Scientific American, vol. 332, no. 3 (March 2025), pp. 86–88. "[I]n the tradition of linguist Noam Chomsky... we use language for thinking: to think is why language evolved in our species. [However, evidence that thought and language are separate systems is found, for example, by] looking at deficits in different abilities – for instance, in people with brain damage... who have impairments in language – some form of aphasia [ – yet are clearly able to think]." (p. 87.) Conversely, "large language models such as GPT-2... do language very well [but t]hey're not so good at thinking, which... nicely align[s] with the idea that the language system by itself is not what makes you think." (p. 88.)
