= Molnár =

Origin
- Region of origin: Hungary

Other names
- Variant form: Molnar

Molnár (or Molnar) is a Hungarian surname meaning "miller". The name may be a loanword from Old Germanic (with the same meaning), which is also the same in Slavic, Russian/Belarusian/Ukrainian(млынар) Czech/Slovak(mlynár) Polish(młynarz) and also same in Finno-Ugric, Finnish/Estonian(miller) Hungarian(molnár); however, it is most likely derived from an ancient steppe language which would explain why it's found in every Indo-European and Finno-Ugric language.

The word itself shares a common ancestry with numerous similar surnames across Europe, such as the Dutch Molenaar, the Italian Molinari, the Danish and Norwegian Møller, and the Spanish Molinero, all meaning “miller”.

Molnár was the name of one of Hungary’s most iconic playwrights, Ferenc Molnár (1878-1952).

Other people with the name include:

- Ádin Molnár (born 2004), Hungarian footballer
- Albert Szenczi Molnár (1574–1634), Hungarian Calvinist pastor, linguist, philosopher, poet, religious writer and translator
- Antal Molnár (born 1969), Hungarian historian
- Antal Molnár (musicologist) (1890–1983), Hungarian musicologist
- Balázs Molnár (born 1977), Hungarian footballer
- Charles Molnar (1935–1996), American electrical engineer and computer developer
- Charley Molnar (born 1961), American football coach
- C. Pál Molnár/Pál C. Molnár (1894–1981); hu:Molnár C. Pál
- Chris Molnar (born 1987), American writer, editor and publisher
- Chrissy Molnar, Canadian wheelchair curler
- Csilla Molnár (1969–1986), Hungarian beauty queen
- Endre Molnár (born 1945), Hungarian water polo player
- Erika Molnar (born 1976), Hungarian athlete
- Farkas Molnár (1897–1945), Hungarian architect, painter, essayist, and graphic artist.
- Ferenc Molnár (disambiguation)
  - Ferenc Molnár (born Ferenc Neumann 1878–1952), Hungarian American writer
  - Ferenc Molnár (footballer) (1891–?), football player and manager
  - Ferenc Molnár (athlete) (1904–?), Hungarian athlete
  - Ferenc Zoltán Molnár (1943–1967), American soldier and Medal of Honor recipient
  - Ferenc Molnár (singer) (born 1982), known professionally as “Caramel”; winner of the second series of Megasztár
- Fritz M. de Molnár (fl. 20c), Hungarian scout commissioner
- George Molnar (1910–1998), Australian cartoonist
- George Molnar (philosopher) (1934–1999), Australian
- Gergely Molnár (born 1950), Hungarian; hu:Molnár Gergely
- Géza Molnár (1923–2011), Hungarian writer; hu:Molnár Géza
- György Molnár (1901–1977), Hungarian footballer
- Imre Lakatos (known as Imre Molnár for a time), philosopher
- Ingo Molnár, Hungarian hacker
- István Molnár (1913–1983), Hungarian water polo player
- István Molnár (chemist) (born 1950), chemist and translator hu:Molnár István (műfordító)
- József Molnár (1821–1899), Hungarian painter
- József Molnár (1918–2009), Hungarian writer
- Marie-Claude Molnar (born 1983), Canadian Paralympic athlete
- Miklos Molnar (born 1970), Danish football player
- Mónika Molnar (hu:Mónika Molnár)
- Martin Molnár (born 2008), Hungarian racing driver
- Pavol Molnár (1936–2021), Slovak football player
- Péter Molnár (disambiguation)
  - Péter Molnár (academic), Hungarian academic and politician
  - Péter Molnár (footballer) (born 1983), Slovak football player
  - Peter Molnar (geophysicist), geological scientist
  - Péter Molnár (canoeist) (born 1986), Hungarian canoeist
- Rajmund Molnár (born 2002), Hungarian footballer
- Ralph E. Molnar, Australian paleontologist and curator
- Steve Molnar (1947–2021), Canadian football player
- Tamás Molnár (born 1975), Hungarian water polo player
- Thomas Molnar (1921–2010), Catholic philosopher, historian and political theorist
- Tibor Molnár (1921–1982), Hungarian film actor
- Vera Molnár (1924–2023), Hungarian artist
- Zoltán Molnár (footballer, born 1971), Hungarian footballer
- Zoltán Molnár (footballer, born 1973), Hungarian footballer
- Zoltán Molnár (rower) (born 1961), Hungarian rower
