= Miller (surname) =

Family name

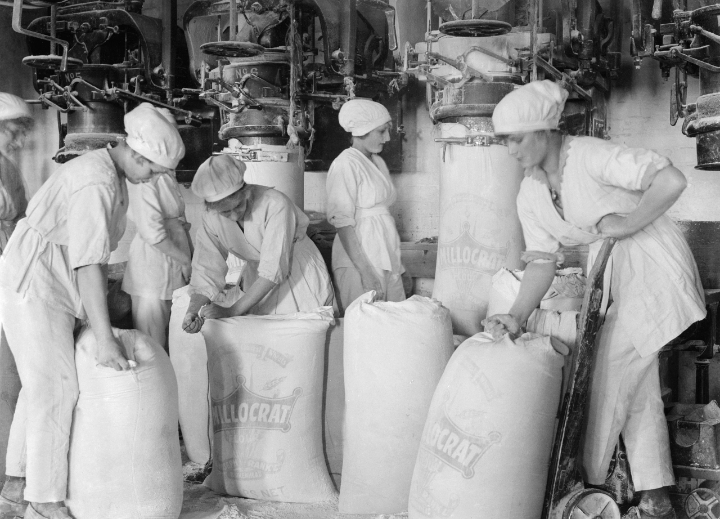
- Millers in WWI

Origin
- Meaning: Miller
- Region of origin: United Kingdom (England or Scotland); other European countries, including Germany and Switzerland (when anglicized from Müller, Meller, Mueller)

Other names
- Variant forms: Müller, Meller, Mueller

Miller and Millar are surnames of English, German, Irish, Scottish or Yiddish origin.

Miller is a common surname in: the United States (where it is the 7th most common surname), Bahamas (14th), Falkland Islands (17th), Cayman Islands and Canada (18th), Jamaica (22nd), Scotland (24th), New Zealand (36th) and Australia (38th).

== History ==
There are two homonymous forms of Miller, one that began as an occupational surname for a miller and another that began as a toponymic surname for people from a locale in Glasgow. Miller of the occupational origin may also be translated from many cognate surnames from other European languages, such as Mueller, Müller, Mühler, Moller, Möller, Møller, Myller, and others. There is also a form in the early English linguistics as Milleiir.

The standard modern word represents the northern Middle English term, an agent derivative of mille 'mill', reinforced by Old Norse mylnari (see Milner). In southern, western, and central England, Millward (literally, 'mill keeper') was the usual term.

The name Miller also has a history in Northern Ireland, notably County Antrim where many migrants from Northern England and Scotland settled in the 17th century Ulster plantations.

In 2020, Miller was the 24th most common surname on the birth, death and marriage registers in Scotland; Millar is 75th.

== In the United States ==
According to the 2010 U.S. Census, Miller was the 7th most common surname in the United States, the number of occurrences was 1,161,437.

In 2007, about 1 in every 25 Americans were named Smith, Johnson, Williams, Brown, Jones, Miller or Davis. Miller was the seventh most common surname.

The surname Miller in the United States can also be the result of anglicization of:

- surnames of German origin as Müller, "Mueller", "Moeller", "Muller", all of which are cognates of Miller
- surnames from other European languages, for example: French - Meunier, Dutch - Molenaar, Mulder and Smulders, Danish - Møller, Italian - Molin, Molinaro and Molinari, Spanish - Molinero or Molino (= mill), Romanian - Moraru, Hungarian - Molnár, Slavic - Mlinar, Mlinarić or Melnik, Greek - Mylonas (Μυλωνάς) etc.

Miller is also the third most common surname among Jews in the United States (after Cohen and Levy), from the Yiddish cognate of Müller, which would be Miller (מיללער) or Milner (מילנער).

Miller is also the most common surname in the Amish, originating from Müller in Switzerland.

== See also ==
- List of most popular surnames
