= Moller =

see also Müller

Moller, Möller, Møller or von Möller is a surname. 'Möller' means 'Miller'. Notable people with the surname include:

- Adolf Möller (1877–1968), German rower
- Aksel Møller (1906–1958), Danish politician
- Ale Möller, Swedish musician and composer
- Alex Möller, German politician
- Andreas Möller, German footballer
- Axel Möller, Swedish astronomer
- Baldur Möller, Icelandic chess master
- Carl Møller, Danish rower
- Chris Moller (businessman), New Zealand businessman and sports administrator
- Chris Moller (architect), New Zealand architect
- Christian Moeller, German artist and architect born 1959
- Christian Möller, German artist and painter born 1963
- Christian Møller, Danish chemist and physicist 1904–1980
- Daniel Wilhelm Moller (1642–1712), Hungarian-German historian and philosopher
- David Möller, German sportsman
- Edvard Möller, Swedish athlete
- Egon Möller-Nielsen, Danish-Swedish architect and sculptor
- Erik Möller, German freelance journalist
- Faron Moller, Canadian-born British computer scientist
- Frank Möller, German judo sportsman
- Frank Möller (athlete), German sprinter
- Frans Möller (disambiguation)
- Gustav Möller, Swedish politician
- Gustav Möller (athlete), Swedish athlete
- Hans Hartvig-Møller, Rector (1909–1943) of Gammel Hellerup Gymnasium
- Hans Møller Gasmann, Norwegian educator
- Hermann Möller, Danish linguist
- Irmgard Möller, German former Red Army Faction militant
- Ivan Möller, Swedish athlete
- Jan Möller, Swedish footballer
- Joost Möller, Dutch politician
- Julia Möller (born 1949), Uruguayan television presenter and model
- Karl Leopold von Möller, Austrian politician and writer
- Klaus Peter Möller (1937–2022), German politician
- Lillian Moller Gilbreth American psychologist & industrial engineer
- Lorraine Moller, New Zealand former athlete
- M. P. Moller, pipe organ builder
- Marc Møller, Danish former footballer
- Martin Moller, German poet
- Mike Moller, Canadian former ice hockey player
- Myra Moller, New Zealand cyclist
- Nina van Pallandt (née Møller), Danish actress and singer
- Ola Möller (born 1983), Swedish politician
- Olof Möller, Swedish science fiction author
- Orla Møller, Danish priest and politician
- Oscar Möller, Swedish ice hockey player
- Paul Moller, engineer
  - Moller Skycar
- Per Möller Jensen Swedish former bandmember: The Haunted
- Poul Møller (1919–1997), Danish politician
- Ralf Möller, German actor and ex-bodybuilder
- Randy Moller, Canadian former professional ice hockey player
- Rene Moller (1946–1994), Danish footballer
- Robert Moeller, Deputy Commander of Military Operations, US Africa Command
- Roland Møller, Danish actor
- Sandra Möller, German sprinter
- Sebastian Möller, German expert for voice technology
- Shona Moller, New Zealand artist
- Siemtje Möller (born 1983), German politician
- Silke Möller, German athlete
- Stefan Möller (born 1975), German politician
- Steffen Möller, German teacher, actor, satirist and stand-up artist
- Susan Moller Okin, New Zealand liberal feminist, political philosopher and author
- Thomas Möller, Swedish criminal and ex-president of Hells Angels Sweden
- Tommy Möller Swedish political science professor at Stockholm University
- William Bruhn-Möller, Swedish rower

== Other ==
- A. P. Moller-Maersk Group

== See also ==
- Møller, surname
- Moeller, surname
- Moler (surname)
