= Møller =

Møller (pronounced [ˈmølˀɐ]) is a Danish surname, referring to an occupation as a Miller, equivalent of the Scottish/English Miller, the German Müller etc. Møller is the twentieth commonest surname in Denmark. It is the most common non-patronymic surname.

Danish immigrants to English-speaking countries often anglicized the name to Miller, Moller, or Moeller.

Notable people with the name includes:

- Anders Møller Christensen (born 1977), Danish footballer
- Anna Emilie Møller (born 1997), Danish athlete
- Arnold Peter Møller (1876–1965), Danish shipping magnate and founder of the A.P. Moller-Maersk Group
- Arvid Møller (1939–2020), Norwegian journalist and non-fiction writer
- Birger Møller-Pedersen (born 1949), computer scientist and professor
- Cæsar Peter Møller Boeck (1845–1917), Norwegian dermatologist
- Carl Møller (1887–1948), Danish rower
- Carl Christian Møller (1823–1893), Danish concertmaster and composer
- Casper Møller, Danish professional Counter-Strike player
- Christian Møller (1904–1980), Danish physicist
- Christian Frederik Møller (known as C. F. Møller, 1898 - 1988), Danish architect and founder of C. F. Møller Architects
- Erik Møller (1909–2002), Danish architect
- Grethe Fenger Møller (born 1941), Danish politician
- Gunner Møller Pedersen (born 1943), Danish composer
- Hans Peter Christian Møller (1810–1845), Danish malacologist and Inspector of North Greenland
- Ida Møller (1872–1947), Danish operatic soprano
- Jens Peter Møller (1783–1854), Danish painter
- Jens Reno Møller (born 1971), Danish racing driver
- Johan Møller Warmedal (1914–1988), Norwegian politician
- John Christmas Møller (1894–1948), Danish politician
- Katti Anker Møller (1868–1945), Norwegian feminist
- Kenneth Heiner-Møller (born 1971), Danish football manager
- Kenneth Møller Pedersen (born 1973), Danish footballer
- Knud Albert Möller (1919–1993), Finnish (of Danish parents) radio correspondent
- Lis Møller (1918–1983), Danish journalist and politician
- M. P. Moller (1854–1937), Danish pipe-organ builder and businessman
- Mærsk Mc-Kinney Møller (1913–2012), Danish shipping magnate
- Marc Møller (born 1986), Danish footballer
- Michael Møller (born 1952), Danish diplomat, Director-General of United Nations Office at Geneva (2013–2019)
- Niels Otto Møller (1897–1966), Danish sailor
- Per Stig Møller (born 1942), Danish politician, Foreign Minister (2001–2010)
- Peder Møller (disambiguation), several people
- Peter Møller (born 1972), Danish former professional footballer
- Pia Christmas-Møller (born 1961), Danish politician
- Poul Martin Møller (1794–1838), Danish professor of philosophy and author
- Richard Møller Nielsen (1937–2014), Danish football player and manager
- Sunniva Hakestad Møller (1907–1995), Norwegian politician
