= Miske (disambiguation) =

Miske is a village in Bács-Kiskun county in southern Hungary.

Miske may also refer to the following articles:

== People ==
- Ahmed Baba Miské, Mauritanian writer, diplomat and politician
- Billy Miske (1894–1924), American professional boxer
- Georg Miske (1928–2009), German Olympic Weightlifter
- László Miske (1935–2025), Hungarian actor

== Other uses ==
- Miske (drink), an Ecuadorean alcoholic beverage
