= Crotona Theatre =

Coordinates: 40°50′50.62″N 73°53′54.83″W

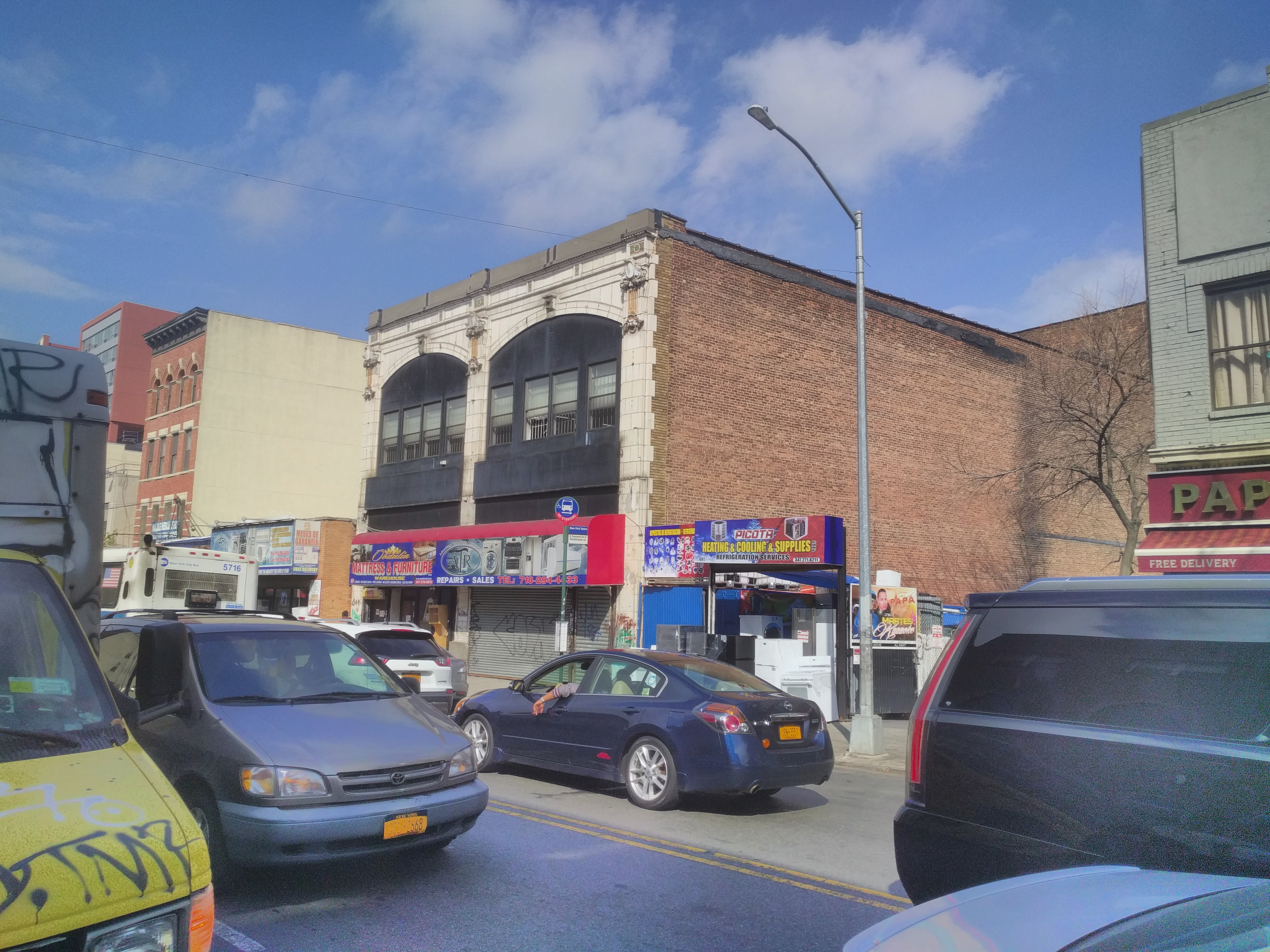
Crotona Theatre 2018

Crotona Theatre at 453 East Tremont Avenue, in Bronx, New York opened in 1912 showing vaudeville. It had 2,210 seats and was one of William Fox’s first large theaters. Designed by Thomas W. Lamb, it had a Beaux Arts auditorium wainscotted in marble and red tapestry covering the walls. Movie showings were added and in the silent era a twelve-piece orchestra and a three manual Moller pipe organ (Op. 216) provided accompaniment. It closed in 1959 and became a factory/warehouse.

The theater is pictured during a street view scene near the beginning of the 1958 movie The Colossus of New York.
