= Péter Molnár =

Péter Molnár may refer to:

- Péter Molnár (academic), Hungarian academic and former politician
- Péter Molnár (footballer) (born 1983), football goalkeeper from Slovakia for BFC Siófok
- Peter Molnar (geophysicist) (1943–2022), professor in geological sciences
- Péter Molnár (canoeist) (born 1986), Olympic Hungarian canoeist
