= Ferenc Molnár (disambiguation) =

Ferenc Molnár (1878–1952) was a Hungarian dramatist and novelist.

Ferenc Molnár may also refer to:

- Ferenc Molnár (athlete) (1904–?), Hungarian Olympic athlete
- Ferenc Molnár (footballer) (1891–?), football player and later manager in Italy
- Ferenc Molnár (singer) (born 1982), known professionally as Caramel, winner of the second series of Megasztár
- Ferenc A. Molnár (born 1942), Hungarian linguist
- Ferenc Kalman Molnár (1923–2006), Hungarian nazi, post-war migrant to Australia
- Ferenc Zoltán Molnár (1943–1967), U.S. Army soldier and Medal of Honor recipient
