= Christian Moller =

Christian Moller may refer to:

- Christian Möller, German artist and painter
- Christian Moeller, German-American sculpture and installation artist and academic
- Christian Møller, Danish chemist and physicist
