= Fidesz =

Fidesz – Hungarian Civic Alliance Fidesz – Magyar Polgári Szövetség
- President: Viktor Orbán
- Vice presidents: See list: János Bóka; Kinga Gál; Alpár Gyopáros; Bálint Kreicsi
- Parliamentary leader: János Bóka
- Founders: See list: Viktor Orbán; Gábor Fodor; László Kövér; István Bajkai; Zsolt Bayer; Tamás Deutsch; Zsolt Németh; József Szájer
- Founded: 30 March 1988; 38 years ago
- Headquarters: Visi Imre utca 6, 1089, Budapest
- Think tank: Foundation for a Civic Hungary
- Youth wing: Fidelitas
- Ideology: Orbanism; Illiberalism; National conservatism; Right-wing populism; Christian nationalism
- Political position: Right-wing to far-right
- National affiliation: Fidesz–KDNP (since 2005)
- European affiliation: Patriots.eu (since 2024) (Note: The party was formerly part of the European People's Party (2009–2021) and were non-affiliated (2021–2024).)
- European Parliament group: Patriots for Europe (since 2024) (Note: The party was formerly part of the European People's Party Group (2009–2021) and were Non-Inscrits (2021–2024).)
- International affiliation: Centrist Democrat International
- Colours: Orange
- National Assembly: 44 / 199
- European Parliament: 10 / 21
- County Assemblies: 227 / 381
- General Assembly of Budapest: 10 / 33

Party flag

Website
- fidesz.hu

Fidesz – Hungarian Civic Alliance (Note: Hungarian: Fidesz – Magyar Polgári Szövetség [ˈfidɛs ˈmɒɟɒr ˈpolɡaːri ˈsøvɛt͡ʃːeːɡ]) is a political party in Hungary led by Viktor Orbán. It is most notable for dominating Hungarian politics from 2010 to 2026, a period known as the Orbán era. Earlier, from 1998 to 2002, it was the senior partner in a conservative coalition government. Founded as a classical liberal party, Fidesz gradually moved to the right and is presently considered a right-wing or far-right party. Its ideology, referred to as Orbanism, includes national conservatism, Christian nationalism, right-wing populism, authoritarianism and illiberalism. It is Eurosceptic in foreign policy.

Fidesz was established in 1988 as the Alliance of Young Democrats (Fiatal Demokraták Szövetsége, shortened to Fidesz), a centre-left and liberal activist student movement opposed to state communism. During Hungary's transition to multiparty democracy (Hungarian: rendszerváltás) in 1989-90, the movement became a political party and entered the National Assembly with Orbán at its helm after the 1990 election. Fidesz emerged as the largest parliamentary party after the 1998 election. During this period, it adopted nationalism and saw its popularity stagnate due to corruption scandals. While in opposition between 2002 and 2010, Fidesz formed an electoral alliance with the Christian Democratic People's Party (KDNP), which would eventually become its satellite party.

After winning a parliamentary supermajority in the 2010 election, Fidesz pursued national-conservative, Christian-nationalist, and Eurosceptic policies. Using its supermajority, it promulgated a new constitution, the Fundamental Law, in 2011, which further consolidated its power. In the following decade, Hungary experienced democratic backsliding as Fidesz developed a governance strategy of clientelism and institutional capture called the "System of National Cooperation" (Hungarian: Nemzeti Együttműködés Rendszere or NER). Despite popular dissatisfaction with NER corruption, Fidesz won supermajority victories in the 2014, 2018, and 2022 parliamentary elections while adopting new themes, including anti-immigrant rhetoric during the 2015 migrant crisis and Russophilic rhetoric after Russia's 2022 invasion of Ukraine. Fidesz lost the 2026 election to the centre-right Tisza Party.

Fidesz currently enjoys majorities in all 19 county assemblies and endorsed every successful presidential candidate from 2000 to 2024. It is in opposition in the National Assembly and the General Assembly of Budapest. Reflecting its shifting political position, Fidesz was, until 2000, a member of the Liberal International; from 2000 to 2021, of the centre-right European People's Party; and from 2024 onwards, of Patriots for Europe, a right-wing populist formation it founded with ANO 2011 and the Freedom Party of Austria. Fidesz's governance and political communication strategies have exercised a strong influence on right-wing European politics and on conservatism in the United States, especially after the Republican Party's shift toward Trumpism in the late 2010s.

== History ==
=== 1988–1989: Liberal activist beginnings ===
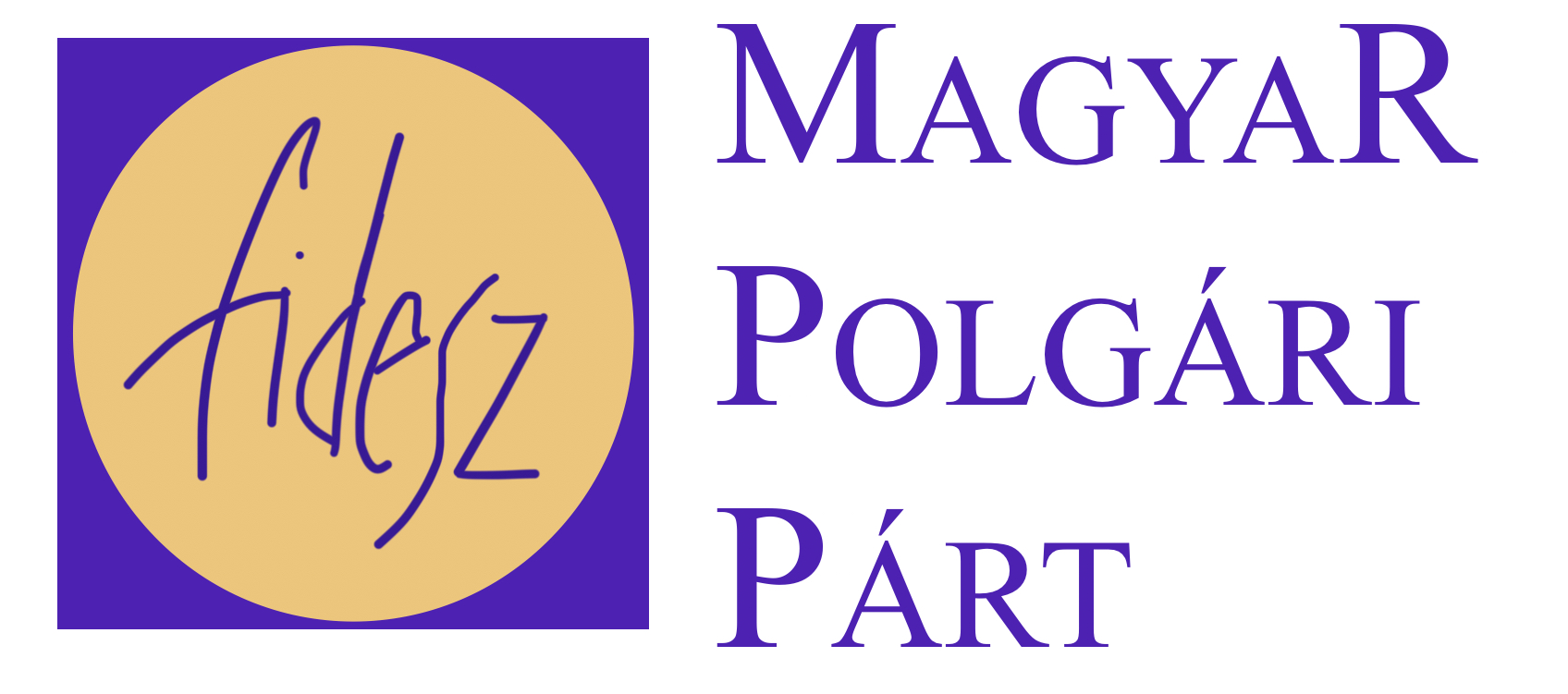
First logo of the party (1998)

The party was founded in the spring of 1988 and named Fiatal Demokraták Szövetsége (Alliance of Young Democrats), with the acronym FIDESZ. It grew out of an underground liberal student activist movement opposed to the ruling Hungarian Socialist Workers' Party. Founding such a movement was semi-illegal at the time, so the founders risked their careers by being involved in the opposition. The membership had an upper age limit of 35 years (this requirement was abolished at the 1993 party congress).

In 1989, Fidesz won the Thorolf Rafto Memorial Prize. The movement was represented at the award ceremony by one of its leaders, Péter Molnár, who later became a Member of Parliament in Hungary.

=== 1990–1998: Centre-left opposition and conservative turn ===
In the 1990 elections, the party entered the National Assembly after winning about 6% of the vote. They became a small, though quite popular oppositional party. In 1992, Fidesz joined the Liberal International. At the time, it was a moderate liberal centrist party, sometimes also described as social-liberal. By April 1993, Fidesz had "consistently led opinion polls for the past two years".

At the party congress that year, it changed its political position from liberal to civic-centrist ("polgári centrumpárt"). The turn in ideology caused a severe split in the membership. Péter Molnár left the party along with Gábor Fodor and Klára Ungár, who joined the liberal Alliance of Free Democrats. Viktor Orbán was elected party chairman.

After its disappointing result in the 1994 elections, Fidesz remained an opposition party but grew increasingly conservative. In 1995, it changed its name to Hungarian Civic Party (Magyar Polgári Párt) and sought connections to the national-conservative Hungarian Democratic Forum, a former governing party.

=== 1998–2002: First Orbán government ===
Fidesz gained power for the first time at the 1998 elections, with Viktor Orbán becoming prime minister. Their coalition partners were the smaller Hungarian Democratic Forum and the Independent Smallholders' Party. In 2000, Fidesz terminated its membership in the Liberal International and joined the European People's Party. The first Fidesz-led government was reckoned as a "relatively conventional European conservative" government.

=== 2002–2010: Return to opposition ===
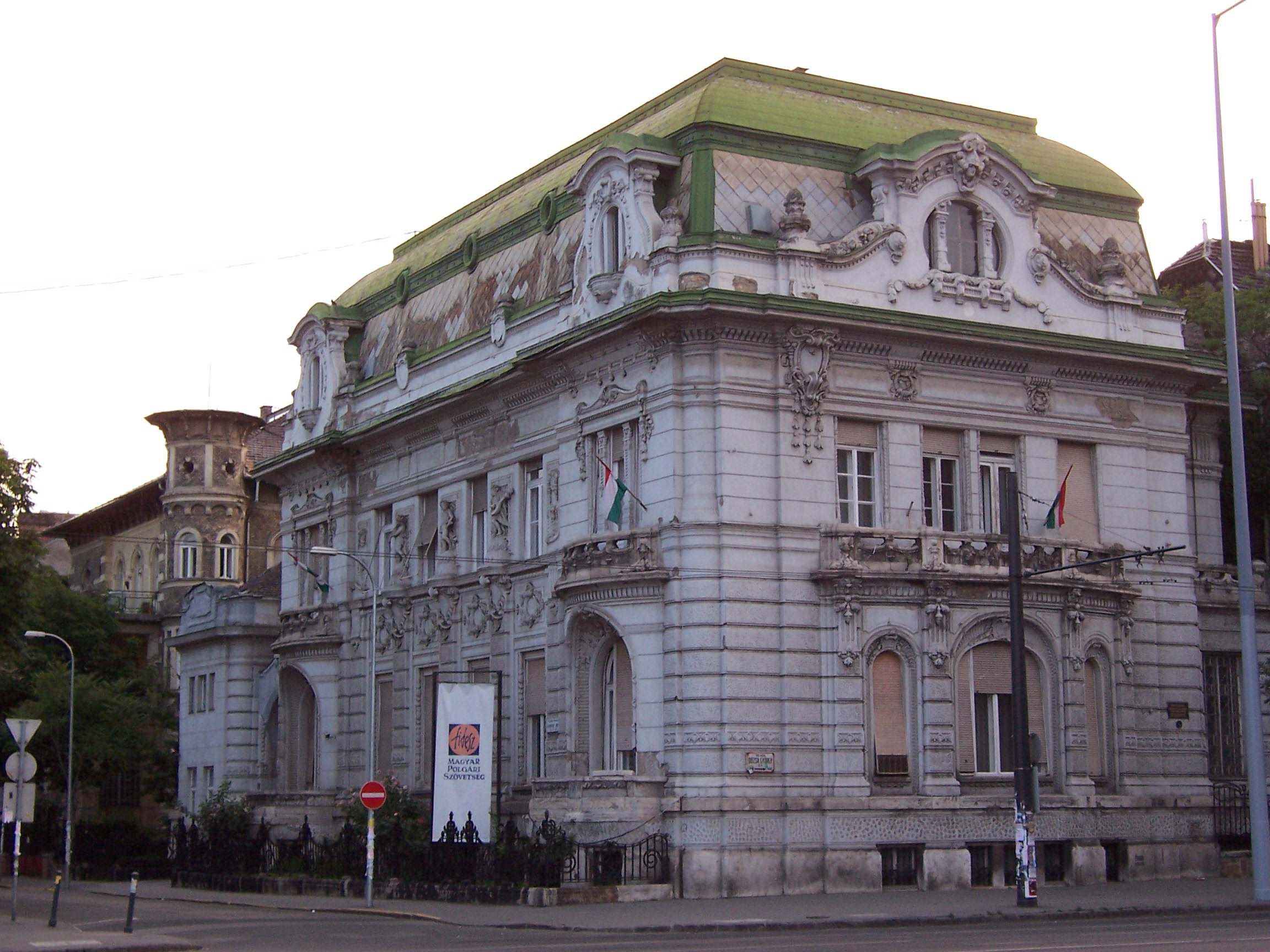
The former main office building of Fidesz

Fidesz narrowly lost the 2002 elections to the Hungarian Socialist Party, garnering 41.07% to the Socialists' 42.05%. Fidesz had 169 members of the National Assembly, out of a total of 386. Immediately after the election, they accused the opponents of electoral fraud. The 2002 Hungarian municipal elections saw again huge Fidesz losses.

In the spring of 2003, Fidesz took its current name, Fidesz – Hungarian Civic Union.

It was the most successful party in the 2004 European Parliamentary Elections: it won 47.4% of the vote and 12 of its candidates were elected as Members of the European Parliament (MEPs), including Lívia Járóka, the second Romani MEP.

Fidesz's nominee, Dr. László Sólyom, was elected President of Hungary in the 2005 election. He was endorsed by Védegylet, an NGO including people from the whole political spectrum. A self-described "conservative liberal," he championed elements of both political wings with a selective, but conscious choice of values.

In 2005, Fidesz and the Christian Democratic People's Party (KDNP) formed an alliance for the 2006 elections, which were won by the social-democratic and liberal coalition of Hungarian Socialist Party (MSZP) and the Alliance of Free Democrats (SZDSZ). Fidesz received 42% of the list votes and 164 of 386 representatives in the National Assembly.

On 1 October 2006, Fidesz won the municipal elections, which counterbalanced the MSZP-led government's power to some extent. Fidesz won 15 of 23 mayoralties in Hungary's largest cities—although its candidate narrowly lost the city of Budapest to a member of the SZDSZ—and majorities in 18 out of 20 regional assemblies.

In the 2009 European Parliament election, Fidesz won a landslide victory, gaining 56.36% of the vote and 14 of Hungary's 22 seats.

In a closed-door party meeting in 2009, Orbán called for a "central political forcefield" to govern Hungary for up to 20 years to achieve political stability.

In January 2010, László Kövér, head of the party's national board, told reporters the party was aiming at winning a two-thirds majority at the parliamentary elections in April. He noted that Fidesz had a realistic chance to win a landslide. However, this feat was threatened by the rise of the radical nationalist Jobbik party. Kövér said it was a "lamentably negative" tendency, adding that it was rooted in the "disaster government" of the Socialist Party and its former liberal ally Free Democrats.

=== 2010–2026: In power ===
The strong and preeminent Fidesz has benefited from the fragmented and disjointed opposition that proved inept at mounting a unified challenge to the ruling party in a country where a majority of parliamentary seats are allocated to the party that garners the plurality of votes in a constituency.

Government debt fell by 6% in the 8 years after Fidesz took power in 2010 while the country's credit ratings improved. Economic growth almost quadrupled with wages rising by over 10% and destitution decreasing by almost 50% (though still considerable). According to official figures, unemployment had fallen by nearly two-thirds. However, as many as almost half of newly employed Hungarians found work elsewhere in the EU. A public works program has also been criticized by some economists for artificially and deceptively reducing unemployment numbers while engaging in and compensating people for possibly unneeded or unnecessarily inefficient work. Hungary has been highly dependent on EU funds during Fidesz's rule; these representing nearly 4% of the country's GDP, more than for any other EU member.

==== 2010–2014: Second Orbán government ====
In a landslide victory in the 2010 parliamentary elections, the party won an outright majority in the first round on 11 April, with the Fidesz-KDNP alliance winning 206 seats, including 119 individual seats. In the final result, Fidesz 263 seats, of which 173 are individual seats. Fidesz held 227 of these seats, giving it an outright majority in the National Assembly by itself.

Fidesz was widely seen as propelled to a sweeping victory in large part due to the dissatisfaction with the ruling political establishment which was plagued by corruption scandals and by the 2008 financial crisis. The socialist government had also imposed harsh austerity measures in an attempt to rein in its ballooning budget deficits even before the late 2000s’ crisis. In September 2006, a recording of the prime minister admitting to lying about the country's dire economic prospects was revealed by the media and broadcast on radio. Steel barriers were erected around the parliament to protect it from tens of thousands of protesters.

After winning 53% of the popular vote in the first round of the 2010 parliamentary election, which translated into a supermajority of 68% of parliamentary seats, giving Fidesz sufficient power to revise or replace the constitution, the party embarked on an extraordinary project of passing over 200 laws and drafting and adopting a new constitution—since followed by nearly 2000 amendments.

The new constitution has been widely criticized by the European Commission for Democracy through Law, the Council of Europe, the European Parliament and the United States for concentrating too much power in the hands of the ruling party, for limiting oversight of the new constitution by the Constitutional Court of Hungary, and for removing democratic checks and balances in various areas, including the ordinary judiciary, supervision of elections, and the media.

In October 2013, Thorbjørn Jagland, Secretary General of the Council of Europe said that the council was satisfied with the amendments which had been made to the criticized laws.

==== 2014–2018: Third Orbán government ====
Fidesz won the nationwide parliamentary election in April 2014 and secured a second supermajority with 133 seats (of 199) in the legislature. Observers from The Organization for Security and Co-operation in Europe stated that Fidesz "enjoyed an undue advantage, including in biased media coverage.”

This supermajority was lost, however, when Tibor Navracsics was appointed to the European Commission. His Veszprém County seat was taken by an independent candidate in a by-election. Another by-election on 12 April 2015 saw the supermajority lose a second seat, also in Veszprém, to a Jobbik candidate.

==== 2018–2022: Fourth Orbán government ====
Fidesz won the nationwide parliamentary election in April 2018 and secured a 3rd supermajority with 133 seats (of 199) in the legislature. Orbán and Fidesz campaigned primarily on the issues of immigration and foreign meddling, and the election was seen as a victory for right-wing populism in Europe.

With the start of 2019, the prime minister's residence was relocated from the Hungarian Parliament Building to the Buda Castle, a former Carmelite monastery and former royal residence. The move was first planned in 2002 during the first Fidesz government, but was never carried out. Government representatives stated the move was necessary to uphold the separation of the executive and legislative branch by physically separating the two (in contrast to the Communist era when the two branches operated in the same building) while the opposition criticized the move as profligate (the renovation cost Ft21bn, or €65.5M) and as a symbolic revival of the Horthy era (Miklós Horthy also took up residence in the building).

In 2019 local elections, the party lost its majority in General Assembly of Budapest and numerous city councils.

==== 2022–2026: Fifth Orbán government ====
Fidesz won the 2022 Hungarian parliamentary election and secured a supermajority for the fourth time with 135 seats (of 199) in the legislature. With 54.13% of the popular vote, Fidesz received the highest vote share by any party since Hungary returned to democracy in 1989.

In June 2024 it was revealed that Fidesz had become Google's biggest advertiser in the whole of the European Union.

=== 2026–present: Return to opposition ===
Fidesz sought a fifth term at the 2026 election. At that election, Fidesz was resoundingly defeated by the Tisza Party, led by former Fidesz member Péter Magyar. Fidesz lost over 15%p of its vote from 2022, while its seat count was more than halved, to 52 seats. Most polling by pro-Fidesz outlets projected a fifth consecutive term for Orbán, while independent pollsters universally projected a Tisza win. Orbán did not take up his seat in Parliament. Gergely Gulyás became the leader of Fidesz's parliamentary group. He resigned from that post in July and was replaced by János Bóka, citing the 17th Amendment to the Fundamental Law. The amendment bars MPs from future elections who have reached the 12 year term limit, affecting most Fidesz–KDNP MPs. Former Foreign Minister Péter Szijjártó resigned his seat, saying he received "a highly prestigious offer" from the Chinese company BYD. In November 2026, as part of the wider investigations into alleged corruption and bribery during Orbán's tenure, Hungarian authorities uncovered $19.5m of cash hidden and buried in various remote locations related to ex-cabinet minister Miklós Seszták. On 17 November 2026, Fidesz altered the orange colour scheme used on their social media logos to a grey design, describing the update as a "technical change". However, the original logo was kept on the party's website. Fidesz's press officer Bertalan Havasi denied a permanent rebranding of the party, while Prime Minister Péter Magyar remarked that "Fidesz has finally figured out the reason for their April defeat".

== Ideology and policies ==
Fidesz's position on the political spectrum has changed over time.

=== Early years ===
At its inception as a student movement in the late 1980s, the party was positioned on the centre-left on the political spectrum; it advocated for liberalism and libertarianism. It was strongly committed towards anti-clerical and secular policies. As the Hungarian political landscape crystallized following the fall of Communism and the first free elections in 1990, Fidesz moved to the right four years later. Although Fidesz was in opposition to the Hungarian Democratic Forum's national-conservative coalition government from 1990 to 1994, Fidesz became the most prominent liberal-conservative political force in Hungary by 1998. It adopted nationalism, national-liberalism, and Christian democracy in the early 2000s. It was positioned on the centre-right, although it moved more to the right as the decade progressed.

=== Contemporary ===
Since the late 2010s, Fidesz has increasingly been described as far-right. The party is national conservative while favoring interventionist policies on economic issues like handling of banks. It has a strong conservative stance on social issues, a soft Eurosceptic vision towards European integration, and has been described as right-wing populist. Its ruling style has also been variously described as "soft fascism", "soft dictatorship", and "soft autocracy". The Fidesz party has denied such accusations and distanced itself from the extreme right, criticizing such accusations as politically motivated opposition to its anti-immigrant policies and pursuit of illiberal democracy.

=== Illiberal democracy ===
Countries autocratizing (red) or democratizing (blue) substantially and significantly (2010–2020). Countries in grey are substantially unchanged. During this decade, Hungary was one of the countries that had the most democratic backsliding.

Orbán and other Fidesz politicians have prominently described their model of government as a Christian illiberal democracy.

Orbán has described liberal democracy as having undemocratic characteristics because of "being intolerant of alternative views" and being incompatible with and antithetical to Christian democracy (saying: "Christian democracy is, by definition, not liberal: it is, if you like, illiberal."). Orbán has praised Turkey, Russia, China, and Singapore as successful examples of illiberal states.

The 17th Amendment to the Hungarian Fundamental Law, enacted by the Tisza Party majority on 13 July 2026, was harshly criticized by the Fidesz opposition as an intolerant violation of democratic values, e.g. the immediate removal of the sitting President Tamás Sulyok. Sulyok called it "a dark day for Hungarian democracy". János Boka explained, that because the removal of Sulyok is illegitimate, Fidesz boycotts the election and inauguration of András Baka as the new president in the parliament, which is "equally illegitimate".

==== System of National Cooperation (NER) ====
Clientelism plays a central role in Fidesz's governance strategy. Fidesz uses European Union and Hungarian state monies to support an extensive network of infrastructure projects, commercial enterprises, nonprofits, academic or para-academic institutions (e.g., Mathias Corvinus Collegium), and religious and cultural institutions—including the established churches like the Catholic and Reformed Churches—both within Hungary and in the diaspora. Fidesz uses this network to attempt to create and preserve an ethnic Hungarian national bourgeoisie or "Establishment" with strong financial, ideological, and familial ties to the party leadership. In return, the party expects these groups' overt or tacit political support. In Hungary, this governance strategy is (originally descriptively, but now primarily pejoratively) called the System of National Cooperation (Nemzeti Együttműködés Rendszere, NER).

=== Economy ===
Like the Hungarian right in general, Fidesz has been more skeptical of the neoliberal economic policies than the Hungarian left. According to researchers, the elites of the Hungarian left (the Hungarian Socialist Party and the former Alliance of Free Democrats) have been differentiated from the right by being more supportive of the classical liberal economic policies, while the right (especially extreme right) has advocated more economic interventionist policies. In contrast, on issues like church and state and family policies, the liberals show alignment along the traditional left–right spectrum. In the past, Fidesz has implemented several economic liberal policies, including an income flat tax, reductions in the corporate tax rate, restrictions on unemployment benefits, and privatization of state-owned land.

The Fidesz government has embraced some government schemes, including "public works job program, pension hikes, utility bill cuts, a minimum wage increase and cash gifts for retirees." It has also implemented a national public works program aimed in particular at assisting neglected rural communities. It has sought national control of key economic sectors while assuming a cautious stance on economic globalization.

=== Foreign policy ===
==== NATO intervention in Yugoslavia ====
During the NATO-led bombing of Yugoslavia, Orbán refused the requests of the United States and Great Britain to invade the northernmost territory of Serbia in order to hinder the intervention of Serbian forces in Kosovo. However, he expressed concern about the situation of the Hungarian minority in Serbia and allowed NATO forces to use Hungarian airspace.

==== Invasion of Iraq ====
Fidesz opposed the 2003 invasion of Iraq and Hungarian participation in it, questioning the international legitimacy of the invasion.

==== European Union ====
Despite the conflict with the European People's Party and European Union (EU) institutions, Fidesz and the Orbán government have claimed to be not in conflict with, but purportedly in line with pan-European values. As he struggled to maintain rapport with the EPP, Orbán began forming a right-wing populist alliance to electorally challenge the conservative EU establishment despite voicing a desire for Fidesz to remain a member. Orbán and his government have clashed with the EU over the handling of the 2014–2016 European migrant crisis and the death penalty, which is prohibited by EU rules.

==== Russia and Ukraine ====
Hungary was the only EU member state to vote against financial aid for Ukraine during its conflict with Russia-sponsored separatists, and has been a vocal critic of EU sanctions against Russia for its actions in Ukraine. The main cause is that since 2017, relations with Ukraine rapidly deteriorated over the issue of the Hungarian minority in Ukraine. Hungary has been obstructing Ukraine's integration efforts in the EU and NATO, even though Hungary has also been continuously helping and supporting Ukraine, with an exceptional attention to Transcarpathia. Orbán has strongly criticized EU sanctions against Russia but abstained from vetoing them. The Fidesz government joined the UK-led diplomatic offensive after the poisoning of Sergei and Yulia Skripal, expelling Russian embassy officials. Orbán has hailed Russia as an exemplary case of illiberal democracy.

During his prime ministership, Orbán has been described as drawing closer to Russian president Vladimir Putin. The closer relationship between the two leaders and nations has however largely been motivated by a tighter economic relationship, part of the government's "Eastern Opening" strategy, announced in 2011.

The Fourth Orbán Government initially strongly condemned the Russian invasion of Ukraine, aligning the country with NATO and the European Union on the matter: Orbán announced that Hungary would be sending humanitarian aid to Ukraine, but declined to send military equipment. President János Áder (also a Fidesz member) strongly condemned the Russian invasion, comparing it to the 1956 Soviet invasion of Hungary. However, Fidesz soon realigned with its formerly pro-Russian position: the party repeatedly opposed sanctions against Russia, prompting international press to describe Orbán as "a key Putin's ally". Orbán has called for Russia and the United States to negotiate a diplomatic resolution to the conflict, stating that the Ukrainians could not win the war militarily.

=== Nativism and immigration ===
Fidesz adopted anti-immigration stances and rhetoric in the mid-2010s in the context of the European migrant crisis. However, starting in the early 2020s, the Orbán government began admitting increasing numbers of foreign guest workers into Hungary due to a labor shortage resulting from strong economic growth, native population decline, and rising wages.

Fidesz is opposed to multiculturalism. In a 2018 address, Orbán said: "We must state that we do not want to be diverse and do not want to be mixed: we do not want our own colour, traditions and national culture to be mixed with those of others. We do not want this. We do not want that at all. We do not want to be a diverse country." Orbán has "often expressed a preference for a racially homogeneous society." The government has modified the country's Constitution to make it illegal to "settle foreign populations in Hungary."

Despite a very low fertility rate that has led to a demographic deficit, the Fidesz government has remained steadfastly opposed to economic immigration that has been harnessed by other European countries to relieve its worker deficits. Instead, the government announced pecuniary incentives (including eliminating taxes for mothers with more than 3 children, and reducing credit payments and easier access to government-subsidized mortgages), and expanding day care and kindergarten access. The Fidesz government's child incentive program also offers a 10-million-forint government-subsidized zero-interest loan to married couples who are willing to have a baby after 1 July 2019.

=== Propaganda ===
The communication of Fidesz has been widely described as populist propaganda.

Since Fidesz–KDNP's 2010 landslide victory, government-critical media was removed one-by-one through legal and financial means, while oligarchs close to the government have acquired outlets. Hungary's public service broadcaster and other television channels and radio stations are united under the Media Services Support and Asset Management Fund (MTVA). Meanwhile, 476 media outlets – 80% of all Hungarian media – are operated by the Central European Press and Media Foundation (KESMA), filled with Fidesz loyalists. The media policy of the Orbán regime is based on limiting access to financial resources, undermining the independence of regulatory bodies, and hindering access to information of public interest. As a result, Hungary experiences two parallel media systems: one directly or indirectly controlled by the government, and the other being independent. Paid for by taxpayer money, Fidesz uses bought-up outlets, its social media empire, and outdoor advertising to spread manipulative and hostile disinformation.

During the 2015 European migrant crisis, a smear campaign was launched by Fidesz against George Soros, and his alleged "Soros Plan" of uncontrolled migration. Billboards across the country claimed that he wanted to settle millions of Africans and Middle Easterners in Hungary. Meanwhile, the Orbán regime portrayed itself as the ones who are defending Hungary's national interests. Migrants were depicted as terrorists who spread lethal diseases, threaten local culture, and rape women. This campaign led to the 2016 migrant quota referendum, the 2017 National Consultation about the "Soros Plan", and the 2018 Stop Soros laws. The "weak West", the EU, the UN, and "the globalists" were accused of orchestrating a population exchange, and were later blamed for exposing children to woke ideology, the promotion of homosexuality, and dangerous sex-change surgeries. In 2021, the anti-LGBTQ law was enacted, a referendum was held next year about "sexual propaganda" in schools, and Pride parades were banned in 2025.

Following the Russian invasion of Ukraine, Fidesz's communication falsely accused the opposition, Brussels, European countries, and NATO members of dragging Hungary into war by seeking to send weapons and soldiers to Ukraine. Painting Ukraine as the source of danger instead of Russia, Fidesz claimed that the opposition conspired with Volodymyr Zelenskyy to interfere with Hungarian elections. The regime's rhetoric divides Hungarians into peace-lovers and warmongers, and oppositional figures and organizations are labelled "pro-war". The 2024 and 2026 elections were portrayed as a choice between World War III and peace. Numerous Russian-style hostile smear campaigns were launched against Péter Magyar, leader of the Tisza Party and Orbán's main rival. Tisza was accused of increasing taxes, and accounts and organizations close to Fidesz released AI-generated videos discrediting him.

=== Social policy ===
Changes passed by the Fidesz government have given citizens the right to use arms for self-defense on one's own property. Fidesz has passed legislation criminalising homelessness. Fidesz has opposed proposals supported by Jobbik and LMP to require nightclubs in Budapest to close after midnight.

==== Christianity ====
Orbán has on multiple occasions emphasized upholding Christian values as central to his government, and has described his government as creating a Christian democracy. Hungarian Catholic bishop András Veres described some of Fidesz' policies, such as providing free IVF treatment for couples at state-run clinics, as being at odds with some Christian denominations, particularly the Roman Catholic Church, which opposes IVF. Orbán is a member of the Reformed Church in Hungary. However, the party has been described as taking a more secular position on abortion, the role of the church and education than its ally, the Christian Democratic People's Party.

==== Family policy ====
Fidesz is opposed to an abortion ban, instead preferring to promote natalism. However, the Fidesz government has introduced a requirement for women seeking abortions to listen to a pulse generated by the ultrasound monitor before making their decision.

The Fidesz government has introduced loan subsidies for married couples that have three or more children and a personal income tax exemption for women that have four or more children.

=== Other ===
==== Anti-communism ====
The party is anti-communist. In May 2018, the president of the European Commission Jean-Claude Juncker attended and spoke at a celebration of the deceased Karl Marx's 200th birthday, where he defended Marx's legacy. In response, MEPs from Fidesz wrote: "Marxist ideology led to the death of tens of millions and ruined the lives of hundreds of millions. The celebration of its founder is a mockery of their memory."

The Fidesz government spokesman Zoltán Kovács justified the government's controversial policies as an effort to "get rid of the remnants of communism that are still with us, not only in terms of institutions but in terms of mentality."

During the party's rule, statues of communists regarded as traitors have been removed with Fidesz politicians in attendance. In December 2018, Hungarian authorities removed a statue of Imre Nagy for renovation. Nagy was a Hungarian reformist communist politician who led the failed anti-Soviet 1956 Hungarian Revolution and was later executed for his role in the uprising; the statue was replaced with a memorial dedicated to the victims of the short-lived 1919 Hungarian Soviet Republic.

==== Poster campaigns and National Consultations ====
In addition to regular political advertising, Fidesz directs government organs to use taxpayer money to regularly produce and disseminate two major forms of political propaganda in Hungary: poster campaigns and so-called "National Consultations." These two techniques are meant to influence public opinion about controversial issues outside of the legally demarcated campaign season.

Past poster campaign subjects have included a grinning George Soros while calling on the citizens to oppose his purported support of illegal immigration (many of the posters portraying Soros, who is Jewish, were defaced with antisemitic graffiti); Soros and President of the European Commission Jean-Claude Juncker laughing together, with text suggesting Soros controls major European institutions (while also disseminating the accusation by letters sent to all Hungarian citizens); and the "distracted boyfriend" internet meme, retooled to promote family values. These "information campaigns" or "national messaging initiatives," as successive Fidesz governments have called them, have been allocated annual budgets in the tens of millions of euros.

National Consultations, meanwhile, are questionnaires sent to all citizens that survey their opinions on government policy and legislation. By posing loaded questions, Fidesz uses these questionnaires to disseminate Fidesz's ideological positions and agenda. A 2015 Consultation, for example, explicitly referred to a "Soros plan" to "convince Brussels to resettle at least one million immigrants from Africa and the Middle East annually on the territory of the European Union, including Hungary," wrote that this "is part of the Soros plan to launch political attacks on countries objecting to immigration and impose strict penalties on them," and then asked citizens whether they agree. Another questionnaire about family policy used the term "Brussels bureaucrats." On other occasions, such as just prior to elections, the government sent letters notifying citizens that it will reduce their gas payments by €38 and sent pensioners gift vouchers.

== Organization ==
=== Leaders ===
	Image	Name	Entered office	Left office	Length of Leadership	Note
1		Viktor Orbán	18 April 1993	29 January 2000	6 years, 286 days	Prime Minister, 1998–2002
2		László Kövér	29 January 2000	6 May 2001	1 year, 97 days	
3		Zoltán Pokorni	6 May 2001	3 July 2002	1 year, 58 days	
4		János Áder	3 July 2002	17 May 2003	318 days	
5		Viktor Orbán	17 May 2003	Incumbent	23 years, 185 days	Prime Minister, 2010–2026

=== Youth wing ===
The Fidesz youth affiliate Fidelitas was founded in 1996. In December 2022, Dániel Farkas was elected president, succeeding Boglárka Illés. Fidelitas is a member of European Democrat Students (EDS) and the International Young Democracy Union.

== International affiliations ==
Fidesz was a member of the Liberal International from 1992 to 2000. From 2000 to 2024, it was a member of the International Democracy Union. It is currently a member of Centrist Democrat International.

European Union

Following its ideological turn to conservatism, it joined the centre-right European People's Party (EPP) but was suspended on 20 March 2019. Fidesz MEPs left the European People's Party group in the European Parliament on 3 March 2021, after the EPP changed its rules to allow it to expel a party's entire delegation. It has served with the Non-Inscrits since then.

In July 2021, Fidesz signed a joint declaration with National Rally, Law and Justice, Vox, the League, the Brothers of Italy, the Estonian Conservative People's Party, the Freedom Party of Austria, Belgium's Vlaams Belang, the Danish People's Party, the Finns Party, VMRO – Bulgarian National Movement, Greek Solution, the Romanian Christian Democratic National Peasants' Party and Electoral Action of Poles in Lithuania – Christian Families Alliance on the future of the EU.

In December 2021, the party participated in the Warsaw summit with Law and Justice, the Estonian Conservative People's Party, the Finns Party, the Christian Democratic National Peasants' Party, Electoral Action of Poles in Lithuania – Christian Families Alliance, the Freedom Party of Austria, Vox, National Rally, Vlaams Belang and the Dutch JA21, signing a document outlining new collaboration at the EU level between the parties.

In January 2022, the party participated in the Madrid summit, hosted by Vox, alongside National Rally, Law and Justice, Vlaams Belang, JA21, the Estonian Conservative People's Party, the Freedom Party of Austria, VMRO – Bulgarian National Movement, the Christian Democratic National Peasants' Party and Electoral Action of Poles in Lithuania – Christian Families Alliance, signing a joint declaration on policies towards the EU and Russia.

In November 2022, Fidesz MEPs signed a cooperation agreement with MEPs from Sovereign Poland, Vox, Lega, the Freedom Party of Austria and the National Rally to collaborate within the European Parliament.

Patriots for Europe has MEPs in 13 member states. Dark purple indicates member states sending multiple MEPs, light purple indicates member states sending a single MEP.

In June 2024, Fidesz announced its intention to form the Patriots for Europe parliamentary group in the European Parliament, which subsequently included the Czech ANO 2011, Motorists for Themselves and Přísaha, the Freedom Party of Austria, the Portuguese Chega, the Dutch Party for Freedom, the French National Rally, the Italian Lega, the Danish People's Party, the Belgian Vlaams Belang, the Spanish Vox, Latvia First and the Greek Voice of Reason.

In September 2024, Fidesz joined Patriots.eu, a far-right European political party, which includes the members of the Patriots for Europe group and the Estonian Conservative People's Party.

European countries

Austria

Orbán has more recently cultivated close ties between Fidesz and the Freedom Party of Austria (FPÖ), noting "strategic cooperation" between the parties and "friendly ties based on mutual confidence and Christian-conservative values".

Prior to the 2019 Austrian legislative election, he held a joint press conference with FPÖ leader Norbert Hofer, where he wished the party success in the upcoming election and stressed the "similar views" of the two parties.

Belgium

Hungarian Justice Minister Judit Varga addressed a rally in Antwerp hosted by Vlaams Belang in June 2022, alongside representatives of other Identity and Democracy Party member parties.

Bosnia

Orbán released a video message endorsing Milorad Dodik, the leader of the Alliance of Independent Social Democrats (SNSD) and the president of Republika Srpska, ahead of the 2022 Bosnian general election. Orbán's government has reportedly provided political and financial support to the SNSD.

Czech Republic

Orbán sent a letter of support to Václav Klaus Jr.'s newly formed Tricolour Citizens' Movement in the Czech Republic in 2019. Orbán has a relationship with Klaus's father, President Václav Klaus, who has expressed support for Orbán's rule.

During the 2021 Czech parliamentary election, Orbán endorsed Czech Prime Minister and ANO 2011 leader Andrej Babiš, appearing alongside him at campaign events in the Czech Republic.

Croatia

Orbán expressed strong support for Tomislav Karamarko's leadership of the Croatian Democratic Union (HDZ), having written a letter endorsing Karamarko for his stance on immigration that was read out at an HDZ rally during the 2015 Croatian parliamentary election campaign.

Fidesz later established contacts with the International Secretary of the Homeland Movement, Stephen Nikola Bartulica.

France

Orbán initially rejected association with Marine Le Pen's National Rally, and instead endorsed François Fillon, the candidate of The Republicans, in the 2017 French presidential election.

However, in 2021, Fidesz opened relations with National Rally, congratulating Le Pen on her re-election as the party's leader. Orbán subsequently hosted Le Pen during her October 2021 visit to Budapest and had discussions with her regarding a formal alliance between the parties. Orbán released a video of support for Le Pen during the 2022 French presidential election, which was aired at one of her campaign rallies.

Orbán also has relations with Reconquête leader Éric Zemmour, hosting him in Budapest in September 2021.

Germany

Fidesz initially rejected cooperation with Alternative for Germany (AfD), describing the Christian Democratic Union of Germany and the Christian Social Union in Bavaria as its natural allies there.

However, in February 2025, Orbán invited AfD co-leader Alice Weidel to meet with him in Budapest. After the meeting, Orbán stated that with the rise in AfD's support, the German government could no longer penalise cooperation with it, and expressed his belief that "the AfD is the future".

Italy

Orbán has praised the tenure of former Italian Interior Minister Matteo Salvini, the leader of the League, declaring him an "ally and our fellow combatant in the fight for the preservation of European Christian heritage and the tackling of migration" after Salvini's departure from the Italian government in August 2019.

Orbán previously urged closer political ties between the EPP and the League, and cooperated extensively on immigration with Salvini, describing Salvini as "my hero".

Orbán has also fostered ties with Brothers of Italy leader Giorgia Meloni, but Meloni later blocked Fidesz joining the European Conservatives and Reformists.

North Macedonia

Orbán has also fostered close political ties with right-wing Internal Macedonian Revolutionary Organization – Democratic Party for Macedonian National Unity (VMRO-DPMNE) politician and former prime minister Nikola Gruevski. While awaiting a ruling on an appeal to a corruption conviction in early 2019, Gruevski fled to Hungary to evade a looming jail sentence. The whereabouts of Gruevski were revealed only 4 days after he failed to report to serve his prison sentence. Macedonian officials have suggested that Gruevski (for whom an international arrest warrant had been issued) was in contact with Hungarian officials in the days preceding his flight, and Macedonian authorities have launched an investigation into whether Gruevski was transported across the border in a Hungarian diplomatic vehicle. The Hungarian government denied accusations of impropriety.

Hungarian businesspeople close to Orbán that had previously invested into Slovenian right-wing media also entered into ownership of Macedonian right-wing media companies, propping up outlets friendly to Gruevski and his party. In May 2023, Orbán pledged that Fidesz would assist VMRO-DPMNE in "various policy areas" ahead of the 2024 Macedonian parliamentary election.

Poland

Prior to the 2019 European Parliament election, Fidesz announced it would discuss an alliance with Poland's Law and Justice (PiS) party if it leaves the EPP. The two nations' conservative governments have shared a close friendship and alliance for multiple years and the Polish government has pledged political support for Hungary within the EU.

Orbán and PiS leader Jarosław Kaczyński have vowed to wage a "cultural counter-revolution" within the EU together, with the Polish government seeing Hungary under Fidesz as a model for Poland.

The relationship between Fidesz and PiS deteriorated following the Russian invasion of Ukraine, after the two parties took different stances on the conflict. The relationship was later repaired after PiS lost power in Poland, with Mateusz Morawiecki inviting Fidesz to join the European Conservatives and Reformists (ECR) group in the European Parliament in February 2024.

Although PiS initially negotiated with Fidesz's Patriots for Europe group in June 2024, it later chose to remain in the ECR after disagreements over the ECR leadership were resolved. The Fidesz government also granted asylum to former PiS Deputy Minister of Justice Marcin Romanowski in December 2024.

Fidesz also developed ties with PiS's former junior coalition partner, Zbigniew Ziobro's Sovereign Poland party, particularly during the time period when relations with PiS were tense.

Serbia

Orbán has a warm relationship with Serbian President Aleksandar Vučić and his Serbian Progressive Party (SNS), with the Hungarian Foreign Minister Péter Szijjártó campaigning for Vučić before the 2017 Serbian presidential election. Companies close to the Orbán government have won public contracts with the Serbian government. The Serbian government has also been accused of taking a similar approach to the Hungarian government towards the media.

In May 2023, Szijjártó once again addressed an SNS rally in support of President Vučić, ahead of the 2023 Serbian parliamentary election. Fidesz has also participated in conferences hosted by one of the SNS's junior coalition partners, the Serbian People's Party (SNP), and included the SNP in a working lunch of Fidesz-allied right-wing parties hosted by Orbán.

In April 2025, Orbán sent a video message to a pro-government rally in Belgrade in support of Vučić, claiming that "foreign powers want to tell Serbs how to live".

Slovenia

Orbán has allied closely with Slovenian prime minister Janez Janša and the right-wing Slovenian Democratic Party (SDS) he heads, going so far as to campaign for SDS during the 2018 Slovenian parliamentary election. Businesspeople close to Orbán also provided funds to SDS-affiliated media companies that then also used some of the funds to purchase campaign ads on behalf of SDS to circumvent Slovenian campaign finance laws.

After the election, and while SDS was struggling to secure political support to form a coalition government, Janša again met with Orbán on a private visit to Budapest; during the meeting, Orbán also conducted a conference call with former US president Donald Trump with Janša joining in. SDS's unconditional backing of Fidesz within the EPP was reportedly pivotal in preventing Fidesz's expulsion from EPP, resulting in a more lenient suspension. In a letter to EPP leader, Janša warned of an "inevitable" split in the EPP if the vote to expel Fidesz were to take place.

Despite its close links, in 2024 when Orbán formed the Patriots for Europe, a new EU political group. The SDS, which has four MEPs, ultimately remained part of the EPP Group, while noting that not all SDS MEPs agreed with this decision.

Slovakia

Fidesz provided campaign advisers to Robert Fico's Smer party ahead of the 2023 Slovak parliamentary election. Prior to the election, Hungarian Foreign Minister Péter Szijjártó held a joint press conference with Fico. However, Smer declined to join Fidesz's Patriots for Europe group in 2024, citing an ideological divide with the right-wing parties involved. In November 2024, Orbán gave a video address to a Smer party conference.

In 2020, Hungarian officials from the Fidesz government suggested it was in their interest that the Slovak National Party win seats during the 2020 Slovak parliamentary election. Szijjártó also praised the Slovak National Party following a 2022 meeting with its leader, Andrej Danko, stating that "parties standing on national foundations always understand each other well" and emphasising their shared "Christian-conservative values".

Danko has close relations with Fidesz politicians, and has advocated for an alliance between the Slovak National Party, Smer, Hlas, Slovak PATRIOT and even Hungarian minority parties in order to form what he described as a "Slovak Fidesz".

Other

Orbán has also developed ties with Dutch Party for Freedom (PVV) leader Geert Wilders, Vox leader Santiago Abascal, Conservative People's Party of Estonia leader Mart Helme the Chega leader André Ventura, and Lithuanian National Alliance leader Vytautas Radžvilas.

As of 2024, the Finns Party rejects cooperation with Fidesz, strongly supporting the exclusion of Fidesz from the European Conservatives and Reformists Group (ECR) in the European Parliament. The Sweden Democrats initially ruled out cooperation with Fidesz altogether, but later insisted that Fidesz sign a declaration in support of Ukrainian territorial integrity prior to allowing formal cooperation.

Fidesz refuses cooperation with the Alliance for the Union of Romanians (AUR), describing it as "anti-Hungarian" and ceasing its attempts to join the ECR after AUR was admitted. Nevertheless, after a victory by AUR leader George Simion in the first round of the 2025 Romanian presidential election, Orbán favourably quoted Simion and expressed support for Romania in its "fights for Christianity and sovereignty", noting that while he would not personally support a candidate in the election, he would oppose attempts for "isolation or political revenge" against the next Romanian President.

Hungarian national minority parties

Some political parties of Hungarian minorities are said to be allies of the Fidesz like the Slovak Hungarian Alliance (MKP), the Serbian Alliance of Vojvodina Hungarians (VMSZ), the Ukrainian KMKSZ – Hungarian Party in Ukraine, and Hungarian Democratic Party in Ukraine (UMDP), Democratic Union of Hungarians of Croatia (HMDK), the Slovenian Hungarian National Self-Government Association of Prekmurje (MMNÖK), the Romanian Democratic Alliance of Hungarians in Romania (RMDSZ), the Hungarian Civic Party (MPP) and the Hungarian People's Party of Transylvania (EMNP). The Fidesz, the RMDSZ, MKP, VMSZ the HMDK and the Democratic Party of Vojvodina Hungarians (VMDP) support each other in the 2019 European Parliament election. The MKP, VMSZ and RMDSZ are members or associates of the EPP.

Non-European countries

Israel

Orbán and his government have also fostered close ties with the Israeli Likud government under Benjamin Netanyahu, with the two heads of government forging a cordial relationship, having known one another for decades. Netanyahu advised Orbán on economic reforms conducted by the Hungarian government in the early 2000s. Netanyahu later extended public political support to Orbán at a time when Orbán was confronting criticism for praising Miklós Horthy, Hungary's former leader, whose government passed anti-Jewish legislation and collaborated with Nazi Germany, and for allegedly employing antisemitic tropes in his criticism of George Soros. The Israeli foreign ministry issued a statement condemning Soros in a show of solidarity with the Orbán government. A Likud lawmaker also introduced legislation modeled on Fidesz's "Stop Soros law" in the Israeli Knesset.

United States of America

Orbán and his government have gained favor with US president Donald Trump and his Republican administration (in stark contrast to the policy of isolation practiced by the preceding Obama Administration). Orbán was the first European head of government to endorse Trump's presidential bid during the 2016 United States presidential election.

Trump has praised Hungary's immigration policies in a discussion with Orbán. The more amiable attitude of the Trump Administration toward the Hungarian government prompted criticism and a protest by 22 Democratic Party lawmakers that called for a more disciplinary policy towards the country's government over what they perceived as a problematic track record.

Steve Bannon, former head of Breitbart News and a former close associate of President Trump who had an integral role in Trump's electoral campaign and administration, has also praised Orbán and announced plans to work with Fidesz in orchestrating the party's electoral campaign for the 2019 European parliament election.

Other

The Fidesz government had a strong relationship with former Brazilian President Jair Bolsonaro of the Liberal Party, including sheltering him at the Hungarian Embassy in Brazil after he faced criminal charges. Fidesz also has ties with the founder of the Chilean Republican Party, José Antonio Kast, María Fernanda Cabal of the Colombian Democratic Center party, and the Argentinian La Libertad Avanza.

Orbán's Political Director, Balázs Orbán, suggested Fidesz has "many things in common" with the Indian Bharatiya Janata Party (BJP) following meetings with BJP politicians, including sovereignty, opposing progressivism, and support for peace in the Russo-Ukrainian War.

== Criticism ==
Fidesz has been accused of exhibiting anti-democratic and authoritarian tendencies while in government. The Fidesz-led government has been accused of severely restricting media freedom, undermining the independence of the courts, subjugating and politicising independent and non-governmental institutions, spying on political opponents, engaging in electoral engineering, and assailing critical NGOs. The Fidesz-led government has been accused of engaging in cronyism and corruption. Fidesz has been accused of antisemitism, and the Fidesz-led government has been accused of passing legislation that violates the rights of queer persons. Due to its controversial actions, Fidesz and its government have come in conflict with the EU on multiple occasions.

== Election results ==
=== National Assembly ===
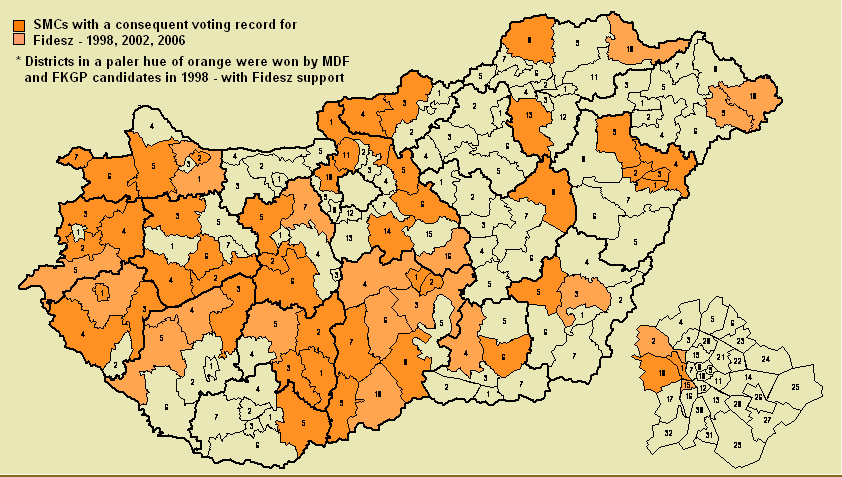
Fidesz strongholds: single-member constituencies electing a Fidesz MP in 1998, 2002 and 2006. Pale orange districts elected candidates of partner FKGP.

Election	Leader	SMCs		MMCs		Seats	+/–	Status
Election	Leader	Votes	%	Votes	%	Seats	+/–	Status
1990	Collective leadership	235,611	4.75 (#6)	439,448	8.95 (#5)	22 / 386	New	Opposition
1994	Viktor Orbán	416,143	7.70 (#5)	379,295	7.02 (#6)	20 / 386	▼2	Opposition
1998	Viktor Orbán	1,161,520	25.99 (#2)	1,263,563	28.18 (#2)	148 / 386	▲128	Coalition (Fidesz-FKgP-MDF)
2002 (Note: Run in coalition with MDF.)	Viktor Orbán	2,217,755	39.43 (#2)	2,306,763	41.07 (#2)	164 / 386	▲16	Opposition
2006 (Note: Run within Fidesz–KDNP coalition.)	Viktor Orbán	2,269,241	41.99 (#1)	2,272,979	43.21 (#2)	141 / 386	▼23	Opposition
2010	Viktor Orbán	2,732,965	53.43 (#1)	2,706,292	52.73 (#1)	227 / 386	▲86	Supermajority (Fidesz-KDNP)
Election	Leader	Constituency		Party list		Seats	+/–	Status
Election	Leader	Votes	%	Votes	%	Seats	+/–	Status
2014	Viktor Orbán	2,165,342	44.11 (#1)	2,264,780	44.87 (#1)	117 / 199	▼110	Supermajority (Fidesz-KDNP)
2018	Viktor Orbán	2,636,201	47.89 (#1)	2,824,551	49.27 (#1)	117 / 199	0	Supermajority (Fidesz-KDNP)
2022	Viktor Orbán	2,823,419	52.52 (#1)	3,060,706	54.13 (#1)	117 / 199	0	Supermajority (Fidesz-KDNP)
2026	Viktor Orbán	2,215,225	36.72 (#2)	2,458,337	38.61 (#2)	44 / 199	▼73	Opposition

=== European Parliament ===
Election	List leader	Votes	%	Seats	+/−	EP Group
2004	Pál Schmitt	1,457,750	47.40 (#1)	12 / 24	New	EPP-ED
2009 (Note: Run in a joint list with KDNP.)	Pál Schmitt	1,632,309	56.36 (#1)	13 / 22	▲1	EPP (until 2021)
2014	Ildikó Pelczné Gáll	1,193,991	51.48 (#1)	11 / 21	▼2	EPP (until 2021)
2019	László Trócsányi	1,824,220	52.56 (#1)	12 / 21	▲1	EPP (until 2021)
2019	László Trócsányi	1,824,220	52.56 (#1)	12 / 21	▲1	NI (from 2021)
2024	Tamás Deutsch	2,048,211	44.82 (#1)	10 / 21	▼2	PfE
