= Moler (surname) =

Moler is a surname. Notable people with the surname include:

- Cleve Moler (1939–2026), American mathematician and computer programmer
- Janja Moler (1780–1841), Serbian iconographer
- Janko Mihailović Moler (1792–1853), Serbian priest and artist
- Kathryn Moler (born c. 1966), American physicist
- Petar Nikolajević Moler (1775–1816), Serbian politician

== See also ==
- Moller
- Moser (surname)
