= Myller =

Myller is a surname. Notable people with the surname include:

- Alexander Myller (1879–1965), Romanian mathematician
- Ida Mae Myller (1879–after 1949), American evangelist
- Riitta Myller (born 1956), Finnish politician and former Member of the European Parliament
- Vera Myller (1880–1970), Russian mathematician who became the first female professor in Romania
