= László Miske =

Hungarian actor (1935–2025)

Miske László
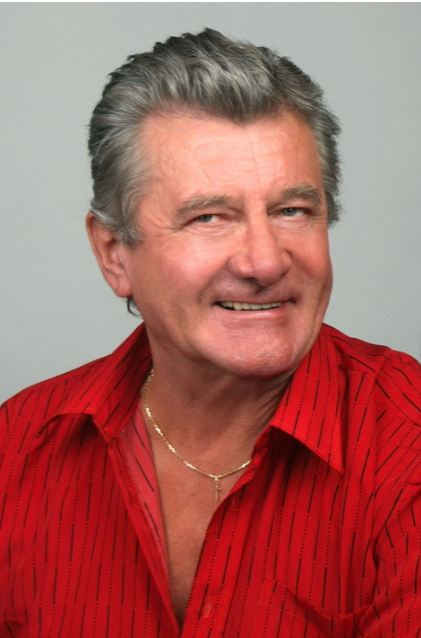
- Born: 18 September 1935; Zălan, Romania
- Died: March 2025 (aged 89)
- Citizenship: Romania, Hungary
- Education: Brassai Sámuel High School (–1954); Szentgyörgyi István Theatre Institute (–1966)
- Occupation: Actor
- Years active: 1966–2023
- Awards: Jászai Mari Award (2003)

Miske László (18 September 1935 – March 2025) was a Romanian and Hungarian actor, recognized with the Jászai Mari Award in 2003. He had a career spanning over five decades, performing in theatres across Romania and Hungary, most notably with the Csokonai National Theatre in Debrecen from 1992 until his retirement in 2023.

== Life and career ==
=== Early life and education ===
Miske was born into a Székely Hungarian family on 18 September 1935 in Zălan, a village in what was then the Kingdom of Romania. He attended school in Cluj (Kolozsvár), commuting from his hometown, and graduated from Liceul Brassai Sámuel in 1954. Initially, he pursued Reformed theology and worked as a pastor for two years before switching to acting. He studied at the Szentgyörgyi István Theatre Institute in Târgu Mureș (Marosvásárhely), graduating in 1966.

=== Theatre career ===
Miske began his acting career at the State Theatre in Oradea in 1966, where he performed until 1987. From 1987 to 1990, he joined the Hungarian Theatre of Cluj, and then moved to Hungary, working at the National Theatre of Miskolc from 1990 to 1992. In 1992, he became a member of the Csokonai Theatre in Debrecen, where he remained until his retirement in 2023.

Throughout his career, Miske took on a wide range of roles in classical and contemporary plays. Notable performances include Liliom in A. Molnár Ferenc’s Liliom, Bromden in Dale Wasserman’s One Flew Over the Cuckoo’s Nest, and Julius Caesar in Shakespeare’s Julius Caesar. In 2002, he received the Best Supporting Actor award at the Pécs National Theatre Festival (POSZT). He was honored with the Jászai Mari Award in 2003 for his contributions to Hungarian theatre.

=== Film and television ===
Miske appeared in several films and television productions, including Ítélet (1970), Honfoglalás (1996), Sacra Corona (2001), and A miskolci boniésklájd (2004). His television credits include the series A templomos lovagok kincse (1992) and Kisváros (2001), among others.

=== Personal life and death ===
Miske held dual Romanian and Hungarian citizenship and identified with his Hungarian ethnicity. Details about his family and personal life remained largely private.

On 29 March 2025, it was announced that Miske had died at the age of 89.

== Stage roles ==
- Oradea State Theatre:
- Liliom by Molnár Ferenc – Liliom
- One Flew Over the Cuckoo’s Nest by Dale Wasserman – Bromden
- A Midsummer Night’s Dream by Shakespeare – Theseus
- Kolozsvár State Hungarian Theatre:
- Bus Stop by Kao Hszing Csi-en – Master
- A Farcical Night by Caragiale – Chiriac
- National Theatre of Miskolc:
- Macbeth by Shakespeare – Duncan
- The Seagull by Chekhov – Samrajev
- Csokonai Theatre, Debrecen:
- Julius Caesar by Shakespeare – Julius Caesar
- The School for Wives by Molière – Arnolf
- Galilei by Németh László – Niccolini

== Filmography ==
- Films:
- Ítélet (1970)
- Honfoglalás (1996)
- The Blood of the Rose (1998)
- Sacra Corona (2001)
- Television:
- The Treasure of the Templar Knights (1992)
- Ábel in the Wilderness (1993)
- Dance of the Bees (2007)

== Awards and recognition ==
- 2002: Best Supporting Actor, Pécs National Theatre Festival
- 2003: Jászai Mari Award

== Legacy ==
Miske was regarded as a versatile actor whose career bridged Hungarian-language theatre in Romania and Hungary. His extensive repertoire and dedication to the stage earned him recognition as a significant figure in Hungarian performing arts.
