= Fidelitas (Hungary) =

Youth wing of the conservative Fidesz party

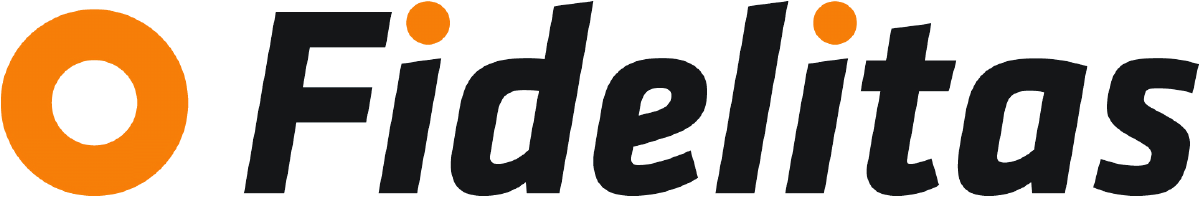
- President: Dániel Farkas (as of December 3, 2022)
- Founded: 11 October 1996
- Headquarters: 1358 Budapest, Széchenyi rakpart 19
- Ideology: National conservatism; Social conservatism; Right-wing populism
- Colours: Orange
- Mother party: Fidesz
- International affiliation: International Young Democrat Union
- European affiliation: Youth of the European People's Party (until 2021); European Democrat Students (until 2024); Identity and Democracy Party Youth (2023–2025)
- Website: fidelitas.hu

Flag

The Fidelitas is the youth organization of the conservative Fidesz party, founded in October 1996.

== Presidents ==
Period	Name(s)	Constituency (where applicable)
1996–2005	András Gyürk	None (1996–1998); Budapest Regional List (1998–2002); Fidesz National List (2002–2004); European Parliament (2004–2005)
2005–2009	Péter Szijjártó	Győr-Moson-Sopron County Regional List
2009–2015	Péter Ágh	Fidesz National List (2009–2010); Vas County Regional List (2010–2014); Vas County II (2014–2015)
2015–2019	László Böröcz	None (2015–2018); Fidesz National List (2018–2019)
2019–2022	Boglárka Illés	None (2019–present)
2022–	Dániel Farkas	
