= Boglárka Illés =

Hungarian politician (born 1988)

Member of the National Assembly
- Incumbent
- Assumed office 2 May 2022

Personal details
- Born: 1988 (age 37–38)
- Party: Fidesz

Boglárka Illés (born 1988) is a Hungarian politician serving as a member of the National Assembly since 2022. From 2019 to 2022, she served as president of Fidelitas.
