= Muhler =

Muhler is a surname. Notable people with the surname include:

- Joseph C. Muhler (1923–1996), American biochemist and dentist
- Marie Sheehan Muhler (born 1937), American politician

== See also ==
- Miller (surname)
- Muller
