= BETA (programming language) =

- Paradigm: Object-oriented
- Designed by: Bent Bruun Kristensen, Ole Lehrmann Madsen, Birger Møller-Pedersen, Kristen Nygaard
- Website: beta.cs.au.dk

Influenced by
- Simula

BETA is a pure object-oriented language originating within the "Scandinavian School" in object-orientation where the first object-oriented language Simula was developed. Among its notable features, it introduced nested classes, and unified classes with procedures into so called patterns.

It has been in development since 1976, with implementations known since 1986, by Kristen Nygaard together with Bent Bruun Kristensen, Ole Lehrmann Madsen, and Birger Møller-Pedersen, at the University of Oslo.

The project is inactive as of October 2020.

== Features ==
=== Technical overview ===
From a technical perspective, BETA provides several unique features. Classes and Procedures are unified to one concept, a Pattern. Also, classes are defined as properties/attributes of objects. This means that a class cannot be instantiated without an explicit object context. A consequence of this is that BETA supports nested classes. Classes can be virtually defined, much like virtual methods can be in most object-oriented programming languages. Virtual entities (such as methods and classes) are never overwritten; instead they are redefined or specialized.

BETA supports the object-oriented perspective on programming and has comprehensive facilities for procedural and functional programming. It has powerful abstraction mechanisms to support identification of objects, classification and composition. BETA is a statically typed language like Simula, Eiffel and C++, with most type checking done at compile-time. BETA aims to achieve an optimal balance between compile-time type checking and run-time type checking.

=== Patterns ===
A major and peculiar feature of the language is the concept of patterns. In another programming language, such as C++, one would have several classes and procedures. BETA expresses both of these concepts using patterns.

For example, a simple class in C++ would have the form

class point {
    int x, y;
};

In BETA, the same class could be represented by the pattern

point: (#
    x, y: @integer
#)

That is, a class called point will have two fields, x and y, of type integer. The symbols (# and #) introduce patterns. The colon is used to declare patterns and variables. The @ sign before the integer type in the field definitions specifies that these are integer fields, and not, by contrast, references, arrays or other patterns.

As another comparison, a procedure in C++ could have the form

int max(int x, int y)
{
    if (x >= y)
    {
        return x;
    }
    else
    {
        return y;
    }
}

In BETA, such a function could be written using a pattern

max: (#
    x, y, z: @integer
enter (x, y)
do
    (if x >= y // True then
        x -> z
    else
        y -> z
    if)
exit z
#)

The x, y and z are local variables. The enter keyword specifies the input parameters to the pattern, while the exit keyword specifies the result of the function. Between the two, the do keyword prefixes the sequence of operations to be made. The conditional block is delimited by (if and if), that is the if keyword becomes part of the opening and closing parenthesis. Truth is checked through // True within an if block. Finally, the assignment operator -> assigns the value on its left hand side to the variable on its right hand side.

=== Hello world! ===
This snippet prints the standard line "Hello world!":

(#
do ’Hello betas!’->PutLine
#)
