= Joost Möller =

Dutch politician

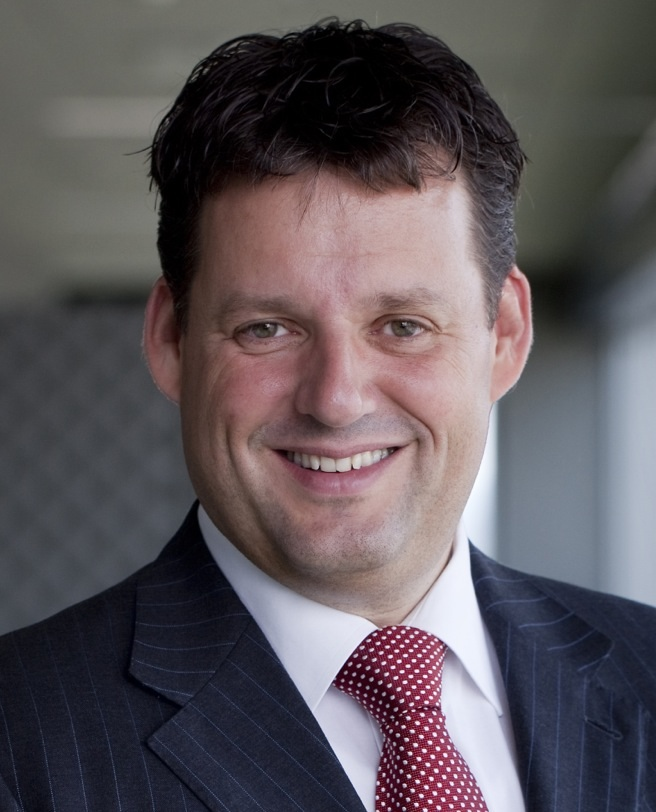
Joost Möller

J.H. (Joost) Möller (born May 20, 1967 in Eindhoven) is a Dutch politician of the People's Party for Freedom and Democracy (VVD).

Möller was a councillor of Tilburg from 1999 to 2008. Since 2008 he has been an alderman of this North Brabant municipality. From 2002 to 2010, he was also owner of an employment agency called Talentflex.

Möller studied business economics at Tilburg University.
