= Birger Møller-Pedersen =

Norwegian computer scientist

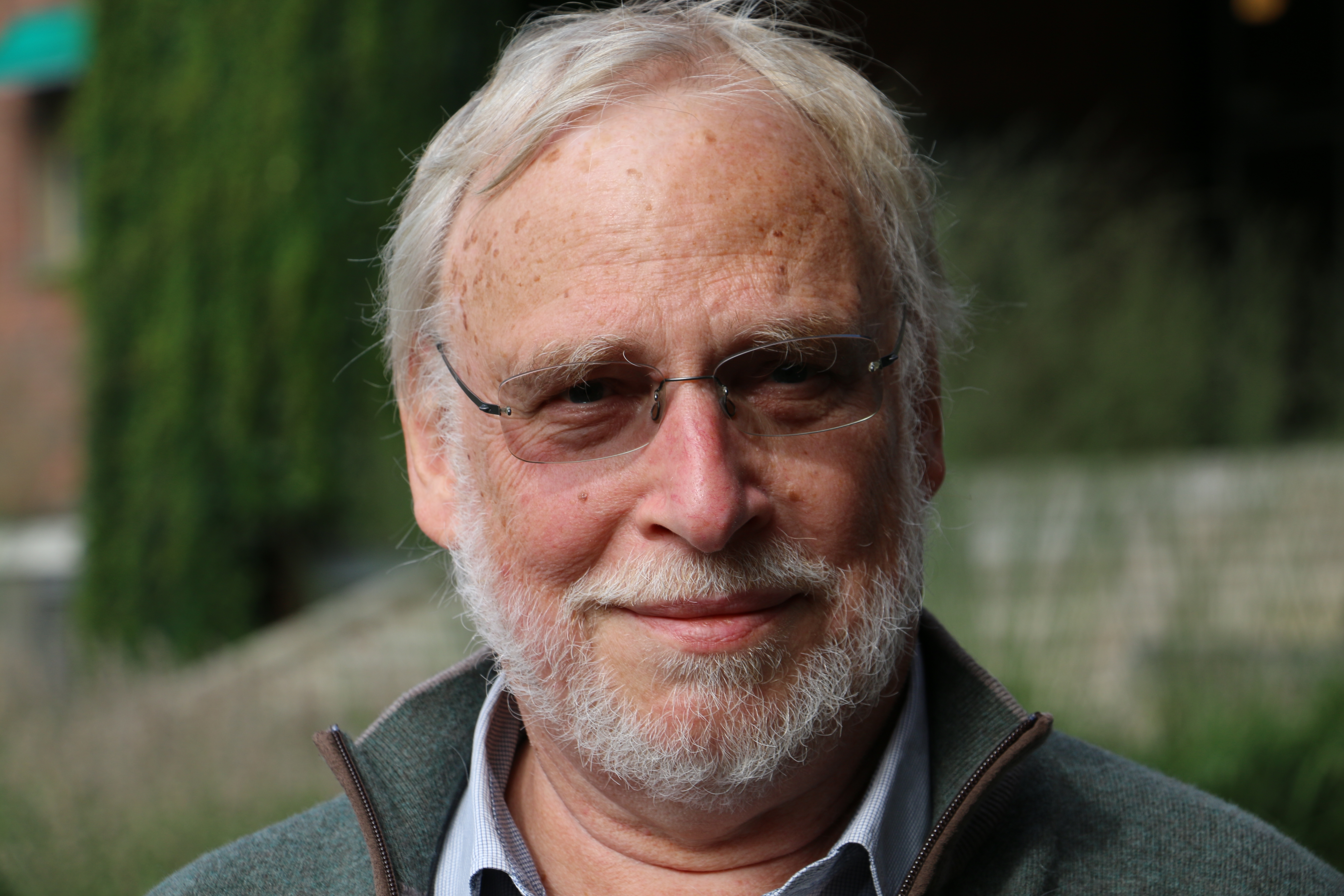
- Known for: BETA
- Scientific career
- Fields: Computer science
- Workplaces: University of Oslo

Birger Møller-Pedersen (born 11 November 1949) is a computer scientist and professor at the University of Oslo, department of informatics. He published numerous works on object-oriented programming and has contributed to the creation of the BETA programming language, which is a descendant of Simula.

== Academic work ==
Møller-Pedersen is a professor at the department of informatics at the University of Oslo, Norway. He teaches courses mainly in compiler design and programming languages.
