= Rosario Asela Molinero =

Mexican diplomat

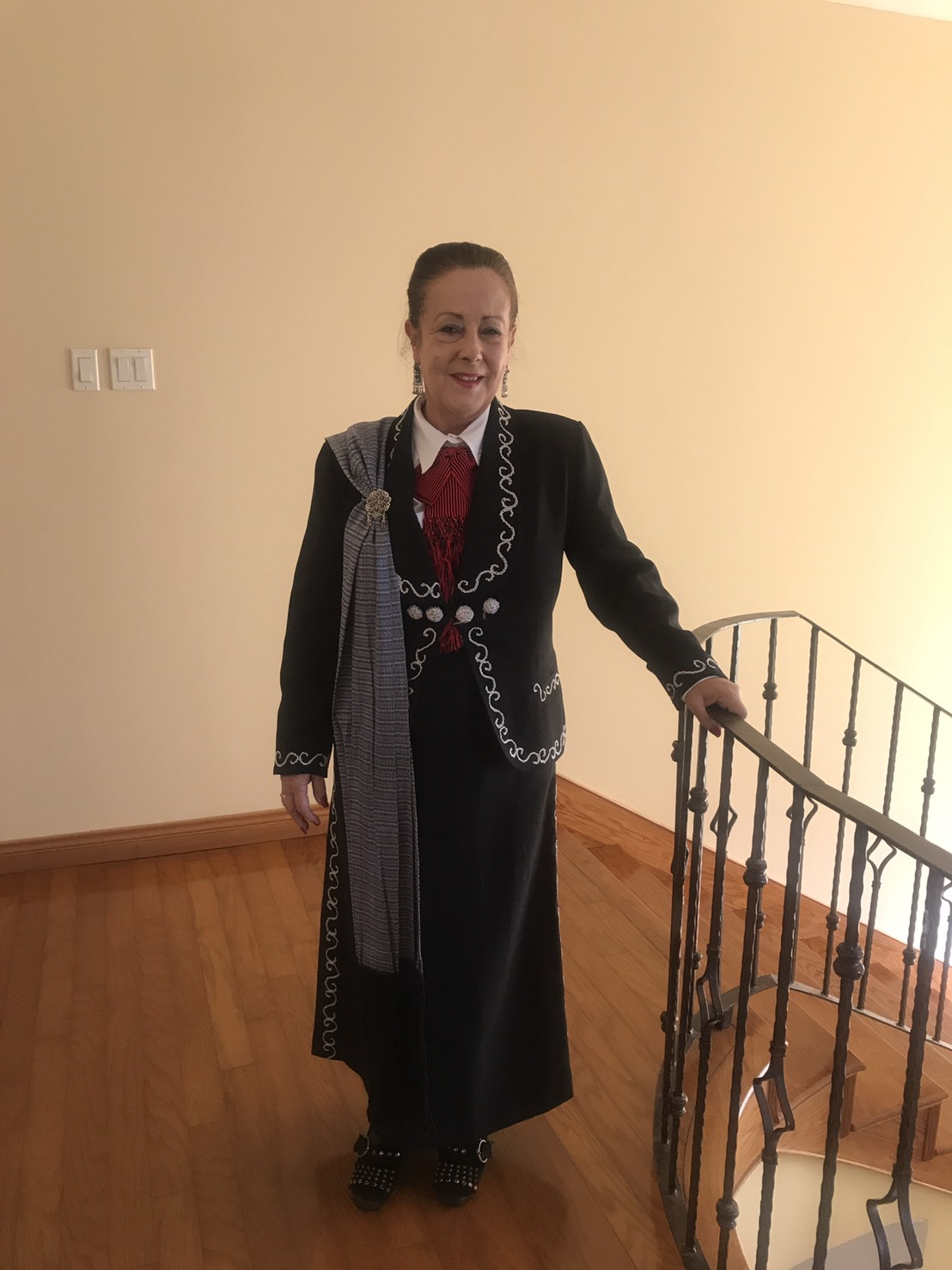
Molinero in 2018

Rosario Asela Molinero (born in Mexico City on October 6, 1957) is a Mexican career diplomat. She currently works as ambassador of Mexico in Hungary, concurrently with Croatia and Bulgaria.

== Early life and education ==
Rosario A. Molinero was born in Mexico City on October 6, 1957. She studied International Relations at El Colegio de México. After her BSc she obtained a master's degree in International Relations at the Diplomatic School of Spain and another in National Security at the Center for Superior Naval Studies of the Secretary of the Navy. She has been a Research professor at the Universidad Iberoamericana and the Autonomous Technological Institute of Mexico.

His undergraduate thesis entitled "Myths and Realities of Tourism in Mexico" won the CANACO 1983 award.

== Career ==
She has been a member of the Mexican Foreign Service since 1990. Her last promotion, through competitive examination, was to the rank of Minister in April 2009. At the Ministry of Foreign Affairs, she has worked in the General Directorates of Multilateral Organizations, American Regional Organizations, Regional Economic Organizations, and the United Nations. She served as Head of Economic Affairs and Cooperation at the Embassy of Mexico in Guatemala and as Head of Chancellery at the Embassy of Mexico in Sweden and Chargé d'Affaires to Latvia and Lithuania.

On March 16, 2018, she was appointed extraordinary and plenipotentiary ambassador of Mexico to the Republic of Trinidad and Tobago, concurrent to Barbados and the Republic of Suriname, and permanent representative of Mexico to the Association of Caribbean States. During the presidency of Miguel de la Madrid she served as the head of the Special Affairs office of the Presidency of the Republic.
