= Ida Mae Myller =

American evangelist

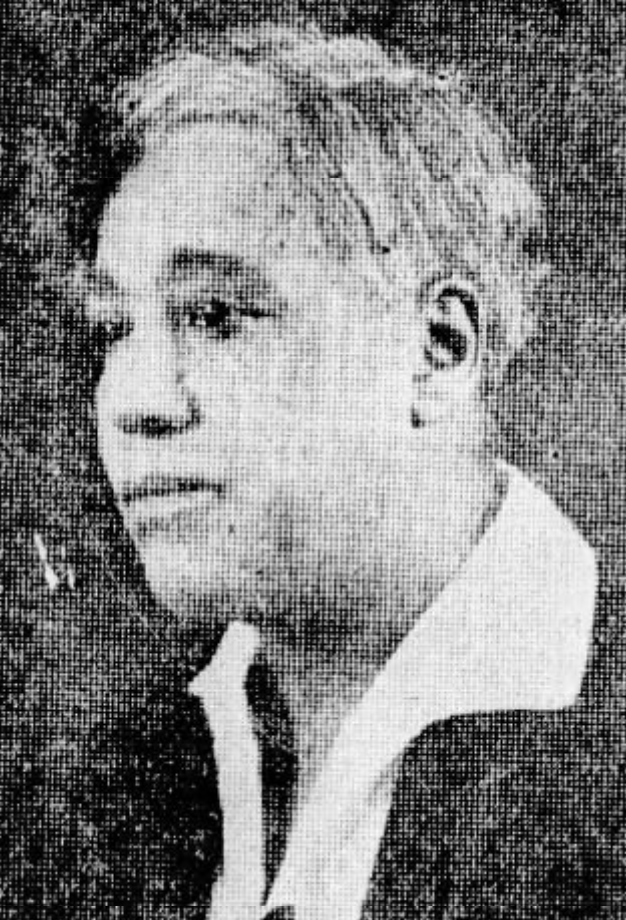
- Ida Mae Myller, from a 1929 newspaper
- Born: November 1879; Indianapolis, Indiana, U.S.
- Died: after 1949
- Other name: Ida Miller
- Occupations: Evangelist, chaplain

Ida Mae Myller (November 1879 – after 1949) was an American evangelist and chaplain in the African Methodist Episcopal denomination.

== Early life and education ==
Myller was born in Indianapolis, Indiana, the daughter of Lafayette Myller and Mary T. Myller. Her parents were born in Kentucky. She was one of the first women to earn a bachelor of divinity degree from Payne Theological Seminary at Wilberforce University. She received an honorary Doctor of Divinity degree from Wilberforce in 1925.

== Career ==
Myller was "an eloquent speaker and a gifted singer". She was a soloist at the Indiana Baptist Women's Home and Foreign Missionary Convention in 1911. She worked and preached in African Methodist Episcopal (AME) churches in Ohio, Montana, Alabama, and California in the 1910s and 1920s. She was chaplain of the National Association of Colored Women (NACW) for five years, and a member of Delta Sigma Theta. She initiated the charter members of the Kappa chapter of Delta Sigma Theta sorority in September 1922, making Kappa the second National Pan-Hellenic Council sorority chartered in California, after Alpha Kappa Alpha's Rho chapter.

Myller conducted a two-month revival in Memphis in 1932. She was a soloist at the first National Convention of Gospel Choirs and Choruses, held in Chicago in 1933. In 1934 Myller was assistant pastor at Metropolitan Community Church in Chicago, and she was one of two women on the executive council of Reverdy C. Ransom's Fraternal Council of Negro Churches, at its founding that year. She became a pastor at the People's Independent Church in 1936. She held a ten-day revival in Windsor, Ontario, in 1939.

Myller continued her touring evangelist work into the 1940s. She spoke at church events in Madison, Wisconsin, and Southern California in 1942, in Atlanta in 1943, and in Ann Arbor in 1946. She was an officer of a women's charity club in Chicago in 1949.
