= Georg Miske =

German weightlifter

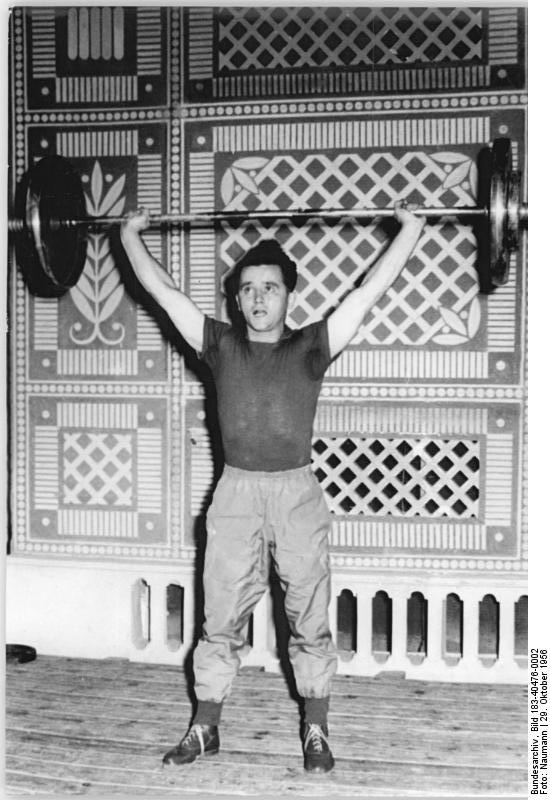
- Georg Miske in 1956

Personal information
- Born: 9 April 1928 Gliwice, Poland
- Died: 28 January 2009 (aged 80) Leipzig, Germany
- Height: 1.58 m (5 ft 2 in)
- Weight: 60 kg (130 lb)

Sport
- Sport: Weightlifting
- Club: ASG Vorwärts Leipzig
Medal record
Representing East Germany
European Championships
Bronze medal – third place	1957 Katowice	Featherweight, 100+90+117.5 kg
Bronze medal – third place	1958 Stockholm	Featherweight, 100+92.5+117.5 kg

Georg Miske (9 April 1928 – 28 January 2009) was an East German weightlifter. He competed in the featherweight category at the 1956 and 1960 Summer Olympics and finished in sixth, and 13th place, respectively. He won two bronze medals at the European championships in 1957 and 1958.
