= Molinero =

The Spanish-language surname Molinero literally meaning "miller" may refer to:

- Abel Molinero, Spanish footballer
- Abel Molinero Pons, Spanish footballer
- Emilio Molinero Hurtado, Mexican potter
- Francisco Molinero, Spanish footballer
- Florencia Molinero
- Pablo Molinero, Spanish actor
- Rosario Asela Molinero, Mexican diplomat
- Valeria Molinero, Argentinian physicist at the U. of Utah
