= Frans Möller =

Frans Möller may refer to:

- Frans Möller (tennis) (1886–1954), Swedish tennis player
- Frans Möller (swimmer) (1897–1995), Swedish swimmer
