= Peder Møller =

Peder Møller may refer to:

- Peder Møller (violinist) (1877–1940), Danish violinist and music teacher
- Peder Møller (gymnast) (1891–1972), Danish gymnast
- Peder Ludvig Møller (1814–1865), Danish literary critic
- Peter Møller (born 1972), Danish footballer
