= Daniel Wilhelm Moller =

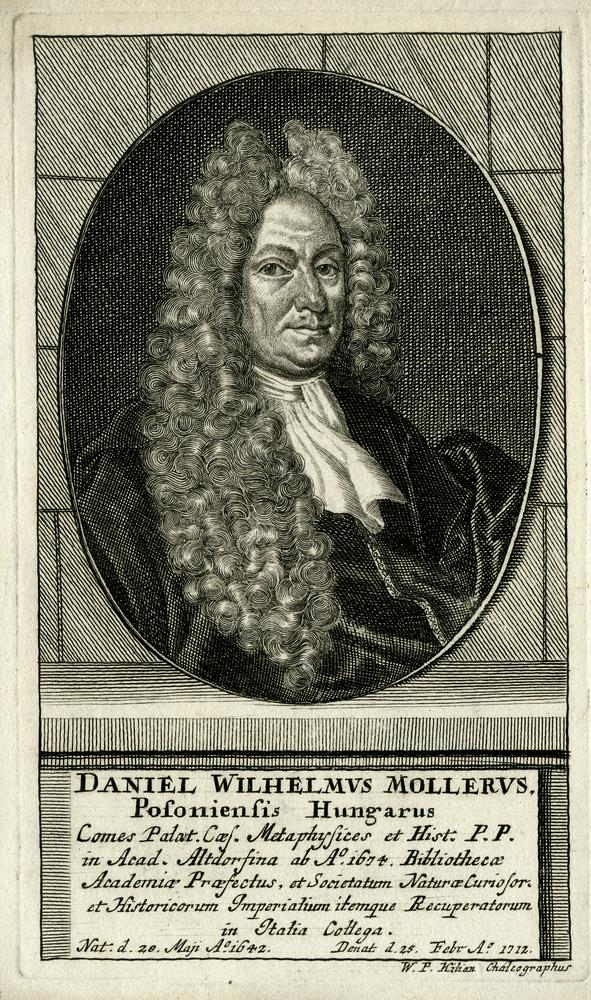

Daniel Wilhelm Moller (26 May 1642 – 25 February 1712) was a Hungarian historian, librarian, polymath, and humanist writer. He wrote under numerous pseudonyms including Ausonius Morelli, Dominikus Romelli, Weghold, Ollemiri, and Reimundus.

Moller was born in Bratislava where his father Otto was a jeweller and goldsmith from Sonderburg-Lineburg married to Rebekka Berghammer from Austria. He received his early education at the local Gymnasium and during a plague outbreak he studied at Trencsin. He then went to Leipzig and then to Copenhagen before joining the University of Wittenberg where he studied theology, philosophy, language and history. He went to Strasbourg in 1664 where he taught. He also travelled through Europe, meeting Athanasius Kircher in Rome. He returned to Bratislava in 1670 and taught at the Protestant Gymnasium. He protested the treatment of Hungarian Protestants and was chosen as a leader to meet Emperor Leopold I in Vienna. He became a professor of history and metaphysics at the University of Altdorf in 1674 and worked there until his death. He also held the position of librarian at the university.

Moller married Anna Sibylla Braun in 1685 who died childless in 1691. In 1692 he married Helena Sibylla, the daughter of the Altdorf professor Johann Christoph Wagenseil.
