= Antal Molnár =

Hungarian Church historian (1969-)

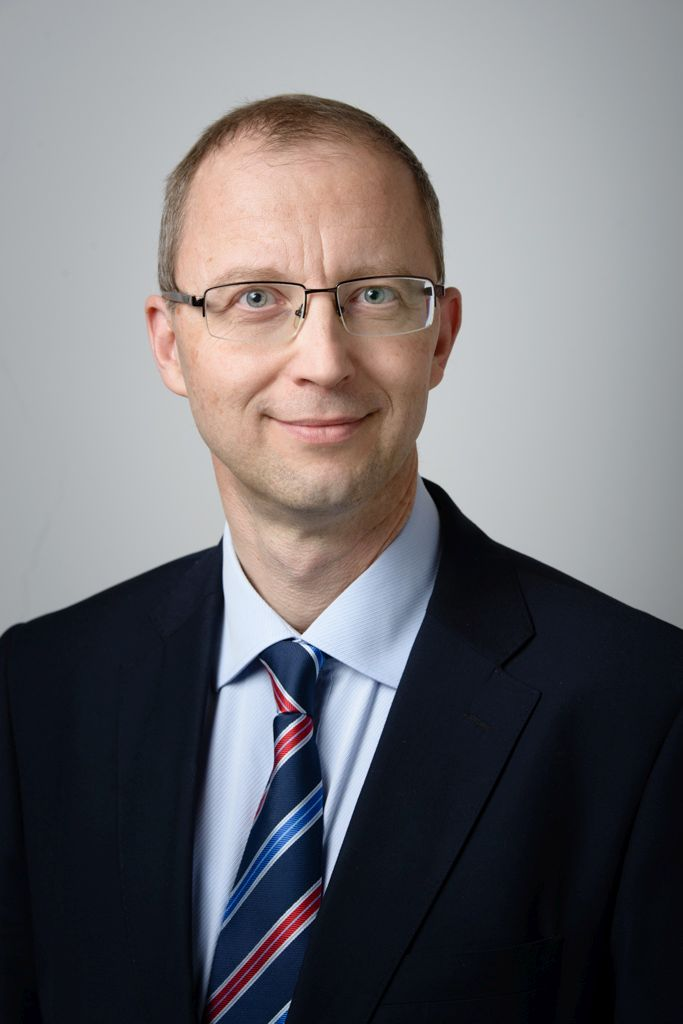
Antal Molnár

Antal Molnár (born 21 October 1969) is a Hungarian historian and ecclesiastical historian specialising in the history of the Ottoman Hungary and the Balkans in the 16th and 17th centuries. He is a member of the Pontifical Committee for Historical Sciences.

== Life and education ==
Antal Molnár spent his childhood in Sárosd (Fejér County). He completed secondary school at the Benedictine High School of Pannonhalma. After a year of military service, he gained admission to the Faculty of Arts at Eötvös Loránd University (ELTE) in 1989, studying Latin and History as a member of the Eötvös József Collegium. During 1993 and 1994 he spent a year in Paris as a student of the École Normale Supérieure with a French government scholarship, and in 1994 he obtained a D.E.A. (MA) degree in history at the University of Paris IV - Sorbonne. In the next two years (1995-1996), he graduated from Eötvös Loránd University as a lecturer in History and Latin language, and then completed his doctoral studies in Szeged and Paris. He achieved a doctoral (PhD) degree in Literary studies at the Attila József University of Szeged in 1999 and at the University of Paris IV - Sorbonne in 2002. Between 2000 and 2004, he completed a Turkish degree at ELTE, where he also habilitated in 2007. Between 1998 and 2000 he worked as an assistant professor at the Institute of History of the Péter Pázmány Catholic University. He has worked at the Institute of History of Eötvös Loránd University first as an assistant professor since 2000 and then as an associate professor since 2009, and then as a professor since 2023. From 1995 to 1996, he lectured at the Historians’ Workshop of Eötvös Collegium, which he then went on to lead between 2002-2005. In addition to his university work, he has been a senior researcher at the Institute of History of the Hungarian Academy of Sciences since 2005, and between 2010-2011, he was the head of the Department of Early Modern History. From 1997 to 2011 he also worked as an archivist at the archives of the Hungarian Province of the Society of Jesus. Between 2011 and 2016, he was the director of the Hungarian Academy in Rome.

He returned to work at the Institute of History of the Research Centre for the Humanities of the Hungarian Academy of Sciences as a senior researcher in 2016. He was appointed as the director of the Institute on 1 January 2019, and continued to work as an associate professor at the Institute of History of Eötvös Loránd University. As of 1 January 2020, he has been promoted to scientific advisor at the Institute of History of the Research Centre for the Humanities, which he continues to lead as director. Because of structural changes, the Research Centre for the Humanities is now a part of the Hungarian Research Network (HUN-REN). Antal Molnár was appointed as the Deputy Director General of the Research Centre for the Humanities on 1 January 2021.

He has been a member of the Pontifical Committee for Historical Sciences (Pontificio Comitato di Scienze Storiche) in the Vatican since 22 February 2021.

He was elected a member of the Szent István Academy on 5 December 2022. Since 2022 he has been President of the Committee on History of the Section of Philosophy and Historical Sciences of the Hungarian Academy of Sciences, and he has been a visiting professor at the Pontifical Oriental Institute since 2023.

== Selected works ==
- Katolikus missziók a hódolt Magyarországon I. (1572–1647). Bp., Balassi Kiadó, 2002. 587. [Humanizmus és Reformáció 26.]
- Püspökök, barátok, parasztok. Fejezetek a szegedi ferencesek török kori történetéből. Bp., METEM, 2003. 120. [METEM Könyvek 41.]
- A katolikus egyház a hódolt Dunántúlon. Bp., METEM, 2003. 213. [METEM Könyvek 44.]
- Tanulmányok az alföldi katolicizmus török kori történetéhez. Bp., METEM, 2004. 189. [METEM Könyvek 45.]
- Mezőváros és katolicizmus. Katolikus egyház az egri püspökség hódoltsági területein a 17. században. Bp., METEM, 2005. 322. [METEM Könyvek 49.]
- A bátai apátság és népei a török korban. Bp., METEM, 2006. 172. [METEM Könyvek 56.] (2. kiadás /változatlan utánnyomás/: 2008.)
- Le Saint-Siège, Raguse et les missions catholiques de la Hongrie Ottomane 1572–1647. Rome–Bp., Római Magyar Akadémia, 2007. 431. [Bibliotheca Academiae Hungariae – Roma. Studia I.]
- Elfelejtett végvidék. Tanulmányok a hódoltsági katolikus művelődés történetéből. Bp., Balassi Kiadó, 2008. 280. [Régi Magyar Könyvtár. Tanulmányok 9.]
- Lehetetlen küldetés? Jezsuiták Erdélyben és Felső-Magyarországon a 16–17. században. Bp., L’Harmattan, 2009. 286. [TDI Könyvek 8.]
- Egy raguzai kereskedőtársaság a hódolt Budán. Scipione Bona és Marino Bucchia vállalkozásának története és dokumentumai (1573–1595). Eine Handelsgesellschaft aus Ragusa im osmanischen Ofen. Geschichte und Dokumente der Gesellschaft von Scipione Bona und Marino Bucchia (1573–1595). Bp., Budapest Főváros Levéltára, 2009. 433. [Források Budapest Közép- és Kora Újkori Történetéhez 2. Quellen zur Budapester Geschichte im Mittelalter und in der Frühen Neuzeit 2.]
- Bangha Béla SJ emlékezete. Bp., Távlatok, 2010. 400. [Társszerző: Szabó Ferenc.]
- A zágrábi püspökség és a magyarországi katolikus egyház a 17. században. Bp., 2012. 115. [METEM Könyvek 77.]
- Kalmárok és káplánok az Oszmán Birodalomban. Források és tanulmányok a balkáni és hódoltsági katolicizmus történetéhez. Bp., METEM, 2013. 320. [METEM Könyvek 80.]
- A Falconieri-palota, Róma. Budapest, Balassi Intézet–Balassi Kiadó, 2016. 212 (dvd melléklettel) [Társszerző: Tóth Tamás]
- Palazzo Falconieri, Roma. Budapest, Balassi Intézet–Balassi Kiadó, 2016. 212 (dvd melléklettel). [Társszerző: Tóth Tamás]
- The Falconieri Palace in Rome. Budapest, Balassi Intézet–Balassi Kiadó, 2016. 212 (dvd melléklettel). [Társszerző: Tóth Tamás]
- Chiese e nationes a Roma: dalla Scandinavia ai Balcani. Secoli XV–XVIII. A cura di Molnár, Antal–Pizzorusso, Giovanni–Sanfilippo, Matteo. Roma, Viella, 2017. [Biblioteca Academiae Hungariae – Roma. Studia, 6.]
- Confessionalization on the Frontier. The Balkan Catholics between Roman Reform and Ottoman Reality. Roma, Viella, 2019. [Interadria. Culture dell’Adriatico, 22.] 268.
- Magyar hódoltság, horvát hódoltság. Magyar és horvát katolikus egyházi intézmények az oszmán uralom alatt. Bp., BTK Történettudományi Intézet, 2019. [Magyar Történelmi Emlékek. Értekezések]
- Die Formelsammlungen der Franziskaner-Observanten in Ungarn (ca. 1451-1554). Roma, Frati Editori di Quaracchi, 2022. [Analecta Franciscana XIX]. XLIX + 773.
- Zagrebačka biskupija i osmanska Slavonija u 17. stoljeću. Uloga Katoličke crkve u teritorijalnoj integraciji kontinentalne Hrvatske. Zagreb, Hrvatski institut za povijest, 2022 [Biblioteka hrvatska povjesnica. Monografije i studije III/98]. 225.
- Le relazioni „ad limina” dei vescovi di Cattaro alla Santa Sede (1592-1708). Izvještaji „ad limina” kotorskih biskupa Svetoj Stolici (1592-1708). Podgorica, Univerzitet Crne Gore, 2022 [2023]. [Documenta Vaticana historiam Montis Nigri spectantia I.] 419.
- Zsinatok háborújától a pannon illírizmusig. A magyar-horvát viszony újrafogalmazása a zágrábi zsinaton és Zaicz János pálos szerzetes emlékiratában (1634-1635). Budapest, 2023. [Irodalomtörténeti Füzetek 188.] 223.
- Magyar kutatások a Vatikánban a moldvai magyarság történetéről. Budapest, METEM, 2024. 119.

== Awards ==
- 2002: Klaniczay-díj
- 2003: Palládium díj
- 2004: Talentum Akadémiai Díj
- 2006: Szakály Ferenc-díj
- 2011: Mestertanár Aranyérem
- 2011: Premio „San Giacomo della Marca”
- 2019: Premio Roma 2019
- 2023: Academy Award of the Hungarian Academy of Sciences
- 2024: Officer's Cross of the Order of Merit of Hungary
