= Ferenc A. Molnár =

Hungarian linguist, Finno-Ugrist, librarian

- Born: 28 February 1942 (age 84); Nagyvárad
- Occupation: Linguist

Ferenc A. Molnár (born 28 February 1942, in Nagyvárad) is a Hungarian linguist. He is a board member of the Hungarian Linguistic Society. He is a corresponding member of the Finnish Literary Society. He is an external member of the Kalevala Society. He became a candidate of linguistic sciences in 1993 and a doctor of the Hungarian Academy of Sciences in 2007.

== Career ==
From 1961 to 1963, he was a Hungarian-English major at the Kossuth Lajos University. From 1963 to 1966, he also completed the Hungarian-Finno-Ugric program at the Kossuth Lajos University. From 1966 to 1979, he was a librarian and later a senior research fellow at the Library of the Kossuth Lajos University. In 1972, he earned his doctorate in Finno-Ugric linguistics. From 1976 to 1977, he obtained an advanced supplementary diploma in librarianship from Eötvös Loránd University. From 1979 to 1985, he taught at the Department of Hungarian Historical Linguistics and Dialectology at the Faculty of Humanities, ELTE. From 1985 to 1994, he was an assistant professor and from 1994 to 2007, an associate professor at the Department of Hungarian Linguistics at the Faculty of Humanities, Kossuth Lajos University. In 2002, he habilitated in Hungarian historical linguistics. Since 2007, he has been a university professor at the Department of Hungarian Linguistics at the Faculty of Humanities, University of Miskolc.

His research areas include the history of the Hungarian language, Finno-Ugric philology, the interpretation of old Hungarian literature, and folklore.

== Selected works ==
- On the History of Word - Final Vowels in the Permian Languages (Szeged, 1974)
- Mother Tongue, Religion, Culture (1999)
- Two Old Hungarian Prayers about the Eucharist (2000)
- Reguly Antal's Translations of Finnish Folk Poetry (2003)
- Studies on the History of the Hungarian Church Language (co-editor, 2003)
- Balassi Commentaries (2005)
- The Earliest Hungarian Textual Remains (2005)

== Awards and recognition ==
- Fokos-Fuchs Dávid Award (1978)
- Kalevala Medal (Helsinki, 1987)
- Nadányi Zoltán Memorial Plaque (1990)
- Széchenyi Professorial Scholarship (1999–2003)
- Károli Gáspár Award (2013)
