= Peter Molnar (geophysicist) =

American geophysicist (1943–2022)

- Born: August 25, 1943; Pittsburgh, Pennsylvania, U.S.
- Died: June 23, 2022 (aged 78)
- Occupation: Geophysicist

Peter Molnar (August 25, 1943 – June 23, 2022) was a professor in Geological Sciences at the University of Colorado. His research focused on aspects of how mountain ranges form and continental lithosphere deforms.

Molnar was born August 25, 1943, in Pittsburgh, Pennsylvania. He received a Bachelor of Arts degree in physics from Oberlin College in 1965 and his Ph.D. in seismology from Columbia University in 1970.

He was a winner of the Crafoord Prize and a fellow of the American Geophysical Union. He won the Crafoord Prize in 2014 for discovering "the driving forces behind plate motions and the place of continents in the plate tectonic model of Earth's evolution. Innovatively combining geological and geophysical methods of inquiry with satellite measurements and modelling, the Laureate has also paved the way to a new understanding of the formation of mountain ranges and their role in global tectonics."
