= Péter Molnár (academic) =

Hungarian academic and former politician

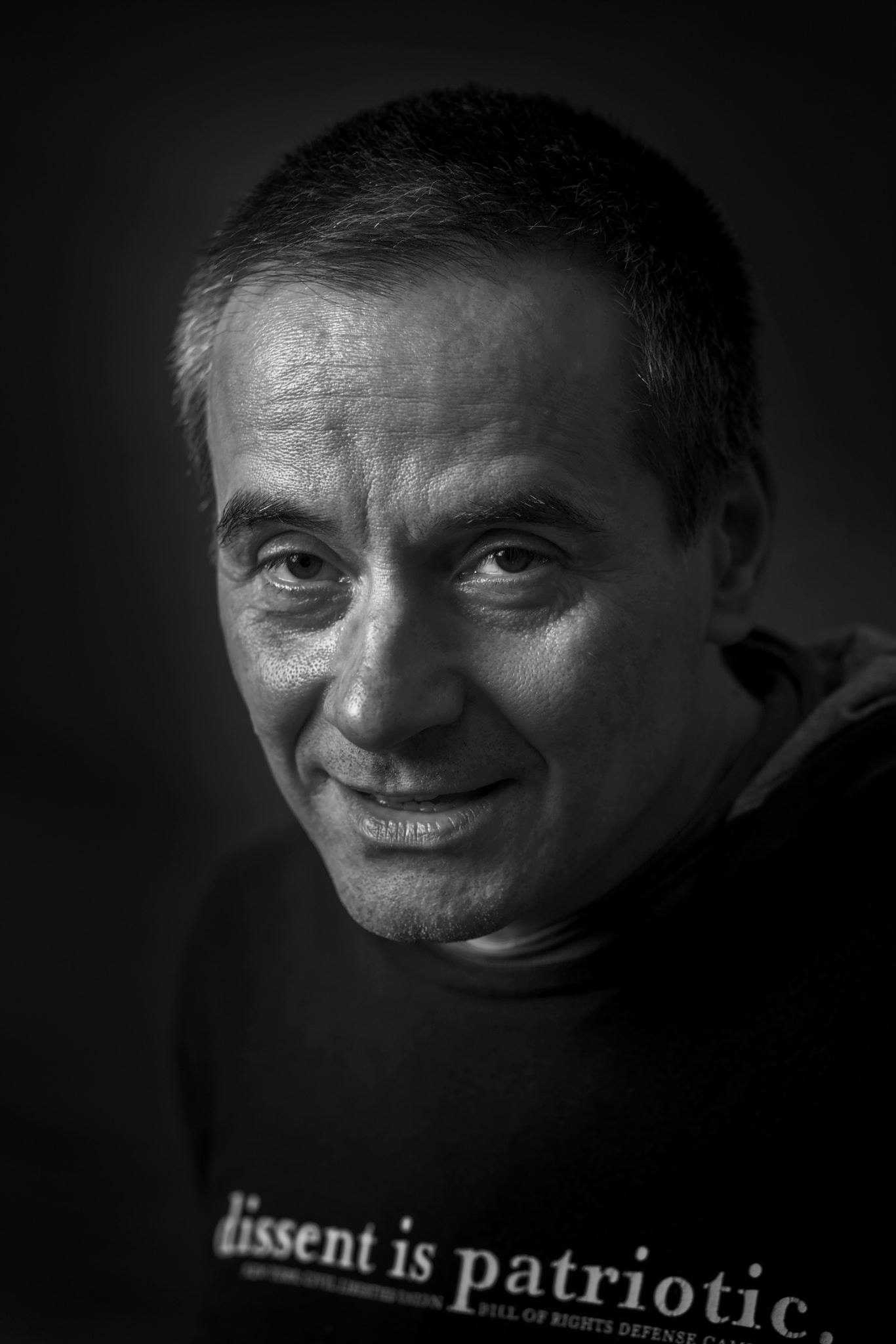
Péter Molnár

Péter Molnár is a Hungarian academic and intellectual, working on questions related to communication law and freedom of speech.

Molnár graduated from the Eötvös Loránd University (ELTE) in Budapest in 1987.

From 1990 to 1998, he was a member of the Hungarian Parliament, where he sat on the committees on culture and press and on the constitution. When (after its disappointing result in the 1994 elections) Fidesz changed its political position from liberal to conservative and added "Hungarian Civic Party" (Magyar Polgári Párt) to its shortened name, Molnar was one of many early Fidesz members who left the party.

In 1999 and 2000 he was a Fulbright fellow at Cardozo School of Law, at Columbia Law School, and in the spring of 2000 a fellow at the Joan Shorenstein Center on the Press, Politics and Public Policy at Harvard University. He has been a senior research fellow at the Center for Media, Data and Society at Central European University.
