= Marc Møller =

Danish footballer (born 1986)

Personal information
- Date of birth: 7 June 1986 (age 40)
- Place of birth: Denmark
- Height: 1.85 m (6 ft 1 in)
- Position: Defender

Youth career
- Ikast FS
- FC Midtjylland

Senior career*
Years	Team	Apps	(Gls)
2004–2006	FC Midtjylland	7	(0)
2006	Holstebro BK	14	(7)
2007–2011	Lyngby BK	37	(0)
2011–2012	FC Midtjylland	3	(0)
- * Club domestic league appearances and goals as of 1 July 2012

Marc Møller (born 7 June 1986) is a Danish retired professional football defender.
