= Ferenc Molnár (athlete) =

Hungarian triple jumper

Personal information
- Nationality: Hungarian
- Born: 4 February 1904

Sport
- Sport: Athletics
- Event: Triple jump

Ferenc Molnár (born 4 February 1904, date of death unknown) was a Hungarian athlete. He competed in the men's triple jump at the 1928 Summer Olympics.
