= Christian Möller =

German painter

Christian Möller (born in Ludwigshafen am Rhein, West Germany in 1963) is a German artist and painter. He studied at the Academy of fine arts (Staatliche Akademie der Bildenden Künste) in Karlsruhe by Horst Antes from 1986 to 1992.
