= Sabin Manuilă =

Romanian statistician, demographer and physician

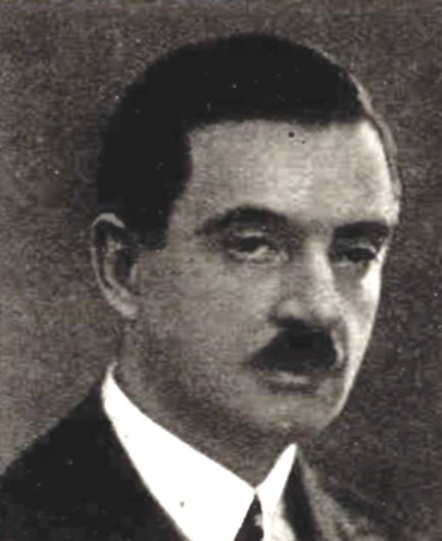
- Manuilă in 1934
- Born: February 19, 1894; Sâmbăteni, Arad County, Austria-Hungary
- Died: November 20, 1964 (aged 70); Parkchester General Hospital, The Bronx
- Education: University of Budapest
- Spouse: Veturia Leucuția
- Father: Fabriciu Manuilă
- Relatives: Vasile Goldiș
- Scientific career
- Fields: Epidemiology; Immunology; Serology; Demography; Biostatistics; Biological anthropology; Eugenics; Biopolitics; Geopolitics; Food science
- Workplaces: University of Cluj; Romanian Social Institute; Ministry of Health; Central Statistical Institute; Stanford University; United States Census Bureau

Sabin Manuilă (or Mănuilă; February 19, 1894 – November 20, 1964) was an Austro-Hungarian-born Romanian statistician, demographer and physician. A nationalist activist during World War I, he became noted for his pioneering research into the biostatistics of Transylvania and Banat regions, as well as a promoter of eugenics and social interventionism. As a bio- and geopolitician, Manuilă advocated the consolidation of Greater Romania through population exchanges, colonization, state-sponsored assimilation, or discriminatory policies.

Manuilă entered national politics in the early 1930s, representing the National Peasants' Party as a junior cabinet member. A disciple of the sociologist Dimitrie Gusti, who obtained him a membership in the Romanian Academy, he directed Romania's first Statistical Institute. During World War II, he rose to prominence as an expert adviser of Romanian dictator Ion Antonescu, applauding the antisemitic legislation and making antiziganism an official policy of the Romanian state. He was among the first intellectuals to propose the deportation of Romanian Jews and Romanies into occupied Transnistria. Additionally, Manuilă involved himself in the diplomatic standoffs between Romania and the Kingdom of Hungary, fighting against the loss of Northern Transylvania, then campaigning for her recovery.

By 1944, Manuilă was an Antonescu opponent, and involved himself in the August coup d'état that toppled him. He remained active on the political scene even after the start of Soviet occupation, serving as Undersecretary of State on two successive coalition governments. He fell out with the Romanian Communist Party, and escaped the country before the imposition of a communist regime, rallying with the Romanian National Committee. He lived his final years in the United States, employed by Stanford University and the Census Bureau.

== Biography ==
=== Early life and activism ===
Manuilă was born in Sâmbăteni, Arad County, on the traditional border between the regions of Banat and Crișana, both of which were then in Austria-Hungary. He was the son of Fabriciu Manuilă, a Romanian Orthodox Protopope from Lipova. As an ethnic Romanian activist, Father Fabriciu had been fighting the region's Magyarization, joining efforts with Sabin's uncle, Vasile Goldiș, who was a prominent militant in the Romanian National Party. As noted by scholar M. Benjamin Thorne, the Manuilă family also harbored racist prejudice against the Romanies (Gypsies), which may have shaped Sabin's political stances. He was educated at home and later graduated high school in Brașov. Since he could not pursue his studies in Romanian, Sabin entered the medical faculty of the University of Budapest in 1912, but remained active in Romanian nationalist circles, and published articles in political newspapers. He interrupted his studies from 1914 to 1918, taking part in World War I. A medic in the Austro-Hungarian Army, he saw action on the Russian Front, and was wounded.

By November 1918, following the split of Austria-Hungary and the democratization of Hungary, Manuilă was working as a physician in Lipova. He resumed his nationalist activities in support of Crișana and Transylvania's union with Romania, joining the Romanian National Guard and becoming its local commander. In December, he was called upon by his university colleagues to represent them at the Alba Iulia Great National Assembly, where he voted for union with Romania. The motion for union was read out by his uncle, Goldiș; Fabriciu and Sabin's brother, Camil Manuilă, were also present. In 1919, he obtained his doctorate in medicine. In 1920, he married Veturia Leucuția, a Banat native who would later become a doctor and set up an infrastructure for nursing education in Romania. She had also been a student representative at Alba Iulia.

Sabin was soon after employed by the University of Cluj, first as head of its children's hospital and assistant lecturer to Victor Babeș, then as head the social hygiene department. His scientific, teaching and publishing career took off between 1919 and 1926. He collected thousands of blood samples throughout Transylvania, pioneering the study of serology and immunology, and publishing his findings in Western scientific journals. During this period, he also began writing articles about epidemiology and the healthcare system's organization. His monograph on Epidemiile din Transilvania ("Epidemics in Transylvania") was presented by Babeș to the Romanian Academy, earning Manuilă the Academy Prize for 1921. His project doubled as an inquiry into racial science: Manuilă followed Ludwik Hirszfeld's ideas about the "racial index", concluding that there existed a distinct serological cluster of Balkan peoples, of which Romanians were a distinct subtype. The conclusion was discussed by other serologists: Gheorghe Popoviciu, who concluded that Manuilă's data were flawed, and that Romanians were not a race apart; and Petru Râmneațeanu, who believed that Manuilă was largely correct.

Manuilă became an assistant to Iuliu Moldovan, a pioneer in Romanian public health, but also a promoter of eugenics—a field which also interested Manuilă, who suggested the sterilization of the disabled and the encouragement of births among the healthy. The recipient of a Rockefeller Scholarship, he studied biostatistics at Johns Hopkins School of Medicine in Baltimore in 1925–1926. Visiting Charles Davenport's laboratory, he became convinced that American liberal eugenicism was a viable model for Romania. Also a Rockefeller scholar, Veturia followed her husband to America. She became an enthusiast of social work and interventionism, and later an outspoken conservative feminist. Camil Manuilă, meanwhile, settled in Timișoara and became a noted figure in the business community, and eventually secretary of the Banat Chamber of Commerce and Industry. In 1925, he was president of the Romanian Football Federation.

=== Bucharest relocation and 1930 census ===
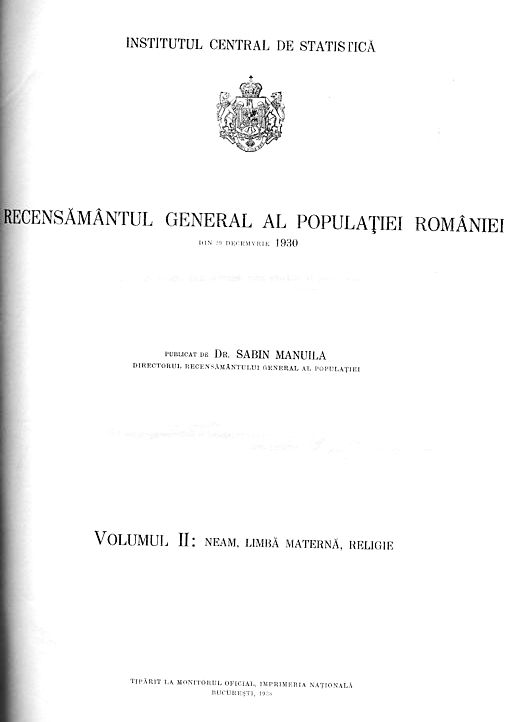
A title page of the 1930 census, featuring Manuilă's name

Upon his return, Manuilă was named inspector general for public health in Transylvania. In 1927, he gave lectures on eugenics and biopolitics at ASTRA Society. Founding a biopolitical and biometrical research center at Cluj University, he began cooperating with the eugenicist Sheldon C. Reed on "biological issues".

Also in 1927, Manuilă moved to the national capital, Bucharest, where he began collaborating with Dimitrie Gusti and with the statistical school of Octav Onicescu. Focusing on biopolitics, his research took him into the exploration of local demographics and demographic history. He was especially active in the field of "ethnodemographic prognosis", one of the first and few Romanians who took up this chore. According to fellow statistician Nicholas Georgescu-Roegen, his "organisation of Romania's vital statistics was an international paragon".

In 1929, he entered Gusti's Romanian Social Institute, and that year, together with five other doctors, he participated in a Gusti-coordinated monograph-writing campaign at Drăguș village in the vicinity of Făgăraș. As such, he led operations for the nationwide census of 1930, sponsored by the Rockefeller Foundation, subsequently leading the Institute of Demography and Census. At the Social Institute, with Gusti's consent, he established a section for eugenics and biological anthropology. Supervised by Gusti and funded by the Rockefeller Foundation, Manuilă and his wife also created a Bucharest School of Social Work, which doubled as an institute for the propagation of eugenic ideals. It was located on YMCA grounds, and had Henri H. Stahl, Francisc Rainer, Gheorghe Banu, Mircea Vulcănescu, and Xenia Costa-Foru among its lecturers.

At the time, Manuilă himself made groundbreaking discoveries about the demography of Transylvania and the Romanianization of its cities. In 1929, he put out the treatise Evoluția demografică a orașelor și minorităţilor etnice din Transilvania ("The Demographic Evolution of Cities and Ethnic Minorities in Transylvania"), which earned him another Academy prize. He made projects about population exchanges between Greater Romania and its various neighbors, with the goal of discarding "elements with a centrifugal tendency" and keeping "ethnic purity", and even proposed the colonization of his native Crișana with Romanians from Hungary. Moreover, Manuilă campaigned for the adoption of social welfare and biopolitical laws that, he argued, would curb emigration from Romania and promote the consolidation of a Romanian urban society. However, he believed that Romanianization was largely a natural phenomenon, and a facet of urbanization: the Romanian rural majority of the Austro-Hungarian period was moving into the cities. Uniquely among Romanian eugenicists, he endorsed fully the abortion-rights option, noting that natalism, while practical, should never infringe on a woman's informed choice.

=== ICS foundation ===
Active politically, Manuilă joined the National Peasants' Party (PNȚ), and began corresponding on social matters with the International Agrarian Bureau. From 1927 to 1930, he was a high-ranking civil servant within the Labor, Health and Social Protection Ministry, and was Undersecretary of State in a PNȚ cabinet, under Prime Minister Iuliu Maniu. He later became Maniu's adviser in matters of sociology. He represented Romania at congresses held by the International Statistical Institute, the International Institute of Sociology, the League of Nations Committee on Population, and International Union for the Scientific Study of Population (IUSSP). He sided with Corrado Gini's wing of the IUSSP, which promoted the natalist and racialist dogmas of Italian fascism.

In 1933, the advent of Nazi Germany brought racism into the focus of Romanian intellectuals. In a 1934 interview, Manuilă expressed biopolitical reserves about Nazi racial doctrines. Although he believed in the "evident scientific facts" of racial determinism, he observed that "racial science" was still "young", and argued that Nazis were "compromising" the racial agenda. He also stated that Romanian Jews were "not a racial, but an economic problem, to which was added a sentimental factor". In August 1935, he was Vice President of the IUSSP Congress in Berlin, which was effectively a propaganda display for Nazi biopolitics, with Eugen Fischer as the host. By the end of the decade, Manuilă became convinced about the dangers of miscegenation, an idea which came to him from fellow sociologist Iordache Făcăoaru.

Returning to the Institute of Demography and Census, Manuilă helped Gusti organize another expedition, this time to his native Sâmbăteni (1934), and studied first-hand the region's depopulation. He also refocused on his eugenic projects: in 1935, he helped establish the Romanian Royal Eugenics Society (presided upon by Gheorghe Marinescu), also attending the Congress of Latin Eugenic Societies in Mexico City. Also that year, he addressed a memo to the Ministry of Education, proposing to assimilate, peacefully but resolutely, Romania's Hungarian-speaking Székelys. He also insisted on his old idea of "eradicating" the Hungarians of Crișana and bringing in their stead Romanians stranded across the border in Hungary, and demanded a strict policy of linguistic discrimination in Transylvania-proper. Nonetheless, Manuilă toned down the racialism of other eugenicists, who wanted the Székelys and their Csango relatives to be counted as separate from Hungarians, based on claims that both of the former had Romanian ancestry. He reputedly based his rejection on a linguistic rationale, as all three communities were Hungarian-speaking.

In 1937, Sabin Manuilă was an official host, and Veturia a guest speaker, at the Bucharest Anthropological Congress, placed under the patronage of King Carol II. From 1938, Manuilă headed his own Central Statistical Institute (Institutul Central de Statistică, ICS), while also serving as Secretary General of the Statistical Society, seconding Gusti. This move was a sign of his quarrels with Moldovan, who nevertheless continued to influence the Manuilă's work. His new research produced several detailed monographs, including a 1937 study on Populația României ("The Population of Romania"), and a 1938 Romanian encyclopedia (Enciclopedia României), which detailed and examined the 1930 census data. Dealing with the Great Depression, his articles of the time discuss the "overpopulation" of Romania's universities as a cause of white-collar unemployment, proposing a government selection of the human capital. However, when Carol II ordered him to estimate the number of jobless people with a college diploma, Manuilă counted 6,000 individuals, which was well below official expectations.

=== World War II racism ===
Manuilă had a sinuous career during the first years of World War II, when his interest shifted toward geopolitics and historical geography. In 1938, upon Gusti's recommendation, he was elected a corresponding member of the Romanian Academy; until 1940, he was also a department head within Banu's Institute of Hygiene and Public Health. In 1939, Carol II's National Renaissance Front (FRN) terminated Manuilă's ICS, and all statisticians were left unemployed. During 1940, the regime again appealed to Manuilă's expertise. At the time, Romania had abandoned its friendship with the Western Allies, and was testing a rapprochement with Nazi Germany and the Axis powers. This, however, meant negotiating territorial exchanges with the Nazi-backed Kingdom of Hungary. With Mihail Manoilescu and other Foreign Affairs officials, Manuilă attended the meeting in Turnu Severin, where the Romanian side first took into consideration population exchanges between Romania and Hungary.

In the end, a Nazi-mediated Vienna Award carved out the region of Northern Transylvania and assigned it to Hungary. Manuilă was present at the proceedings. The ICS returned to prominence in late 1940: following the Award and the political turmoil it generated, Romania became a National Legionary State, ruled over by Ion Antonescu. Manuilă and his staff were directly subordinated to the Conducător, "substantiating governmental policy decisions" and, after Romania's entry into the conflict as a Nazi ally, making demographic projects in view of a future peace. Historian Viorel Achim noted in 2005: "Marshal Antonescu and other high-ranking officials would consult him on every population policy issue. While they did not always take his advice, he usually succeeded in bringing them round to his views."

Historian Vladimir Solonari notes that Antonescu's ascendency signified Manuilă's own promotion: "Antonescu [...] absolutely trusted his expertise", and presented the ICS with a state monopoly on statistical research. Also according to Solonari, Manuilă transformed himself into "an enthusiastic supporter" of Nazi racial policies, "that he now wanted to introduce in Romania." The ICS remained "the most important" instrument of "ethnopolitics", and as such mediated between Antonescu and Nazi racial scientists, in particular members of the Expert Committee on Questions of Population and Racial Policy. Manuilă built contacts with Friedrich Burgdörfer, Wilfried Krallert, and Alessandro Molinari.

As scholar Maria Bucur writes, Manuilă made a transition to the far-right, but without establishing "explicit links" with the governing Iron Guard. When the Iron Guard was eventually banned, following the rebellion and pogrom of January 1941, its leadership insisted that Veturia Manuilă had played a hand in the affair. They cited her as an anti-Guardist influence on the dictator's wife, Maria Antonescu. Manuilă did however support the passage of Jewish segregation laws, adopting the corollaries of economic antisemitism, according to which Jewish wealth and influence needed to be kept in check.

Map of the results of the 1941 census, with counties sorted by ethnicity. Romanians in purple, Ukrainians in light green (concentrated in Transnistria, Bukovina, and the Budjak), with Jews in yellow, Germans in red, and Hungarians in dark green. Romanies shown as slivers of light brown, with higher concentrations in Bucharest and Oltenia

Manuilă's antisemitism was more nuanced than the Guard's own policies. In his 1940 article about "racial commands", where he proposed to create a "Superior Council for the Protection of the Race", Manuilă insisted that the Jews were a largely harmless community, both self-segregated and endogamous. He elaborated on this issue with articles hosted by the Deutsches Archiv für Landes- und Volksforschung (1941), describing the "Jewish Question" in Romania as "qualitative", not "quantitative", and insisting that the Jewish population figures circulated in Romanian antisemitic circles were unrealistic. Instead, he claimed that "Romania's racial issue" was to be found among the Romanies (Gypsies), whom he described as "dysgenic", subversive, and exogamous. He endorsed their compulsory sterilization. This idea was supported by Burgdörfer, who described the Romanies as being of "capital importance" among Romania's issues in racial hygiene.

Manuilă soon began work on a new census, "a giant, extremely complex operation" which was intended to give added weight to Romania's claims on her neighbors. According to historian Victor Neumann, this enterprise was also notable for the "ideologized criteria and notions" which it vented in its published form. A special section of the 1941 census involved the cataloging of all Jewish property, a summary of which was sent to the German Main Security Office. Manuilă also advised government to add the criminal status of Romani individuals in its census data, including sentences for being "work-shy".

=== Manuilă and Transnistria deportations ===
In late 1941, with Romania's participation on the Eastern Front as a German ally, Manuilă again proposed, in his memos to Antonescu, a population exchange, meaning to solve the issue of Northern Transylvania. He and Antonescu discussed this matter face to face, during a meeting in the Bessarabian town of Tighina. Manuilă also envisaged the mass return of ethnic Romanians from Bulgaria and Serbia, the eventual relocation to Germany of all Germans in Romania, and a voluntary repatriation of the Csángós and Romanian Turks. He later advised Antonescu on resettling scattered communities of Romanian Ukrainians into the more compact Transnistria. These were to be then moved in other areas, where they were to replace Jews, Ukrainians and Russian Bessarabians—a measure that was actually set in motion in November 1941.

Manuilă also discussed Romania's new shape in the New Order, proposing a revision of Greater Romania's pre-1940 borders, excluding most of Southern Dobruja. The country was to annex Pokuttya and Békéscsaba, but not Transnistria. She was also to cede much of Hotin, Storojineț, and Cernăuți counties to a Nazified Ukraine, and some western areas (including Salonta, Oradea, and Satu Mare) to Hungary. Some references were made to the Timok Valley and the traditional homelands of the Aromanians, but the project made no explicit annexation proposal concerning those lands.

More significantly, the paper also envisaged the unilateral deportation to Transnistria of all Romanian Jews and Romanies, identifying them as stateless peoples with no outside protection. This measure was supposed to enforce Romania's "ethnic homogeneity", and was presumably influenced by Manuilă's confidence in Moldovan's eugenic movement, but did not, in fact, call for the physical elimination of either community.

The Manuilă's working relationship with Antonescu also involved them in other issues specific to the Holocaust in Romania. Veturia Manuilă worked with Maria Antonescu on the state-run charity office, called Patronage Council. In addition to its social work attributes, the institution was involved in extorting Jews who were subject to deportation. In 1942, Manuilă's demographic inspections in Transnistria made him a silent witness of the 1941 Odessa massacre and death marches to Berezivka. Later that year, Transnistria Governor Gheorghe Alexianu ordered Manuilă and Făcăoaru to carry out an anthropometric study of the Romanian soldiers, to gather evidence on possible Jewish exogamy. In 1943, Antonescu assigned Manuilă, Făcăoaru, and Banu to a governmental task-force "for the Promotion and Protection of the Biological Capital of the Nation"; Moldovan was its chairman.

According to Achim, the population-exchange texts do not exhibit a racist agenda, and are also "non-imperialistic". They are "in unison" with Antonescu's policies of ethnic cleansing, but were not in themselves the basis of a government program. Nonetheless, one of the memos stands as a historical premiere, since Manuilă made official claims about a "Gypsy problem", again describing the Romanies as a "dysgenic" threat, "social and national non-values, and a racial hazard". He also assessed that Romanies had been systematically under-counted in the 1930 census, and that this apparent assimilation reflected "extreme humanitarianism" on the Romanian side, and had gone on for far too long. According to scholar Dennis Deletant, this approach is "redolent of Nazi ideology", seeking "scapegoats for the woes of the Romanian people". Both Deletant and Thorne note that Manuilă's eugenic ideas about the Romanies did in fact shape Antonescu's "ethnic policies", leading to the Romanies' deportation.

=== 1944 Coup and aftermath ===
Despite his official positions and involvement in racial projects, Manuilă was still affiliated with the PNȚ, which was in the semi-clandestine opposition to Antonescu. Radu Lecca, an Antonescu adviser who oversaw the deportations to Transnistria, later claimed that Manuilă was spying on the regime for the Americans. As noted by Achim: "Manuilă, despite his antiminority opinions, was perceived by many contemporaries, both before and after the war, as a democrat." At the ICS, he revived Gusti's old team in 1941, assigning them their own Office for Studies. He therefore collaborated with sociologists of all backgrounds: leftists such as Stahl and Anton Golopenția, alongside Făcăoaru, arrested by Antonescu for his role in the Iron Guard (Golopenția was directly involved in the project to resettle Romanians from Ukraine to Transnistria). With Manuilă's acquiescence, members of this team extended their protection to some 5,000 Jews, employing them at the ICS and preventing their deportation or internment in labor camps. This was contrary to Manuilă's regular agenda: in early 1942, he himself had sent Antonescu notes about deporting all "useless" Jews, the latter being defined by race. According to Bucur, both Manuilă and Făcăoaru were probably informed that the deportees were being decimated on arrival by a massive typhus epidemic.

The ICS also hosted an illegal cell of the Romanian Communist Party (PCdR), which worked closely with the communist resistant Lucrețiu Pătrășcanu. This group and the Institute as a whole played a major part in the antifascist coup of August 1944. During the events, Golopenția and his men occupied the building housing Radio Bucharest, while Manuilă, from his home on Schitu Măgureanu Boulevard, ensured communications between the PCdR and Maniu. Following the start of Soviet occupation, Manuilă joined the Romanian Society for Friendship with the Soviet Union (ARLUS), for a while heading its Sociological Section. At the same time, with an article in Revista Fundațiilor Regale, he argued that America's victory in the war was a direct evidence of its superior health policies.

Manuilă and Făcăoaru were publicly congratulated by the Jewish community for their role in rescuing their coreligionists. At the time, Manuilă was obfuscating his earlier participation in the passage of antisemitic regulations. In his December 1944 interview with the Jewish magazine Curierul Israelit, he asserted: "The adoption of racial laws constitutes a great aberration in the mind, is not congruent with this century, and is alien to the traditions of the Romanian nation."

Manuilă soon joined the Union of Patriots, a PCdR ally, and, in November, was appointed Undersecretary of State for Stately Organization, serving under Constantin Sănătescu. According to other sources, however, he was still (or also) a PNȚ representative. Under Sănătescu, Romania joined the Allies, and fought in particular against the Hungarians in Northern Transylvania. Manuilă was co-opted on the advisory council of the Commissariat for Transylvania's Liberated Regions, created by his patron Maniu as a special branch of government. Alongside the goal of returning Romanian administrators to the area, the Commissariat also made a specific point of dissuading Hungarian irredentism. Manuilă also campaigned internationally for the recognition of Romanian rule in Northern Transylvania, citing demographic and historical evidence in his English-language tract, The Vienna Award and Its Demographical Consequences (1945). He was consumed with a project to set up the Western Faculty of Medicine in Timișoara, with which he hoped to tackle the Banat depopulation issue.

=== Communist takeover and defection ===
Manuilă kept his government post after Sănătescu fell and was replaced with Nicolae Rădescu, but was forced out by the communist purge of the power structures, in March 1945. He returned to the ICS, but found himself in conflict with both the party cell and the corporate trade union. Having lost his job at ARLUS and his seat on the Romanian delegation to the Paris Peace Conference, he was eventually demoted by the Institute in August 1947. His position was filled in by Golopenția, who, although a protégé of the communist Miron Constantinescu, was seen by Manuilă as a worthy successor. Manuilă became a political suspect, but not because of his Nazi contacts; rather, Manuilă was perceived as an Americophile.

With Georgescu-Roegen and the state carrier inspector Max Manolescu, Manuilă considered a plan to escape from Romania by plane, but this was thwarted by police during a routine checkup. According to Georgescu-Roegen, their plan also involved Pătrășcanu, who had fallen out with his communist partners. Seizing his last opportunity just before the communist regime took over, Manuilă appealed to the anti-communist resistance figure Silviu Craciunas, who ran a people-smuggling operation. Using this channel, and with assistance from three Jewish anticommunists (Lola Roth and the brothers Leibovici), Manuilă crossed the porous border into the Hungarian Republic. Sabin and Veturia Manuilă defected in Austria, and eventually made their way to the United States.

In 1948, Manuilă settled in New York City, where he continued his scientific and publishing work. Additionally, he was involved in the exile community, taking part in its cultural and political activities. He worked with the Iuliu Maniu Foundation, the Assembly of Captive European Nations (ACEN), the National Committee for a Free Europe, and a virtual government-in-exile, the Romanian National Committee (RNC). He also headed a section on the Study of Displaced Populations at the International Institute of Sociology, under Gini's presidency. Veturia Manuilă was also involved in such work, joining the National Council of Romanian Women in Exile and speaking on Radio Free Europe. In 1952, Manuilă became an RNC representative to the United Nations and, three years later, was sworn in as an executive member of the RNC. His brother Camil was also a member of the RNC staff by 1956, by which time the committee's hope for an anticommunist takeover in Romania were evidently unrealistic.

In 1950, Manuilă debated over Romania's fate behind the Iron Curtain with George Sokolsky, the American broadcaster, who had noted that, as home to a fascist regime, Romania deserved its status. Manuilă retorted that: "for a period, [Romania] had a fascist government, it is true. But Romania has overthrown it with decision and firmness. Italy had, Germany had, Japan had fascist governments, which were never overthrown until conquered. Yet they are today recipients of American favors." As noted by scholar Johanna Granville, this reply omitted to mention that the overthrow of fascism had in fact resulted in Northern Transylvania being returned to Romania. Stranded in Romania and sacked from his position at the institute, Golopenția drew up schemes for the decommunization in Romania, recording his thoughts and his intention to contact Manuilă. His notes were picked up by the Securitate during the Pătrășcanu trial, and resulted in Golopenția's fatal imprisonment.

=== Later life and legacy ===
Professionally, Manuilă was employed by Stanford University Institute for Food Research, where he published a monograph on The Agricultural Economy of the Danubian Countries: 1935–1945, then as a Counselor for the United States Census Bureau. Working at ACE and the Commission for Refugees Help, he dealt with issues of social security, population trends, and refugees' social integration. During the 1950s, he also completed work on demographic histories of the Romanian Jews (Regional Development of the Jewish Population in Romania in 1957, Populația Evreiască din România in 1958). These brought him close to Wilhelm Filderman, the exile Jewish Romanian political activist and RNC affiliate, who helped him obtain raw data. Manuilă presented his and Filderman's findings at the International Statistical Institute's 30th Congress, in Stockholm (1957). However, according to Holocaust historian Jean Ancel, Filderman "knew nothing of Manuilă's 'other face'", and Manuilă profited from his "good faith" to grossly underestimate Romania's share in the genocide. Filderman's more realistic notes were never published by Manuilă, who mis-cited them as backing his own data; Filderman, Ancel notes, never had a chance to question the text, having fallen ill with Alzheimer's disease between their compiling and the Stockholm presentation.

In September 1963, Manuilă attended the 20th International Congress of Sociology, in Córdoba, Argentina, where he presented a paper on wartime demographics in Romania, noting the increase of living standards in the 1960s. He died on November 20, 1964, of a cerebral hemorrhage at Parkchester General Hospital in the Bronx. His widow Veturia continued to publish memoirs and studies in social science. She died in Brick Township in 1986. Stripped of his Romanian Academy membership during the four decades of communist rule, Manuilă was posthumously readmitted in July 1990, that is to say six months after the Romanian Revolution. Access to his archive at the ICS was strictly prohibited under communism, and remained restricted after 1989.

As critically noted by Bucur, his subsequent depictions in Romanian historiography are those of a "tolerant, rational, balanced" scientist, glossing over his wartime activities. Controversially, in the mid-1990s Manuilă's studies on minority populations were included in works of Holocaust revisionists Kurt Treptow and Larry Watts, alongside fabricated quotes from Filderman, in what was read as an effort to induce doubt about Antonescu's antisemitic crimes. Manuilă's claims and the related fabrications were reused in denialist claims stated by authors such as Gheorghe Buzatu and Raoul Șorban.
