= Paul von Lilienfeld =

Baltic German statesman and social scientist of imperial Russia

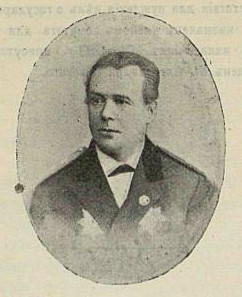

Governor of the Courland Governorate
- In office 1868–1885

Personal details
- Born: 1829
- Died: 1903 (aged 73–74)
- Occupation: social scientist

Paul Frommhold Ignatius von Lilienfeld-Toal (Russian: Павел Фёдорович Лилиенфельд-Тоаль, romanized: Pavel Fëdorovič Lilienfel'd-Toal'; French: Paul de Lilienfeld; 1829–1903) was a Baltic German politician and social scientist of imperial Russia. He was governor of the Courland Governorate from 1868 till 1885. During that time, he developed his Thoughts on the Social Science of the Future, first in Russian as Мысли о социальной науке будущего (Mysli o sotsial'noi naukie budushchego; 1872), and then in German as Gedanken über die Socialwissenschaft der Zukunft (1873–1881). Lilienfeld's thoughts, which he later articulated in compressed form in both French and Italian, laid out his organic theory of societies, also known as the social organism theory, organicist sociology, or simply organicism. He later became a senator in the Russian parliament, as well as vice-president (1896), then president (1897), of the Institut International de Sociologie (International Institute of Sociology) in Paris.

== Political career ==
Capozzi (2004: 92) describes Lilienfeld as "a Russian functionary who occupied himself with sociology as a form of intellectual diversion," while Ward (1897: 260, 264) refers to him as "Senator Lilienfeld," and Worms (1897: 657) qualifies him as a sénateur de l'Empire russe. Gerschenkron (1974: 435, footnote 24) calls him "a Balto-Russian," while Barberis (2003: 69) says he "descended from Swedish nobility, held important Russian judicial posts, was governor of Kurland for 17 years and ultimately became a senator of the Russian Empire." Lilienfeld, in fact, was governor of the Courland Governorate from 1868 till 1885, and in the same year in which he put out Social Physiology (1879), his brother, Baron Otto Friedrich von Lilienfeld, on either the 16 or 22 May, founded a seaside town along the banks of the Saka River on Courland's far western Baltic coast, naming it Pāvilosta (Paulshafen) after his sociologist sibling. Lilienfeld, who had studied at the Lycée Alexandre in Saint Petersburg, was awarded many honors in recognition for the services he performed for the empire; it would seem, however, that the aspect of his political career for which he felt most proud was his collaboration in the emancipation of Russia's serfs (Worms 1903: 265).

== Scientific career ==
In parallel with his administrative duties, Lilienfeld was "a tireless worker, always able to find room for scientific research" (Worms 1903: 265). Lilienfeld's research leaned towards social philosophy in general, and to speculations about the organic theory of society in particular (Worms 1903: 265), the first outlines of which he began to sketch, in Russian, in his Elements of political economy of 1860 and his Mysli of 1872, and to develop more fully in German as his Gedanken of 1873–1881 (Lilienfeld 1894: 825; Lilienfeld 1896b: xiii–xiv). Lilienfeld later served as both vice-president (1896) and president (1897) of the Institut International de Sociologie, which had been founded by René Worms in 1893 (Worms 1895: 881; Worms 1897: 657; Barberis 2003: 54–55).

=== Organic theory of societies ===
Lilienfeld's main work, Gedanken über die Socialwissenschaft der Zukunft (Thoughts on the Social Science of the Future), was issued in five volumes over eight years: I, Die menschliche Gesellschaft als realer Organismus [Human society as real organism] (1873); II, Die socialen Gesetze [The laws of society] (1875); III, Die sociale Psychophysik [Social psychophysics] (1877); IV, Die sociale Physiologie [Social physiology] (1879); and V, Die Religion, betrachtet vom Standpunkte der realgenetischen Socialwissenschaft, oder versuch einer natürlichen Theologie [Religion considered from the viewpoint of the real genetic social science, or attempt at a natural theology] (1881).

An anonymous reviewer in Mind noted that the first three volumes

start with the conception of Society as a real organism, and attempt to work out this point of view upon the methods proper to the Natural Sciences. The treatise commences with a demonstration that Society consists of individuals in the same manner as the physical organism is made up of cells, and that the one is real in the same sense as the other. With this idea the author seeks to exhibit a thorough-going identity between the laws of Nature as they exist in the case of its highest development, Society, and in its lower stages, including the individual human being.... The first three parts are worked out with great minuteness, the connecting thread being the conception of a real analogy between the individual and the social group as the essential foundation of the Social Science of the future (Anonymous 1878: 152).

Lilienfeld's fourth volume dealt with "the establishment and elucidation of the Laws of Development of the Social Organism from the physiological point of view" (Anonymous 1880: 298).

What precisely Lilienfeld meant by his term "real analogy" puzzled more than one other social scientist, including Lester F. Ward, writing in the pages of the American Journal of Sociology:

What is an analogy? In biology, which is the standpoint of [Lilienfeld] and of all defenders of the social organism theory in whatever form, this word has a very definite meaning — a technical usage — viz., physiological without anatomical similarity. It is contrasted with homology, which is anatomical similarity irrespective of function. If this is all [Lilienfeld] mean[s] by the analogy between society and an organism, there seems to be no objection to pursuing it to its utmost extent and determining how far social functions resemble organic functions, recognizing all the time that there is no real morphological or structural resemblance any more than there is between the wing of a bat and that of a bird. What, then, does Senator Lilienfeld mean by his oft-repeated expression, "real analogy"? Does he mean that here are homologies? It seems difficult to interpret him otherwise. Ward 1897: 260).

In 1896, Lilienfeld published summaries of his ideas in both Italian and French. Reviewing Lilienfeld's version of the social organism theory as well as the concurrent articulation of it by René Worms, Ward wrote:

Not only in the present treatise, but throughout his great five-volume work, and, later than either, in a pamphlet recently issued, he denies that society can properly be called a superorganism, as Mr. Spencer proposes, and insists that it is in very truth an organism. But what manner of organism does he make it out to be? An organism consisting entirely of a "social nervous system" and "social intercellular structure." Is there any such animal or plant as that? How much of the body of an animal consists of "intercellular structure"? Is not this expression to the biologist a contradiction of terms? What is "structure" in biology? Is it not wholly cellular (or vascular, in which the most highly developed cells are differentiated into vessels)? It is true, there are fluids of various kinds flowing through the animal body in various physiological capacities, but the blood is full of corpuscles, i. e., cells, and the lymphatics and secretions are not "structures." There are also some structures in the animal body that for physiological reasons are devoid of sensitive nerves, but they are all made up of cells. Lilienfeld and Worms both agree that individual men constitute the cells of the social organism, and both take this in a literal biological sense, that they represent the "real" cells as made known by Schleiden and Schwann. But the first of these authors maintains that the individual men in society taken together only constitute the nervous system of society, and that society is devoid of all the other systems of the animal body. In their stead we have the intercellular structure, which, as he says, is produced by the nervous system, or, as the biologists would say, secreted by it. And what is this intercellular structure of society? As I understand him it consists chiefly of the material (and perhaps spiritual) capital of society, the product of human labor and thought. Sometimes he seems to give it somewhat the scope that Mr. Spencer gives to society itself, as including the soil, water, air, flora, and fauna, in short, the environment of society. But if this is all intercellular structure and is only the product of the nervous system and not part of that system itself, where is the consistency in speaking, as both our authors do, of telegraph lines as analogues of nerves? (Ward 1897: 260-261).

In July 1897, the Third Congress of the International Institute of Sociology at the Sorbonne in Paris erupted with debate over the organic theory of societies. In the capacity of the institute's president, Lilienfeld, then a senator in the Russian parliament, traveled from Saint Petersburg and delivered the opening address on the afternoon of Wednesday, July 21. Remarks and the reading of two papers followed. The next day, Thursday, July 22, a paper by Lester F. Ward (not able to attend the conference) on "Pain and Pleasure Economy" was read in the morning, along with another paper by Italian sociologist Achille Loria. It was only after the break for lunch that the debate over the organic theory began. Jacques Novicow started by reading a paper in support of the theory. He was followed by Lilienfeld. Next, Gabriel Tarde heavily critiqued Lilienfeld and Novicow, "and presented in opposition to the organic theory a psychological theory of social life" (Worms 1898: 110). The session adjourned for the evening, and discussion resumed the next afternoon, Friday, July 23. Casimir de Kelles-Krauz opened the offensive against the organic theory with a salvo of economic materialism. Ludwig Stein then backed up Tarde and Kelles-Krauz with "the principles of the historical and psychogenetic method of research" (Worms 1898: 111). The founder and general secretary of the institute, René Worms, next "tried to show something of the exactness and utility of the analogy between organisms and society" (Worms 1898: 111). Worms's attempt, however, was rebuffed by S. R. Steinmetz. Furthermore, though Raphael Garofalo, Charles Limousin, and C. N. Starcke accepted the organic theory, they did so with reservations. The most withering attack on the organic theory seemed to come from Nikolai Karéiev, who "showed that this theory shared, together with Darwin's social theory, economic materialism and social psychic theories, the fate of all exclusive theories" (Worms 1898: 111). Alfred Espinas then tried to salvage the theory by maintaining that societies must "constitute organisms," or else one would have "to abandon altogether the idea of social life and social laws" (Worms 1898: 111). Novicow closed the section by reaffirming his faith in the organic theory, and Worms in his report stated that, by and large, the congress had "been productive of the most happy results" (Worms 1898: 109).

Though these debates in Paris were characterized as "more animated" than usual (Small 1898: 412), a reviewer across the Atlantic seemed to take them lightly:

It would hardly be possible to arouse American sociologists to very lively controversy over what remains in dispute. The men among us who make most use of the organic concept are satisfied that their opponents disagree with them only verbally, so far as the essential idea is concerned. Beyond that there remain merely differences of judgement about details in employing the concept. Since these differences relate to details and not to essentials, even the most zealous friends of the organic concept are satisfied that it can now take care of itself. They are content to assume that it is taken for granted, and their interest is transferred to other fields (Small 1898: 412).

A couple of years earlier, the same reviewer, Albion W. Small, had also expressed an optimistic outlook for organicism. Discussing both Lilienfeld's and Schäffle's uses of society–organism analogies, Small wrote

the tracing of these analogies is not the essence of sociology, but merely the most vivid method of presenting the phenomena of society in such form that the actual problems of sociology will appear. The analogies and terms suggested by them are tools of research and report, not solutions of problems.... The metaphors emphasize obvious analogies between social relations and physiological relations. They are used as spurs to scientific curiosity, so as to facilitate discovery of the limits of analogy, and thus of the distinctively social phenomena (Small 1896: 311).

An earlier critic, however, was not so sanguine. Émile Durkheim rejected Lilienfeld's ideas on both ideological and methodological grounds. Ideologically, Durkheim objected that one could find in Lilienfeld's Gedanken, "the transformationist [evolutionary] hypothesis reconciled with the dogma of the Holy Trinity" (Durkheim 1887a: 21 [online version]) Methodologically, Durkheim stated that "the sole object of Lilienfeld’s work is to show the analogies between societies and organisms," thus missing the point of seeing "in moral phenomena sui generis facts necessitating study in themselves, for themselves, by a special method" (Durkheim 1887b: 16 [online version], note 17)

Reviewing Lilienfeld's main French exposition of his ideas, La Pathologie Sociale, Franklin H. Giddings a few years later echoed Durkheim's criticism:

In the work of Dr. von Lilienfeld we have the first opportunity to judge whether the biological conception of society can throw any new light on practical social questions. That "the body politic" is subject to "disease" is a very ancient notion. But is anything gained by taking a figure of speech literally and converting analogy into identity? Dr. von Lilienfeld’s pages are rich in learning and in wisdom. He has investigated thoroughly and thought deeply; and no one can dip into his chapters without being impressed with the value of his reflections on the economic inequalities, the political corruption, the moral degeneration, the educational imbecilities, the religious indifference of the present day. A thousand hints are thrown out by the way on which statesmen and reformers might well reflect. But there is nothing in the entire book that could not have been better said in a simpler language than that of an ingeniously elaborated "social pathology." To describe fads and crazes, degeneracy, outbreaks of insanity, crime and lubricity, as "anomalies of the social nervous system," is only calculated to hasten the wear and tear of the nervous systems of individuals; and to argue that wealth is a "social intercellular substance," is simply to set up a doctrine of sociological transubstantiation (Giddings 1896: 348).

=== Social Darwinist? ===
In addition to being labelled an organicist sociologist, or simply organicist, Lilienfeld has also been classified as "a systematic Social Darwinist and laissez-faire advocate" (Weikart 1993: 479), who "considered war a natural phenomenon necessitated by Malthusian population pressure and the resultant struggle for existence" (Weikart 1993: 481–482). Lilienfeld did not, however, deny "the propriety of laws ensuring honesty in business competition" (Weikart 1993: 479).

Lilienfeld's advocacy of fair business practices is not anomalous, given his thoughts concerning the importance of society on forming the individual:

If man, from the physical point of view, is first of all a product of nature, he is, from the point of view of intelligence, above all a product of society. The most important organs of the nervous system form, develop, differentiate, and integrate under the influence of the social milieu, just as the purely physical part of man is formed and developed under the influence of the physical milieu by the natural differentiation and integration of forces. The economic activity of society, work, customs, habits, laws, political liberty, authority, religion, science, art, in short, all of social life, forms and educates man, gives to his efforts, to his intellectual, moral and aesthetic needs, this or that direction, pushing in this or that sense the complete development of the superior organs of the nervous system (Lilienfeld 1873; cited in Schmoller 1902: 169, note 81).

Indeed, the organic theory of society of Lilienfeld and Worms would seem to be an antidote to rampant laissez-faire competition, as Barberis (2003) noted:

Organicism also reacted to a widely held political idea of the time: that individualism had been taken to extremes in modern society and that it was necessary to bring balance through an opposite emphasis. Against the self-sufficient individual of the Declaration of the Rights of Man, the organicists claimed to bring the support of science to the primacy of the social bond. For these authors, the natural human state was that of association. As Worms put it in a critique of the contract theory: "Men did not need to associate themselves, they were born associated, and they remained so." Psychological and moral capacities developed through this association; in other words, humans owed their consciousness and their capacity for relative autonomy to society. Individuality as it was known and prized in modern society was a product of society. Lilienfeld stated this as a simple fact: "The intellectual and moral faculties of man are exclusively the product of social life." The organicists believed this should settle the conflict between individual liberty and social solidarity; humans would come to realize their strict dependence on the collective (Barberis 2003: 62).

Lilienfeld did, however, have a progressivist understanding of evolutionary complexity similar to Spencer's:

The direction of progress is indicated by Lilienfeld's hierarchical potentiation of forces, which in the order of their natural succession in the advancement of society represent the following order: mechanical, chemical, organic, emotional, intellectual, and social. Each of these is based upon and is the outgrowth of the preceding (Meyer 1900: 25).

Human society represented the highest level of Lilienfeld's hierarchy, the highest level of organic life, such that only in human societies does nature display full autonomy: an autonomy both of wholes and of parts (Lilienfeld 1896b: 88; cited in Capozzi 2004: 93).

== See also ==
- List of Baltic German scientists

== Notes and references ==
=== References ===
- [Anonymous.] (1878). New Books. [Notice of: Gedanken über die Socialwissenschaft der Zukunft. Von Paul v. Lilienfeld. 3 bde. Mitau: Behre, 1873–7. Pp. 399, 455, 484.] Mind, vol. 3, no. 9, p. 152.
- [Anonymous.] (1880). New Books. [Notice of: Gedanken über die Socialwissenschaft der Zukunft. Von Paul V. Lilienfeld. Vierter Theil: "Die sociale Physiologie". Mitau: Behre, 1879. Pp. 496.] Mind, vol. 5, no. 18, p. 298.
- [Anonymous.] (1897). Scientific notes and news. Science, New Series, vol. 6, no. 138, August 20, 1897, pp. 287–293.
- Barberis, D. S. (2003). In search of an object: Organicist sociology and the reality of society in fin-de-siècle France. History of the Human Sciences, vol 16, no. 3, pp. 51–72.
- Capozzi, R. (2004). La possibilità come metodo della ragione: La logica dell’analogia nelle scienze sociali. InterConoscenza—Rivista di psicologia, psicoterapia e scienze cognitive, vol. 2, no. 1, pp. 1–155.
- Durkheim, E. (1887a). La philosophie dans les universités allemandes. Revue internationale de l’enseignement, vol. 13, pp. 313–338 and 423–440. doi:10.1522/cla.due.phi
- Durkheim, E. (1887b). La science positive de la morale en Allemagne. Revue philosophique, vol. 24, pp. 33–142 and 275–284. doi:10.1522/cla.due.sci2
- Geiger, R. L. (1981). René Worms, l’organicisme et l’organisation de la sociologie. Revue Française de Sociologie, vol. 22, no. 3, pp. 345–360.
- Gerschenkron, A. (1974). Figures of speech in social sciences. Proceedings of the American Philosophical Society, vol. 118, no. 5, pp. 431–448.
- Giddings, F. H. (1896). [Review of: Organisme et société, by R. Worms; La pathologie sociale, by P. de Lilienfeld; Les lois de l’imitation: Étude sociologique and La logique sociale, by G. Tarde; De la division du travail social and Les règles de la méthode sociologique, by E. Durkheim; Psychologie des foules, by G. Le Bon; Le transformisme social, by G. De Greef; La cité moderne: Métaphysique de la sociologie, by J. Izoulet; Les sciences sociales en Allemagne: Les méthodes actuelles, by C. Bouglé; and Annales de l’Institut International de Sociologie. I: Travaux du Premier Congrès.] Political Science Quarterly, vol. 11, pp. 346–352.
- Meyer, B. H. (1900). Four synthesists: Cross-sections from Comte, Spencer, Lilienfeld, and Schaeffle. American Journal of Sociology, vol. 6, no. 1, pp. 20–28.
- Reinert, S. (2003). Darwin and the Body Politic: Schäffle, Veblen, and the Shift of Biological Metaphor in Economics. Othercanon.org.
- Revue Internationale de Sociologie. (1893–1905). Founded in 1893 by René Worms. Volumes 1–13 available at the Bibliothèque Nationale de France's Gallica site [volume 6 from 1898 appears to be missing or not yet digitized].
- Schmoller, G. (1902). Politique sociale et économie politique (Questions fondamentales). Paris: V. Giard et E. Brière. doi:10.1522/24851476
- Small, A. W. (1896). [Review of: Bau und Leben des socialen Körpers. Von Dr. A. Schäffle. Zweite Auflage. Erster Band; Allgemeine Sociologie, pp. xiv + 571. Zweiter Band; Spezielle Sociologie, pp. vii + 656. Tübingen: Verlag der H. Laupp’schen Buchhandlung, 1896.] American Journal of Sociology, vol. 2, no. 2, pp. 310–315.
- Small, A. W. (1898). [Review of: Annales de l'Institut International de Sociologie, Tome IV.] American Journal of Sociology, vol. 4, no. 3, pp. 411–412.
- Ward, L. F. (1897). [Review of: Organisme et Société, by René Worms; and La Pathologie Sociale, by Paul de Lilienfeld.] American Journal of Sociology, vol. 3, no. 2, pp. 258–265.
- Weikart, R. (1993). The origins of Social Darwinism in Germany, 1859–1895. Journal of the History of Ideas, vol. 54, pp. 469–488.
- Worms, R. (1895). Notes. Le second Congrès de l’Institut International de Sociologie. Revue Internationale de Sociologie, 3^{e} Année, N^{o} 10, Octobre 1895, pp. 876–882.
- Worms, R. (1896). Organisme et société. Bibliothèque Sociologique Internationale, I. Paris: V. Giard et E. Brière. Bibliothèque nationale de France, Gallica.
- Worms, R. (1897). Notes. Le troisième congrès de l’Institut International de Sociologie. Revue Internationale de Sociologie, 5^{e} Année, N^{os} 8–9, Août–Septembre 1897, pp. 657–661.
- Worms, R. (1898). [Miscellany:] Third Congress of the International Institute of Sociology, Held at Paris, July 21–24, 1897. Translated by Samuel McCune Lindsay. Annals of the American Academy of Political and Social Science, vol. 11, January 1898, pp. 109–112.
- Worms, R. (1903). Paul de Lilienfeld. Revue Internationale de Sociologie, 11^{e} Année, N^{o} 4, Avril 1903, pp. 265–267.

=== Works by Paul von Lilienfeld ===
- (1860). Основные начала политической экономии. (Osnovnie nachala politicheskoi economii.) [Elements of political economy.] (Published under the pseudonym Лилеев (Lileev). ru:Лилиенфельд-Тоаль, Павел Фёдорович
- (1868). Земля и воля. (Zemlia i volia.) [Land and liberty.] LCCN 19-13807
- (1872). Мысли о социальной науке будущего. (Mysli o sotsial’noi naukie budushchego.) [Thoughts on the social science of the future.] LCCN 20-23989
- (1873–1881). Gedanken über die Socialwissenschaft der Zukunft. [Thoughts on the social science of the future.] Mitau: E. Behre. (Reissued by G. Reimer, Berlin, 1901.) LCCN 04-3289 [Bibliothèque nationale de France notice: FRBNF30819404] Volumes 1–3. Internet Archive.
  - I. Die menschliche Gesellschaft als realer Organismus. [Human society as real organism.] (1873).
  - II. Die socialen Gesetze. [The laws of society.] (1875). (Reprinted as Gedanken über die Sozialwissenschaft der Zukunft: Teil 2: Die sozialen Gesetze (Paperback), by Adamant Media, 2003, ISBN 0-543-81761-X.)
  - III. Die sociale Psychophysik. [Social psychophysics.] (1877).
  - IV. Die sociale Physiologie. [Social physiology.] (1879).
  - V. Die Religion, betrachtet vom Standpunkte der realgenetischen Socialwissenschaft, oder versuch einer natürlichen Theologie. [Religion considered from the viewpoint of the real genetic social science, or attempt at a natural theology.] (1881).
- (1894). La Pathologie sociale (Première Partie). Revue Internationale de Sociologie, 2^{e} Année, N^{o} 12, Décembre 1894, pp. 825–859.
- (1895). [The method of induction applied to social phenomena.] Annales de l’Institut International de Sociologie, I. Travaux du premier Congrès, tenu à Paris, October, 1894. Paris: V. Giard et E. Brière.
- (1896a). L’organismo sociale è un superorganismo? Estratta dalla Riforma Sociale, Fasc. 3, anno III, vol. VI. Torino: R. Frassati. Call Number: H W211 28
- (1896b). La pathologie sociale. [Social pathology.] Avec une préface de René Worms. Bibliothèque Sociologique Internationale, II. Paris: V. Giard et E. Brière. LCCN 09-20785 [Bibliothèque nationale de France notice: FRBNF30819405] Bibliothèque nationale de France, Gallica.
- (1896c). [Review of: René Worms. Organisme et Société. Paris, 1896; 1 vol. in-8^{o}, 410 pages.] Revue Internationale de Sociologie, 4^{e} Année, N^{o} 7, Juillet 1896, pp. 563–566.
- (1896d). Y a-t-il une loi de l’evolution des formes politiques? [Is there a law of the evolution of political forms?] Annales de l’Institut International de Sociologie, II. Travaux du second Congrès, tenu à Paris en Sep.-Oct., 1895. Publiées sous la direction de René Worms, Secrétaire Général. Paris: V. Giard et E. Brière.
- (1897). La méthode graphique en sociologie. [The graphical method in sociology.] Annales de l’Institut International de Sociologie, III. Paris: V. Giard et E. Brière. Call Number: H L62m
- (1898a). La théorie organique des sociétés. [The organic theory of societies.] Annales de l’Institut International de Sociologie, IV. Contenant les travaux du troisième congrès tenu à Paris en juillet 1897. Paris: V. Giard et E. Brière, pp 196–236.
- (1898b). Über Socialphilosophie. [On social philosophy.] In Anknüpfung an das Werk von Dr. Ludwig Stein: Die social Frage im Lichte der Philosophie. [Pertaining to the work of Dr. Ludwig Stein: Social questions in the light of philosophy.] Berlin: G. Reimer, pp. 109–113. Call Number: H W211 28
- (1898c). Zur Vertheidigung der organischen Methode in der Sociologie. [In defense of the organic method in sociology.] Berlin: G. Reimer. LCCN 33-16634 [Bibliothèque nationale de France notice: FRBNF30819406]

=== Further reading ===
- Clark, L. L. (1984) Social Darwinism in France. Tuscaloosa: University of Alabama Press.
- Cohen, I. B., ed. (1994). The Natural Sciences and the Social Sciences : Some Critical and Historical Perspectives. Dordrecht and Boston: Kluwer Academic.
- Eubank, E. E. (1937). Errors of sociology. Social Forces, vol. 16, no. 2, pp. 178–201.
- Odum, H. W. (1937). The errors of sociology. Social Forces, vol. 15, no. 3, pp. 327–342.
- Padovan, D. (2000). The concept of social metabolism in classical sociology. Revista Theomai, no. 2. pdf file
