= Molinari =

Molinari is an Italian language occupational surname for a miller. Notable people with this surname include:

- Adriana Molinari (born 1967), Argentine-American pornographic actress
- Alberto Molinari (born 1965), Italian actor, producer, and director
- Alessandro Molinari (1898–1962), Italian, the first General Director of ISTAT
- Alexander Molinari (1772—1831), German-born portrait painter of Italian ancestry
- Anna Molinari, Italian fashion designer, founder of Blumarine and other brands in the Blufin group
- Antonio Molinari (bishop) (1626–1698), Roman Catholic Bishop of Lettere-Gragnano
- Antonio Molinari (runner) (born 1967), Italian male mountain runner
- Bernardino Molinari (1880–1951), Italian composer and conductor
- Carlos Molinari, Argentine businessman and real-estate developer
- Caroline Molinari (born 1986), Brazilian female artistic gymnast
- Cecilia Molinari (born 1949), former Italian sprinter
- Dave Molinari (born 1955), American sports journalist
- Edoardo Molinari (born 1981), Italian professional golfer and brother of Francesco Molinari
- Elisa Molinari (born 1958), Italian academic, Fellow of the American Physical Society
- Emilio Molinari (1939–2025), Italian politician
- Ettore Molinari (1867–1926), Italian chemist and anarchist
- Federico Molinari (footballer) (born 1979), Argentine footballer
- Federico Molinari (gymnast) (born 1984), Argentine male artistic gymnast and part of the national team
- Forrest Molinari (born 1995), American freestyle wrestler
- Francesca Molinari, Italian economist
- Francesco Molinari (born 1982), Italian professional golfer and brother of Edoardo Molinari
- Francesco Molinari-Pradelli (1911–1996), Italian opera conductor
- Giuseppe Molinari (born 1938), Roman Catholic Archbishop of L'Aquila
- Guido Molinari (1933–2004), Canadian artist
- Gustave de Molinari (1819–1912), Belgian economist
- Guy Molinari (1928–2018), American politician and father of Susan Molinari
- Jean Baptiste Molinari, French head chef
- Jean-Claude Molinari (1931–1999), French tennis player
- Jim Molinari (born 1954), American basketball coach and lawyer
- Karl-Theodor Molinari (1915–1993), officer in the German Army and later in the Bundeswehr
- Luciano Molinari (1880–1940), Italian stage and film actor
- Luigi Molinari (1866–1919), Italian anarchist and lawyer, publisher of the periodical L'Università popolare
- Luis Molinari (1929–1994), Ecuadorian artist
- Madeo "Moon" Molinari 1920–2011), American athlete and sports coach
- Manlio Molinari (born 1964), retired Sammarinese athlete
- Maurizio Molinari (born 1964), Italian journalist
- Michelino Molinari da Besozzo (c. 1370 – c. 1455), Italian painter and illuminator
- Morris Molinari (born 1975), former Italian football defender
- Renato Molinari (1946–2024), Italian powerboat racer
- Ricardo Molinari (1898–1996), Argentine poet
- S. Robert Molinari (1897–1957), American politician from New York
- Simona Molinari (born 1983), Italian jazz music singer
- Stefano Molinari (born 2000), Italian professional footballer
- Susan Molinari (born 1958), American politician and daughter of Guy Molinari
- Tina Molinari (born 1956), Canadian politician
- Vito Molinari (1929–2025), Italian stage and film director

== See also ==
- Molinari (design), an Italian furniture and home interior company
