= Worms family =

The Worms family is a family from Frankfurt and England, tracing its descent from Aaron Worms of Frankfurt am Main in the middle of the eighteenth century. Aaron's great-great-grandson was created hereditary baron of the Austrian empire on April 23, 1871, and a later descendant, Baron Henry de Worms, was raised to the British peerage as Lord Pirbright.

== Members ==
- René Worms, French auditor of the Conseil d'État, sociologist, founder of the Institut International de Sociologie in 1893.
- Eleazar ben Judah ben Kalonymus of Worms (c. 1176–1238), Talmudist and Kabbalist
- Henry de Worms, 1st Baron Pirbright, English statesman ()
- Jacqueline Worms de Romilly (aka Jacqueline de Romilly), French philosopher, see French article
