= Teresa Borràs i Fornell =

Catalan composer and pianist (1923–2010)

Teresa Borrás Fornell (July 30, 1923 in Manresa – July 18, 2010 in Mataró) was a Catalan composer, music teacher and pianist.

== Biography ==
Borràs began her musical studies at age eight at the Liceo Conservatory in Barcelona, where she studied piano, harmony and guitar. Teachers she studied with included Molinari, Agosti and Vito Frazzi. Later she studied harmony, counterpoint and composition with Cristòfor Taltabul.

In 1950 she received a scholarship to study at the Accademia Chigiana of Siena (Italy), and received the scholarship again two years later. At this Academy, she received a grant to study master classes in composition and later studied two courses of Frazzi harpsichord in the Conservatory of Barcelona. In Siena she learned to play unusual instruments like the harpsichord and the harp, which added to her knowledge of piano and guitar.

In 1979 she was awarded the Summer School Fellowship for Composition "Music in Compostela" in the class of Rodolfo Halffter. In 1997 she was awarded the "Caterina Albert i Paradis" prize. Between 1947 and 1953, she was a concert pianist. For seven years she was professor of piano and guitar at the Municipal Music School of Manresa, was also a professor of piano and harmony at the Music School of Mataró (subsidiary of the Lyceum) and later a professor at the Institute Alexandre Satorras.

Borràs released three albums of recorded works. Her compositions are unconventional in style, characterized by a unique combination of instruments and original structure. After retiring from academic life, Teresa Borràs continued composing and playing as a concert pianist.

== Work ==
Selected works include:

- Six Preludes Op. 67-13, 21 minutes, Piano, premiered at T. Borràs
- Ten Confluences Op. 75, Piano premiere: T. Borràs
- Six Studies Op. 76. 14 minutes, (1983) Piano, premiered at T. Borràs. Barcelona, 1985.
- Scherzetto (1979) 4 minutes, Piano premiere: T. Borràs.
- Toccata Op. 77 6 minutes 2 seconds, Piano, premiered at T. Borràs.
- Cloud Op. 83 (1983) 5 minutes 1 seconds, Piano.
- Far (1983) 2 minutes 02 seconds, Piano premiere: T. Borràs.
- Sardana (1985) 2 minutes, Piano premiere: T. Borràs
- 1,2,3 Preludes (1970) Op 46, 35 minutes, Harp.
- Three Danzas Españolas Op.48 (1970) Harp, 20 minutes, premiere, Madrid 1995.
- Landscape (1972) Op. 53 6 minutes, Harp
- Six Danzas (1954) Guitar Op. 7, 20 minutes, premiere: Alaska University, 1993.
- Six Studies oboe solo (1993).
- Tiento (1993) Op. 125. Guitar.5.
- Two pieces for Carillon, Carillon 12 minutes, premiere: Carillon
- Generalitat.1994.
- Trio (1992) 14 Op. 112 flute, clarinet, bassoon.
- Morning (Sardana) 8. Op.113. clarinet, basset-horn, piano. Release: Trio Werher Barcelona.
- Cuttings (1995) Op. 141-8. 2 trumpets, 2 trombones.
- Labyrinth (.129 1994 Op. , 6 minutes, bassoon, piano.
- Quartet (1991) Op. 103 12 minutes, 2 violins, viola, cello.
- Five Thumbnails Op. 142 (1995) 12 minutes, 4 clarinets
- Concerto Op. 64 (1975) 25 minutes, 2 solo flute, string orchestra, premiered *Chamber Orchestra Engelberg. Peñíscola 1990.
- Concerto Op. 65 (1976) 25 minutes, solo bassoon, string orchestra.
- Rondo (1990) Op. 100, 10 minutes, String orchestra. Premiere: Chamber Orchestra of the Emporda, Barcelona
- Oreo Op. 29 (1967) Sardana, premiere: Barcelona (Barcelona verse 1973)
- Burriac Op. 30 (1967) Sardana, premiere: Barcelona.
- Concerto Op. 106 (1992) 22 minutes, solo viola and string orchestra.
- Concerto Op. 116 (1994) 20 minutes, solo English horn and string orchestra.
- Concerto Op. 122 (1993) 16 minutes 1 second, clarinet and basset-horn soloist, orchestra Cora.
