= Gaetano Pietra =

Italian statistician

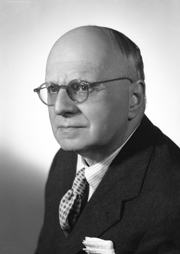

Gaetano Pietra (10 August 1879, in Castiglione delle Stiviere, Italy – 1961, in Villanova dello Iudrio, Udine, Italy) was an Italian statistician.

== Life and career ==
Gaetano Pietra was a professor at the University of Ferrara. In 1927, he founded and directed the School of Statistics of the University of Padua. He was formerly the director of the Institute of Statistics in the Superior School of Commerce in Venice as well as a member of the Superior Council for Statistics. He defined statistical training as “the formation of a mental habitus suitable to quantitive analysis and the analysis of mass problems” and left no doubt as to his view of the hierarchy among the kinds of knowledge that were required for the administration of the state, since “in a structured economic system, economic theory as well as economic policy resolve themselves into economic statistics." Gaetano Pietra also played an important role in the organization of supplies during World War I before dedicating himself to scientific statistics, held an official position (as president of the political sciences and law faculties at the University of Padua) until the regime’s fall in July 1943. In April 1945, he was appointed vice-commissar, and from January 1946, president of Udine’s Chamber of Commerce, Industry, and Agriculture. He was also elected to the Senate for the Demo Christian party in 1948-1953. He founded the Italian Statistical Society and he was its president.

== Research Interests ==
Variability and concentration measures, concordance between cyclical series.

== Education ==
Degree in Law, University of Padua.

== Academic Positions ==
Full professor of statistics at the University of Padua and Ferrara (up to 1949), member of the Istituto interno di Statistica, member of the Istituto veneto di scienze lettere ed arti. Founder and president of the Italian Statistical Society.

== Honours and awards ==
President of Udine’s Chamber of Commerce, Industry, and Agriculture. Senator for the Demo Christian party in 1948-1953. Emeritus Professor at the University of Padua.

== Known for ==
He provided important and original contributions to the relationships between variability and concentration, and concordance between cyclical series.

== Publications ==
- Sulla misura della concentrazione e della variabilità dei caratteri, Roma, (1914);
- Sulla teoria della variabilità delle serie statistiche, Roma, (1915);
- Appunti intorno alla misura della variabilità e della concentrazione dei caratteri, Roma, (1915);
- The theory of statistical relation with special reference to cyclical series, Roma, (1925);
- Dell’interpretazione parabolica nel caso in cui entrambi I valori delle variabili sono affetti da errori accidentali, Roma, (1932);
- Lezioni di statistica, Padova, (1935);
- Di una formula per il calcolo delle medie combinatorie, Bologna, (1938);
- La statistica metodologica e la scuola italiana, Pisa, (1939);
- Discordanze tra medie. Ancora sul metodo dei profili. La curva di Lorenz, Ferrara, (1939);
- Studi di statistica metodologica, Milano, (1948).

== Link ==
https://sites.google.com/site/dizionariosis/dizionario-statistico/statistici-n-o-p/pietra-gaetano http://www.treccani.it/enciclopedia/gaetano-pietra/
