= Italian Unionist Movement =

Italian political party

Italian Unionist Movement Movimento Unionista Italiano
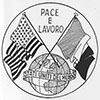
- Leader: Ugo Damiani
- Founded: 12 October 1944
- Dissolved: 31 January 1948
- Headquarters: Rome, Italy
- Youth wing: Gioventù Unionista Italiana
- Ideology: Americanism; Atlanticism; Liberal conservatism Federalism
- Political position: Centre-right
- International affiliation: World Federalist Movement

The Italian Unionist Movement (Italian: Movimento Unionista Italiano) was a short-lived Italian political party and federalist movement affiliated with the World Federalist Movement in New York that advocated for Italy to become part of the United States.

The party was founded on 12 October (Columbus Day) 1944 by sociologist Ugo Damiani, Calabrian activist Santi Paladino and ISTAT researcher Corrado Gini. The party emblem featured a globe with the American flag and Italian flag and the words "Peace and work" (Pace e lavoro) and "United States of the World" (Stati Uniti del Mondo). According to the three men, the government of the United States should annex all free and democratic nations worldwide, beginning with Italy, thereby transforming itself into a federal world government, and allowing Washington, D.C. to maintain Earth in a perpetual condition of peace. Paladino stated, "With a federation of the United States, Italy and some other nations, and a lot of atomic bombs, there would be no wars. This would solve all of Italy's problems." Paladino argued that a closer union with the United States was necessary to counter the advance of communism under Soviet leadership.

In January 1946, the party established a youth section known as the "Italian Unionist Youth" (Gioventù Unionista Italiana). According to Noel Rawnsley—Chairman of The Federalists at the time—the Italian Unionist Movement was regarded as "the largest federalist organization in the world". The youth section was intended to "awaken in the minds of the young a lively sense of the brotherhood of man", advocating for federalist principles, democracy, and international collaboration. It was also resolved "to remain outside of all political competition, determined to adhere strictly to the principles of true democracy and in open opposition to every form of dictatorship". By focusing on youth engagement, the party sought to advance its vision of Italian alignment with the United States and a broader global federation.

After some success in local elections in Southern Italy in 1946, the party ran in the 1946 Italian general election, the first general elections held in Italy after the fall of fascism. The party's results were very poor, receiving only 0.3% of votes, with only Ugo Damiani being elected as a deputy in the Constituent Assembly. As MP, Damiani supported federalistic ideas, but the main goal of the party was evidently impossible to reach. As the American government did not support the party or its project, the movement was disbanded in 1948.

== Italian Parliament ==
Chamber of Deputies
Election year	Votes	%	Seats	+/−	Leader
1946	71,021 (13th)	0.31	1 / 556	–	Ugo Damiani
