= Italian Statistical Society =

Italian scientific society

- Società italiana di statistica
- Abbreviation: SIS
- Formation: 15 January 1939; 87 years ago
- Type: Non-profit scientific society
- Purpose: To promote the development of statistical sciences and their applications
- Location: Italy
- Members: Over 1,000
- Official language: Italian, English
- President: Marcello Chiodi
- Publication: SIS - Informazioni; Statistica & Società; Induzioni; Statistical Methods & Applications
- Affiliations: International Statistical Institute (ISI); International Association of Classification Societies (IFCS)
- Website: sis-statistica.it

The Italian Statistical Society (Italian: Società italiana di statistica; SIS) is a scientific society established on 15 January 1939 as a non-profit juridical person by 42 founding members who approved the first statute with the fundamental aim of promoting the development of statistical sciences and their applications in economic, social, health, demographic, technological, productive, and many other fields of research. The Society carries out this task, assigned to it by the statute, through the organization of scientific meetings and conferences, publications, and collaborations with similar bodies at the national and international level.

== Description ==
Since its establishment, the Society has grown in step with the rapid spread of quantitative methods of data analysis in all areas of scientific research and social life.

The Italian Statistical Society maintains scientific collaborations with numerous foreign statistical societies, is affiliated with the International Statistical Institute (ISI), is a member of the International Association of Classification Societies (IFCS) through the SIS Section for Classification and Data Analysis (CLADAG), and supports the European Courses in Advanced Statistics (ECAS) program.

The Italian Statistical Society publishes a monthly information sheet, SIS - Informazioni, and the online journal Statistica & Società, as well as supporting the publication of the journal Induzioni, which is dedicated to teaching.

Statistical Methods & Applications is the scientific journal of the Society, printed in English by the publishing house Springer Verlag, created primarily with the aim of disseminating the main scientific works of the Italian school of statistics to other countries.

Over a thousand members belong to SIS, the majority (about ninety percent) of whom are statisticians (Members, many of whom are university professors), and the remainder are entities and societies such as the Italian National Institute of Statistics (Istat), the Bank of Italy, the Guglielmo Tagliacarne Institute, some chambers of commerce, some large Italian municipalities, as well as Italian ministries.

The presidents of the SIS have been:

- Gaetano Pietra (1939–1941)
- Corrado Gini (1941–1945, 1949–1965)
- Luigi Galvani (1945–1949)
- Paolo Fortunati (1967–1980)
- Giuseppe Leti (1980–1988)
- Alberto Zuliani (1988–1992)
- Alfredo Rizzi (1992–1996)
- Luigi Biggeri (1996–2000)
- Benito V. Frosini (2000–2004)
- Daniela Cocchi (2004–2008)
- Maurizio Vichi (2008–2012)
- Nicola Torelli (2012–2016)
- Monica Pratesi (2016–2020)
- Corrado Crocetta (2020–2024)
- Marcello Chiodi (2024 to present)

== See also ==
- Italian National Institute of Statistics
- International Statistical Institute
- Royal Statistical Society
- Italian society of economics demography and statistics
- Statistical Methods & Applications
