= Organicism =

Conception of society as a living organism

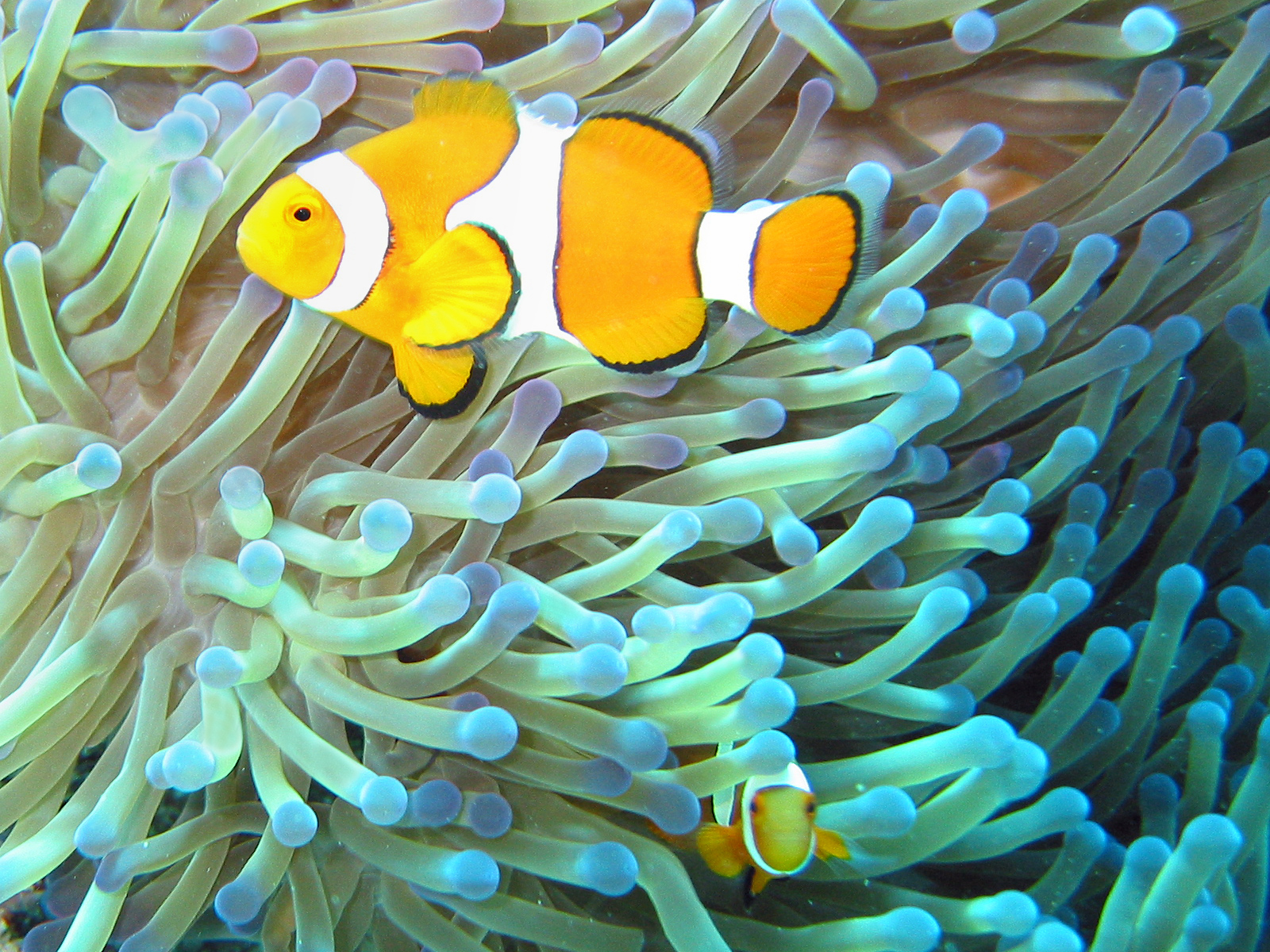
Common Clownfish (Amphiprion ocellaris) in their Magnificent Sea Anemone (Heteractis magnifica) home on the Great Barrier Reef, Australia

Organicism is the philosophical position that states that the universe and its various parts (including human societies) ought to be considered alive and naturally ordered, much like a living organism. Vital to the position is the idea that organicistic elements are not dormant "things" per se but rather dynamic components in a comprehensive system that is, as a whole, everchanging. Organicism is related to but remains distinct from holism insofar as it prefigures holism; while the latter concept is applied more broadly to universal part-whole interconnections such as in anthropology and sociology, the former is traditionally applied only in philosophy and biology. Furthermore, organicism is incongruous with reductionism because of organicism's consideration of "both bottom-up and top-down causation". Regarded as a fundamental tenet in natural philosophy, organicism has remained a vital current in modern thought, alongside both reductionism and mechanism, that has guided scientific inquiry since the early 17th century.

Though there remains dissent among scientific historians concerning organicism's pregeneration, most scholars agree on Ancient Athens as its birthplace. Surfacing in Athenian writing in the 4th-century BC, Plato was among the first philosophers to consider the universe an intelligent living (almost sentient) being, which he posits in his Philebus and Timaeus. At the turn of the 18th-century, Immanuel Kant championed a revival of organicisitic thought by stressing, in his written works, "the inter-relatedness of the organism and its parts[,] and the circular causality" inherent to the inextricable entanglement of the greater whole.

Organicism flourished for a period during the German romanticism intellectual movement and was a position considered by Friedrich Wilhelm Joseph Schelling to be an important principle in the burgeoning field of biological studies. Within contemporary biology, organicism stresses the organization (particularly the self-organizing properties) rather than the composition (the reduction into biological components) of organisms. John Scott Haldane was the first modern biologist to use the term to expand his philosophical stance in 1917; other 20th-century academics and professionals, such as Theodor Adorno and Albert Dalcq, have followed in Haldane's wake.

Properly scientific interest in organicist biology has recently been revived with the extended evolutionary synthesis.

== In philosophy ==
Organicism as a doctrine rejects mechanism and reductionism (doctrines that claim that the smallest parts by themselves explain the behavior of larger organized systems of which they are a part). However, organicism also rejects vitalism, the doctrine that there is a vital force different from physical forces that accounts for living things. As Fritjof Capra puts it, both schools, organicism and vitalism, were born from the quest for getting rid of the Cartesian picture of reality, a view that has been claimed to be the most destructive paradigm nowadays, from science to politics. A number of biologists in the early to mid-twentieth century embraced organicism. They wished to reject earlier vitalisms but also to stress that whole organism biology was not fully explainable by atomic mechanism. The larger organization of an organic system has features that must be taken into account to explain its behavior.

The French zoologist Yves Delage, in his seminal text L'Hérédité Et Les Grands Problèmes de la Biologie Générale, described organicism thus:

[L]ife, the form of the body, the properties and characters of its diverse parts, as resulting from the reciprocal play or struggle of all its elements, cells, fibres, tissues, organs, which act the one on the other, modify one the other, allot among them each its place and part, and lead all together to the final result, giving thus the appearance of a consensus, or a pre-established harmony, where in reality there is nothing but the result of independent phenomena.

Scott F. Gilbert and Sahotra Sarkar distinguish organicism from holism to avoid what they see as the vitalistic or spiritualistic connotations of holism. Val Dusek notes that holism contains a continuum of degrees of the top-down control of organization, ranging from monism (the doctrine that the only complete object is the whole universe, or that there is only one entity, the universe) to organicism, which allows relatively more independence of the parts from the whole, despite the whole being more than the sum of the parts, and/or the whole exerting some control on the behavior of the parts.

Still more independence is present in relational holism. This doctrine does not assert top-down control of the whole over its parts, but does claim that the relations of the parts are essential to explanation of behavior of the system. Aristotle and early modern philosophers and scientists tended to describe reality as made of substances and their qualities, and to neglect relations. Gottfried Wilhelm Leibniz showed the bizarre conclusions to which a doctrine of the non-existence of relations led. Twentieth century philosophy has been characterized by the introduction of and emphasis on the importance of relations, whether in symbolic logic, in phenomenology, or in metaphysics.

William Wimsatt has suggested that the number of terms in the relations considered distinguishes reductionism from holism. Reductionistic explanations claim that two or at most three term relations are sufficient to account for the system's behavior. At the other extreme the system could be considered as a single ten to the twenty-sixth term relation, for instance.

== In theology ==
Organicism as a structuring or worldview motif finds implementation in the dogmatic theology of the nineteenth century. It was implemented prominently by Dutch Reformed theologian Herman Bavinck, and has been variously debated and appraised. Nonetheless, Bavinck's consideration of reality as both being and becoming, with an organic unity-and-diversity rooted in the united essence of the Trinity, stands as a prominent example of a theological implementation of organicism.

Likewise, organicist language can be found in relation to faith and the church by Norwegian Lutheran theologian Gisle Johnson. Johnson construes the relationship between faith, church, and historical development as "an organic development", likening it to a sprout. For Gisle, systematic theology itself is an organic entity, a correlate of faith as principium cognoscendi where "the task is a systematic explication and reproduction of the content of faith-consciousness (Troesbevidsthedens), whereby the parts appear everywhere in their essential inner connection with the whole as an organism permeated and controlled by a definite principle."

Prior to both of these theologians, organicism played an important role in the dogmatic construction of Danish dogmatician Hans Lassen Martensen. It is Martensen who provides a helpful and concise definition of organicism in its theological implementation: “It is true only of lifeless, mechanical things (e.g., a ring or a chain), that the whole cannot be had without having all the parts. In living, organic objects, it is very possible to have the whole without having all the parts. But eternal life, and the things that belong to eternal life must, as all will allow, be considered as subject to the laws of life.”

As such, although implemented broadly between individual dogmaticians, organicism proves to provide a helpful conceptual common denominator, allow for a certain plasticity and malleability between concepts: for Bavinck, God and the world; for Gisle, faith and truth; and for Martensen, life and gospel.

== In politics and sociology ==
Organicism has also been used to characterize notions put forth by various late 19th-century social scientists who considered human society to be analogous to an organism, and individual humans to be analogous to the cells of an organism. This sort of organicist sociology was articulated by Alfred Espinas, Paul von Lilienfeld, Jacques Novicow, Albert Schäffle, Herbert Spencer, and René Worms, among others. Prominent conservative political thinkers who have developed an organic view of society are Edmund Burke, G.W.F. Hegel, Adam Müller, and Julius Evola. Organicism has also been identified with the "Tory Radicalism" of Thomas Carlyle, John Ruskin, Samuel Taylor Coleridge, and Benjamin Disraeli.

Thomas Hobbes arguably put forward a form of organicism. In the Leviathan, he argued that the state is like a secular God whose constituents (individual people) make up a larger organism. However, the body of the Leviathan is composed of many human faces (all looking outwards from the body), and these faces do not symbolize different organs of a complex organism but the individual people who themselves have consented to the social contract, and thereby ceded their power to the Leviathan. That the Leviathan is more like a constructed machine than like a literal organism is perfectly in line with Hobbes' elementaristic individualism and mechanical materialism.

According to scholars Jean-Yves Camus and Nicolas Lebourg, organicism stands at the core of the historical far-right's worldview. Adolf Hitler himself along with other members of the National Socialist German Workers' Party (German: Nationalsozialistische Deutsche Arbeiterpartei, NSDAP) in the Weimar Republic (1918–1933) were greatly influenced by several 19th- and early 20th-century thinkers and proponents of philosophical, onto-epistemic, and theoretical perspectives on ecological anthropology, scientific racism, holistic science, and organicism regarding the constitution of complex systems and theorization of organic-racial societies. In particular, one of the most significant ideological influences on the Nazis was the 19th-century German nationalist philosopher Johann Gottlieb Fichte, whose works had served as an inspiration to Hitler and other Nazi Party members, and whose ideas were implemented among the philosophical and ideological foundations of Nazi-oriented Völkisch nationalism.

== In biology ==
In breathing organisms, the cells were first observed in 17th-century Europe following the invention of the microscope. Before that period, individual organisms were studied as a whole in a field known as "organismic biology"; that area of research remains an important component of the biological sciences.

In biology, organicism considers that the observable structures of life, its overall form and the properties and characteristics of its component parts, are a result of the reciprocal play of all the components on each other. Examples of 20th-century biologists who were organicists are Ross Harrison, Paul Weiss, and Joseph Needham. Donna Haraway discusses them in her first book Crystals, Fabrics, and Fields. John Scott Haldane (father of J. B. S. Haldane), William Emerson Ritter, Edward Stuart Russell, Joseph Henry Woodger, Ludwig von Bertalanffy, and Ralph Stayner Lillie are other early 20th-century organicists. Robert Rosen, founder of "relational biology", provided a comprehensive mathematical and category-theoretic treatment of irreducible causal relations he believed to be responsible for life.

The early biologists of the organicist movement have influenced the organism-centered perspective of the extended evolutionary synthesis.

=== Theoretical Biology Club ===
In the early 1930s Joseph Henry Woodger and Joseph Needham, together with Conrad Hal Waddington, John Desmond Bernal, Dorothy Needham, and Dorothy Wrinch, formed the Theoretical Biology Club, to promote the organicist approach to biology. The club was in opposition to mechanistic philosophy, reductionism, and the gene-centric view of evolution. Most of the members were influenced by the philosophy of Alfred North Whitehead. The club disbanded as the Rockefeller Foundation refused to fund their investigations.

=== Ecology ===
In ecology, "organicism" and "organicistic" (or "organismic") are used to designate theories which conceptualize populations, particularly ecological communities or ecosystems, according to the model of the individual organism. As such, the term "organicism" is sometimes used interchangeably with "holism", although there are versions of holism that are not organicistic/organismic but individualistic.

Early iterations of Gaia theory took an explicitly organicist approach by conceptualizing the entire Earth as an integrated, self-regulating organic whole akin to a living being, rather than just a mechanical collection of separate components.

== See also ==
- Holistic community
- Hylozoism
- Mechanical and organic solidarity
- Organic unity
- Organismic theory
- Orthogenesis
- Philosophy of organism
- Structural functionalism
- Structuralism (biology)
