= Holistic community =

Ecosystem in which species are interdependent

A holistic community (also referred to as closed or unitary community) is an ecosystem where species within the community are interdependent, relying on each other to maintain the balance and stability of the system. These communities are described as working like one unit, meaning that every species plays an important part in the overall well-being of the ecosystem in which the community resides; much like the organelles within a cell, or even the cells making up one organism. Holistic communities have diffuse boundaries and an independent species range. Co-evolution is likely to be found in communities structured after this model, as a result of the interdependence and high rates of interaction found among the different populations. Species composition of communities change sharply at environmental edges (known as ecotones).

== Background ==
According to a widespread narrative, the ideas of a holistic ecological community were introduced by plant ecologist Frederic Clements in 1916, and countered by Henry Gleason in 1917, when he proposed the individualistic/open community concept (in applications to plants). However, this seems to be wrong in at least two essential respects:

- The concept of mutualistic organismic ecological community might firstly have been introduced by Eugenius Warming, a botanist and the main founder of the scientific discipline of ecology, who introduced the term "plantesamfund", plant community (Warming 1895). At the beginning of the section "Communal life of organism" of his later book Ecology of Plants (Warming and Vahl 1909), Warming clearly emphasizes the importance of mutual dependence among coexisting species: "The manifold, complex, mutual relations subsisting among organisms are matters of such profound import to plant-life and plant-communities that this Section of our book is set apart for their consideration" (ibid.: 82). "In plant communities there is, it is true, often (or always) a certain natural dependence or reciprocal influence of many species upon one another; they give rise to definite organized units of a higher order" (ibid.: 95).
- Undoubtedly, Clements compares plant communities with organisms and calls them "complex organisms" and, later, "super organisms" as well. "However, Clements's theory does not include the assumption that mutual dependence is a principle of the organisation of plant communities. Rather, he interprets plant communities as top-down control-hierarchical entities, in which the subordinate species depend on dominant species—but not the other way around. Therefore, his theory represents what may be called 'control-hierarchical organicism' as against 'mutualistic organicism'."

While Warming might have been the first to propose an organismic theory of ecological communities, one of the first to elaborate such a theory has been the limnologist, zoologist and ecologist August Thienemann. According to Thienemann, a biocoenosis "is not just an aggregate, a sum of organisms that coexist in the same biotope owing to alike exogenous habitat conditions but a (supra-individual) whole, a togetherness and a for-each-other of organisms" (Thienemann 1939: 275). He even assumes that the members of a biocoenosis feature "specific mutual relations that are vital for their life" (ibid.: 268), whereby this mutual "bond either exists directly from organism to organism or operates indirectly by the medium of vitally created modifications of the physiographic conditions of the biotope" (Thienemann 1941: 105).

Neither organismic nor individualistic communities have been found to exist in nature in entirety, both are theoretical concepts that can be applied to empirical communities. For example, a community's composition can be better explained by holism than individualism, or vice versa. This ecological concept is based on the broader concept of holism, which describes the functionality of any system as having many individual parts, all of which are extremely important to the system's viability.

"A community has been viewed as a super organism with integrity analogous to that of cells in an organism. This is the holistic or unitary view of a community, and one championed by Clements (1916). He regarded the community to be a highly integrated unit that operated very much within itself with little interaction with surrounding communities—a closed community."

"The holistic model considers all living beings as its subjects who are manifestations of the Absolute and part of the whole. It includes all relations that arise between them. The most efficient satisfaction of their interest is the most important designation of the holistic system (holistic community). The holistic community is equally responsible for the human development and for the harmonious evolution of all other subjects of holistic model. The subjects of holistic model are the following:

- Humankind
- Animals
- Plants
- Planet Earth
- Extraterrestrial beings
- Celestial bodies

This characteristic illustrates that the holistic model is universal and exceeds just human relations. It is not just humanistic but also respectful for all life in general. The necessity to identify the subjects in the frame of the whole is the first condition for the proper satisfaction of their interests. Without differentiating them and without knowing well how they function, it is impossible to conduct rational action which aims to fulfil the needs of everyone in the system and to refine their environment."

== See also ==
- Organicism
- Organic unity
- Systems ecology
