= Corrado Gini =

Italian statistician (1884–1965)

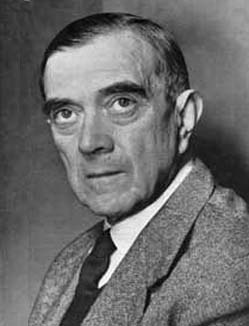
- Gini c. 1945
- Born: 23 May 1884; Motta di Livenza, Veneto, Kingdom of Italy
- Died: 13 March 1965 (aged 80); Rome, Italy
- Citizenship: Italian
- Education: University of Bologna
- Known for: Gini coefficient
- Scientific career
- Fields: Statistics; Demography; Sociology
- Workplaces: University of Cagliari; University of Padua; Sapienza University of Rome

Signature
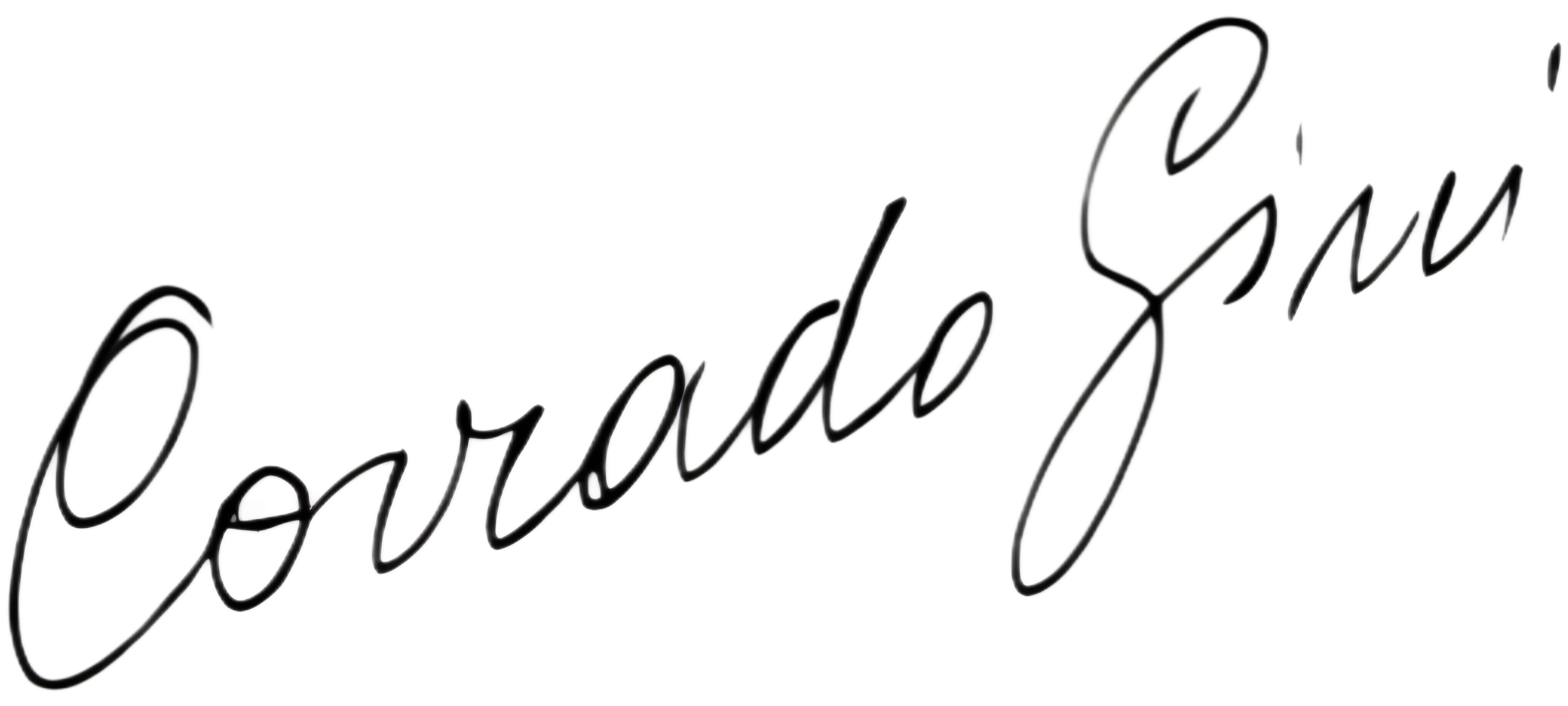

Corrado Gini (23 May 1884 – 13 March 1965) was an Italian statistician, demographer and sociologist who developed the Gini coefficient, a measure of the income inequality in a society. Gini was a proponent of organicism and applied it to nations. Gini was a eugenicist, and prior to and during World War II, he was an advocate of Italian Fascism. Following the war, he founded the Italian Unionist Movement, which advocated for the annexation of Italy by the United States.

== Career ==
Gini was born on 23 May 1884, in Motta di Livenza, near Treviso, into an old landed family. He entered the Faculty of Law at the University of Bologna, where, in addition to law, he studied mathematics, economics, and biology.

Gini's scientific work ran in two directions: towards the social sciences and towards statistics. His interests ranged well beyond the formal aspects of statistics, to the laws that govern biological and social phenomena.

His first published work was Il sesso dal punto di vista statistico (1908). This work is a thorough review of the natal sex ratio, looking at past theories and at how new hypotheses fit the statistical data. In particular, it presents evidence that the tendency to produce one or the other sex of child is, to some extent, heritable.

He published the Gini coefficient in the 1912 paper Variability and Mutability (Italian: Variabilità e mutabilità). Also called the Gini index and the Gini ratio, it is a measure of statistical dispersion intended to represent the income inequality within a nation or other group.

In 1910, he acceded to the Chair of Statistics in the University of Cagliari and then at Padua in 1913.

He founded the international journal of statistics Metron in 1920, directing it until his death; it only accepted articles with practical applications.

In 1920 became honorary member of the Royal Statistical Society.

He became a professor at the Sapienza University of Rome in 1925. At the University, he founded a lecture course on sociology, maintaining it until his retirement. He also set up the School of Statistics in 1928, and, in 1936, the Faculty of Statistical, Demographic and Actuarial Sciences.

== Under fascism ==
In 1926, he was appointed President of the Central Institute of Statistics in Rome. This he organised as a single centre for Italian statistical services. He was a close intimate of Mussolini throughout the 20s. He resigned from his position within the institute in 1932.

In 1926, he also founded the journal "Italian economic life" (La vita economica italiana), which was published until 1943.

In 1927, he published a treatise entitled The Scientific Basis of Fascism.

In 1929, Gini founded the Italian Committee for the Study of Population Problems (Comitato italiano per lo studio dei problemi della popolazione), which, two years later, organised the first Population Congress in Rome.

A eugenicist apart from being a demographer, Gini led an expedition to survey Polish populations, among them the Karaites. Gini was, throughout the 20s, a supporter of fascism, and expressed his hope that Nazi Germany and Fascist Italy would emerge as victors in WW2. However, he never supported any measure of exclusion of the Jews.

His role in the racial and anti-Jewish policies of the regime are more sinister, according to what is explained in detail in the book Scienza e razza nell'Italia fascista by Giorgio Israel and Pietro Nastasi, published by Il Mulino in Bologna in 1998. Milestones during the rest of his career include:

- In 1933 – vice president of the International Institute of Sociology.
- In 1934 – president of the Italian Genetics and Eugenics Society.
- In 1935 – president of the International Federation of Eugenics Societies in Latin-language Countries.
- In 1937 – president of the Italian Society of Sociology.
- In 1937 – honorary member of the International Statistical Institute.
- In 1937 – founded the journal Genus, which was focused on studying the population issues.
- In 1941 and 1949 – president of the Italian Statistical Society.
- In 1950 – president of the International Institute of Sociology.
- In 1957 – Gold Medal for outstanding service to the Italian School.
- In 1962 – National Member of the Accademia dei Lincei.

== Italian Unionist Movement ==
On 12 October 1944, Gini joined with the Calabrian activist Santi Paladino, and fellow-statistician Ugo Damiani to found the Italian Unionist Movement, for which the emblem was the Stars and Stripes, the Italian flag and a world map. According to the three men, the government of the United States should annex all free and democratic nations worldwide, thereby transforming itself into a world government, and allowing Washington, D.C. to maintain Earth in a perpetual condition of peace. The party existed up to 1948 but had little success and its aims were not supported by the United States.

== Organicism and nations ==
Gini was a proponent of organicism and saw nations as organic in nature. Gini shared the view held by Oswald Spengler that populations go through a cycle of birth, growth, and decay. Gini claimed that nations at a primitive level have a high birth rate, but, as they evolve, the upper classes birth rate drops while the lower class birth rate, while higher, will inevitably deplete as their stronger members emigrate, die in war, or enter into the upper classes. If a nation continues on this path without resistance, Gini claimed the nation would enter a final decadent stage where the nation would degenerate as noted by decreasing birth rate, decreasing cultural output, and the lack of imperial conquest. At this point, the decadent nation with its ageing population can be overrun by a more youthful and vigorous nation. Gini's organicist theories of nations and natality are believed to have influenced policies of Italian Fascism.

== Honours ==
The following honorary degrees were conferred upon him:

- Economics by the Catholic University of the Sacred Heart in Milan (1932),
- Sociology by the University of Geneva (1934),
- Sciences by Harvard University (1936),
- Social Sciences by the University of Cordoba, Argentina (1963).

== Partial bibliography ==
- Il sesso dal punto di vista statistica: le leggi della produzione dei sessi (1908)
- Sulla misura della concentrazione e della variabilità dei caratteri (1914)
- Quelques considérations au sujet de la construction des nombres indices des prix et des questions analogues (1924)
- Memorie di metodologia statistica. Vol.1: Variabilità e Concentrazione (1955)
- Memorie di metodologia statistica. Vol.2: Transvariazione (1960)
- — (March 1927). "The Scientific Basis of Fascism". Political Science Quarterly. 42 (1): 99–115. doi:10.2307/2142862. JSTOR 2142862.
