= Statistical Methods & Applications =

- Discipline: Statistics
- Language: English
- Edited by: Brunero Liseo

Publication details
- Former name(s): Journal of the Italian Statistical Society
- History: 1992–present
- Publisher: Springer Science+Business Media on behalf of the Italian Statistical Society
- Frequency: 5/year
- Open access: Hybrid
- Impact factor: 1.1 (2023)

Standard abbreviations
- ISO 4: Stat. Methods Appl.

Indexing
- ISSN: 1618-2510 (print); 1613-981X (web)
- LCCN: 2005260103
- OCLC no.: 53149309

Links
- Journal homepage; Online archive

Statistical Methods & Applications is a peer-reviewed scientific journal covering statistics. It was established in 1992 as the Journal of the Italian Statistical Society, obtaining its current title in 2001. The editor-in-chief is Brunero Liseo (Sapienza University of Rome).

== Abstracting and indexing ==
The journal is abstracted and indexed in:

- EBSCO databases
- EconLit
- MathSciNet
- ProQuest databases
- Science Citation Index Expanded
- Scopus
- zbMATH Open

According to the Journal Citation Reports, the journal has a 2023 impact factor of 1.1.
