= Eliezer Ben-Rafael =

Israeli sociologist

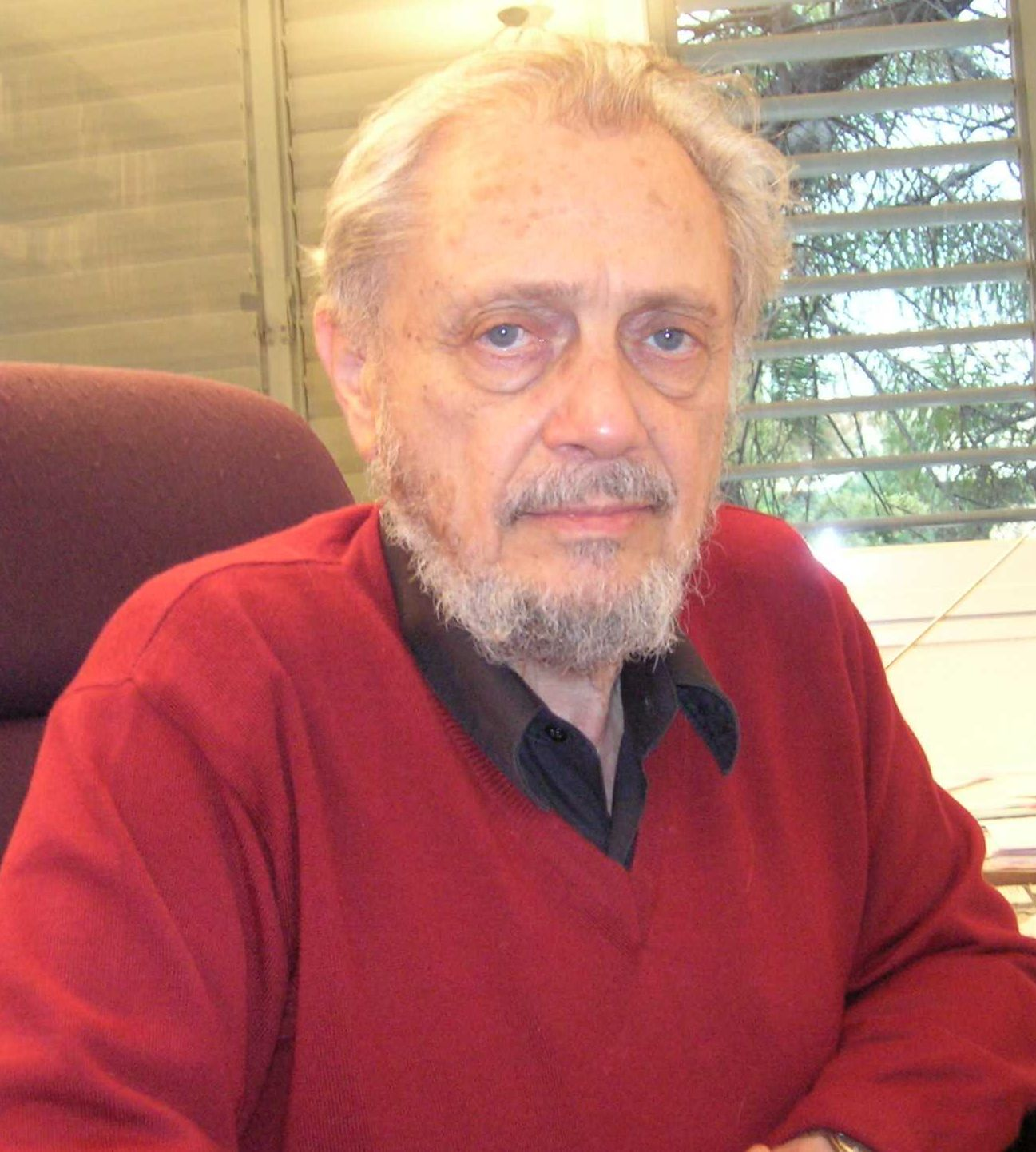
Portrait of Eliezer Ben-Rafael

Eliezer Ben-Rafael (Hebrew: אליעזר בן-רפאל; born 1938 in Belgium) is an Israeli sociologist. He is Weinberg Professor of Sociology, emeritus, at Tel Aviv University.

Ben-Rafael is known for his work on the kibbutz, on language and ethnicity in Israel, and on globalization and Jewish identity. He is editor of a series on Jewish identities for Brill Publishers.

Ben-Rafael is a former president of the International Institute of Sociology and former Chair of the Israeli Association for the Study of Language.

== Childhood ==
Eliezer Ben-Rafael was a hidden child in Belgium during the Holocaust.

== Work on Kibbutz Reform ==
In the early 1990s, Ben-Rafael was asked by the members of the kibbutz movement to chair a working group, "The Kibbutz at the Turn of the Century Project," to explore potential paths to the future for kibbutzim, many of which were failing both economically and failing to retain or attract members. Ben-Rafael was Chair of the Ben-Raphael Committee, a committee appointed by the Cabinet of Israel to produce a series of recommendations on structuring a process by which those kibbutzim that so chose could transition to a more market-oriented economic model. The recommendations were accepted by the government in 2004.

== Books ==
- The Metamorphosis of the Kibbutz, Ben-Rafael, E. & Shemer, O. (eds.) Brill, 2020
- Confronting Allosemitism in Europe: The Case of Belgian Jews, Brill, 2014
