= Ugo Damiani =

Italian politician and civil servant

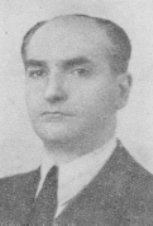

Member of the Italian Parliament for National Single Constituency
- In office 25 June 1946 – 31 January 1948

Personal details
- Born: March 13, 1899 Accumoli, Italy
- Died: June 14, 1992 (aged 93) Rieti, Italy
- Party: Italian Unionist Movement
- Education: Engineer's degree
- Profession: Italian National Institute of Statistics civil servant

Ugo Damiani (13 March 1899 – 14 June 1992) was an Italian civil servant and politician. He was the sole representative of the Italian Unionist Movement in the Constituent Assembly of Italy.

== Biography ==
Ugo Damiani was born in Accumoli, Italy, on 13 March 1899. He served as a deputy in the Constituent Assembly of Italy, where he was the only elected representative of the Italian Unionist Movement. The Italian Unionist Movement aimed to unite all free and democratic nations of the world into the Federal government of the United States, transforming it into a federal world government, to maintain perpetual peace on Earth.

As a member of the Constituent Assembly, Damiani was part of the Mixed Group and served on the Committee for Internal Regulations. Beyond his political career, Damiani was a civil servant working with the Italian National Institute of Statistics (ISTAT).

He died in Rieti on 14 June 1992.
