= Alfredo Poviña =

Argentine sociologist

Alfredo Poviña (1904–1986) was an Argentine sociologist and one of the leading practitioners of academic sociology in Latin America.

== Selected works ==
- History of Latin American sociology (1941)
- Sociology Course (1945)
- Cuestiones de ontologia sociologica [Questions of sociological ontology]. Córdoba: Editorial Assandri. 1949.
- New history of American sociology (1959)
- Treaty of Sociology
- Theory of Folklore
