= Alessandro Molinari =

Alessandro Molinari (1898 – 1962) was the first General Director of ISTAT, which was then known as the National Institute of Technology, in Fascist Italy. He reported directly to Corrado Gini, who was President of the statistical institute. Although Gini was a Fascist, Molinari was a socialist who was never a card-carrying member of the Fascist Party.

Born in Veneto, he became the General Manager of SVIMEZ from 1948 to 1958.
