= Bibliothèque Sociologique Internationale =

Bibliothèque Sociologique Internationale (BSI) ("International Sociological Library") is a significant scholarly book series that was founded and edited at the end of the 19th century by the French sociologist René Worms (1869–1926). It was published by the Paris-based publishing house V. Giard & E. Brière. Up to his death in 1926, nearly 70 works appeared in two sub-series, making this collection one of the most dynamic, but also one of the most long-lasting, within the social-scientific publishing landscape that emerged around the turn of the century.

== Volumes (in selection) ==
- 1. René Worms: Organisme et société. 1896
- 13. Scipio Sighele: Psychologie des sectes. Traduction française par Louis Brandin. 1898
- 22. Émile Bombard: La marche de l'humanité et les grands hommes d'après la Doctrine Positive. 1900
- 42. René Maunier: L'origine et la fonction économique des villes: étude de morphologie sociale. 1910

== See also ==
- Bibliothèque sociologique
- International Library of Sociology (Karl Mannheim)

== Bibliography ==
- Sébastien Mosbah-Natanson: "René Worms, directeur de la collection ‘Bibliothèque Sociologique Internationale’". Les Études Sociales 2015/1 n° 161–162, pp. 175–199
