= International Institute of Sociology =

Organization for the simulation of sociological science

- Formation: 1893; 133 years ago
- Founder: René Worms
- Headquarters: Paris; Geneva; Uppsala
- President: Craig Calhoun
- Affiliations: International Sociological Association (from 1971)
- Website: www.iisoc.org

The International Institute of Sociology (IIS) is a scholarly organization which seeks to stimulate and facilitate the development, exchange, and application of scientific knowledge to questions of sociological relevance. Membership is open to all sociologists as well as to scholars in neighbouring disciplines.

Created in Paris in 1893 by René Worms, it is the oldest continuous sociological association in existence. Its first congress was held in Paris in October 1894 under the chairmanship of René Worms, which formalised the foundation of this institution. The Révue internationale de sociologie, founded the year before, became the printed organ of the Institute. Since its foundation the goal of the IIS has been to bring together sociologists from around the world. It has a longstanding tradition of promoting discussions on the most crucial theoretical issues of the day and on the practical use of social scientific knowledge. Among its members and associates were prominent scholars such as: Franz Boas, Valtazar Bogišić, Roger Bastide, Lujo Brentano, Theodor Geiger, Gustave Le Bon, Karl Mannheim, William F. Ogburn, Pitirim Sorokin, Georg Simmel, Werner Sombart, Gabriel Tarde, Ferdinand Toennies, Thorstein Veblen, Lester F. Ward, Eliezer Ben-Rafael, Sidney Webb, Max Weber, Florian Znaniecki, and Ludwig Gumplowicz

Every two years the IIS organizes a world congress in Sociology. Recent IIS World Congresses were held in Uppsala (2013), Delhi (2012), Yerevan (2009), Budapest (2008), Stockholm (2005), Beijing (2004), Kraków (2001), Tel Aviv (1999), Köln (1997), Trieste (1995), Paris (1993), Kobe (1991), and Rome (1989).

In addition to the congresses and other meetings, the IIS publishes the Annales de l'Institut International de Sociologie / Annals of the International Institute of Sociology. First published in 1895 after the first world congress, this book series seeks to present cutting-edge research and synthesis.

== Leadership ==
Nr	President	Country	Term
1	John Lubbock, 1st Baron Avebury	United Kingdom	1893 – 1895
2	Albert Schäffle	Germany	1895 – 1896
3	Alfred Jules Émile Fouillée	France	1896 – 1897
4	Paul von Lilienfeld	Russia	1897 – 1898
5	Gumersindo de Azcárate	Spain	1898 – 1899
6	Achille Loria	Italy	1899 – 1900
7	Guillaume De Greef	Belgium	1900 – 1901
8	Carl Menger	Austria-Hungary	1901 – 1902
9	Valtazar Bogišić	Russia	1902 – 1903
10	Lester Frank Ward	United States	1903 – 1904
11	Pierre Émile Levasseur	France	1904 – 1905
12	Maksim Kovalevsky	Russia	1905 – ?
13	Francisco Giner de los Ríos	Spain	?
14	Hector Denis	Belgium	?
15	Ludwig Stein	Switzerland	1909 – ?
16	Eugen von Böhm-Bawerk	Austria-Hungary	?
17	Franklin Henry Giddings	United States	?
18	Frederic Harrison	United Kingdom	? 1910
19	Nikolai Ivanovich Kareev	Russia	? – 1917
20	Tomáš Masaryk	Czechoslovakia	1921 – 1923
21	Albion Woodbury Small	United States	1923 – 1925
22	Ferdinand Buisson	France	1925 – 1929
23	Mariano Harlan Cornejo	Peru	1929 – 1936
24	Charles A. Ellwood	United States	1936 – 1937
25	Pitirim Sorokin	United States	1937
26	René Maunier	France	? – 1944
27	Corrado Gini	Italy	1950 – 1963
28	Alfredo Poviña	Argentina	1963 – 1969
	Edgar F. Borgatta	United States	?
	Paolo Ammassari	Italy	1989 – 1991
	William V. D'Antonio	United States	1991 – 1993
	Erwin Scheuch	Germany	1993 – 1997
	Masamichi Sasaki	Japan	1997 – 2001
	Eliezer Ben-Rafael	Israel	2001 – 2008
	Björn Wittrock	Sweden	2008 – 2013
	Craig Calhoun	United States	2013 – present

== See also ==
- International Sociological Association
