= Parkchester General Hospital =

Defunct hospital in The Bronx/NYC, subsequently a nursing home

Geography
- Location: 1424 Parker Street, The Bronx, New York, United States
- Coordinates: 40°50′13″N 73°50′53″W

Organization
- Care system: Medicare, Medicaid, Private
- Type: General

Services
- Emergency department: No
- Beds: 208

History
- Opened: 1941
- Closed: 1978
- Demolished: Before 2006

Links
- Lists: Hospitals in New York State
- Other links: Hospitals in The Bronx

Parkchester General Hospital, located in The Bronx, was a privately owned 208-bed medical facility that opened in 1941 and closed in 1978.

== Overview ==
The hospital's initial building stood 8 stories high. A four-storey addition was built in 1960. The owner, Dr. Charles Louis Engelsher, died while plans were being made for an adjacent third building which was to house an eight-storey nursing home. The hospital closed March 20, 1978 and was demolished some time prior to 2006 when an apartment building was built on the site.

== History ==
The hospital opened in 1941 as a privately owned hospital. When it closed in 1978, Parkchester was owned by Dr Bernard Kamer. It was earlier owned by Dr Charles Louis Engelsher from 1941 to his death from coronary occlusion on August 25, 1964 (age 62). A program to help those in need, especially the elderly, named RAIN, was founded by a Parkchester Hospital nurse, Beatrice Castiglia-Catullo. The sponsored residences found at the site of the old hospital are named for Beverley.

== Controversy ==
Kamer, the hospital's owner, filed for a Chapter 11 bankruptcy protection on March 17, 1971, after which the State Commissioner of Health in New York began proceedings to close the hospital.

The final closing of the hospital followed a 30-day suspension of the abortion and maternity services by the New York State Health Department, citing "life‐threatening deficiencies". The hospital contended that there was an undeserved rush by State officials to close them, even though the hospital had previously passed two accreditation inspections, both before and after the investigation.
