= Stefano Molinari =

Italian footballer

Personal information
- Date of birth: 26 August 2000 (age 26)
- Place of birth: Italy
- Height: 1.87 m (6 ft 2 in)
- Position: Centre back

Team information
- Current team: Vogherese

Youth career
- Pro Patria

Senior career*
Years	Team	Apps	(Gls)
2019–2023	Pro Patria	64	(2)
2019	→ Milano City (loan)	16	(1)
2023–2025	Città di Varese	33	(2)
2025–2026	Fasano	1	(0)
2026–	Vogherese	3	(0)
- * Club domestic league appearances and goals as of 22 February 2026

Stefano Molinari (born 26 August 2000) is an Italian professional footballer who plays as a centre back for Serie D club Vogherese.

== Club career ==
Formed on Pro Patria youth system, Molinari made his first team debut on 24 November 2019 against Pistoiese.

On 8 January 2019, he joined Serie D club Milano City on loan.

He scored his first goal for the club on 1 December 2019 against Renate.
