= René Worms =

French auditor

René Worms (8 December 1869, Rennes – 12 February 1926, Paris) was a French auditor of the Conseil d'État. He was the son of professor of political economics, Émile Worms.

== Early life and education ==
Worms was educated at the lyceum of his native city, at the Lycée Charlemagne, and at the Ecole Normale Supérieure in Paris (docteur en droit, 1891; docteur ès lettres, and docteur ès sciences politiques et economiques, 1896). Worms, who was a member of the Académie des Sciences Morales et Politiques of the Institut de France, became a member of the higher statistical board in 1897 and of the consulting committee for agricultural statistics in 1903, besides being a member of many learned societies.

== Career ==
He began his legal career as an advocate at the Court of Appeals in Paris in 1891, and was appointed auditor of the council of state three years later. He has been on the examining board for commercial high schools since 1897. In 1904 he was the secretary of the extra-parliamentary board of marine investigation, and in the following year was appointed recording secretary of the French colonial congress. His talents found university recognition in 1895, when he was appointed lecturer on political economy in the faculty of law of the University of Paris. He held this position until 1897, when he was chosen associate professor in the same faculty at Caen, remaining there until 1902; he was instructor in the faculty of law, section of economic sciences, and in the Ecole Normale Supérieure in 1897, and was appointed in 1902 honorary professor of political economy at the Commercial Institute, Paris.

In 1893 Worms established the "Revue Internationale de Sociologie," of which he became the editor, and later founded the "Bibliothèque Sociologique Internationale," besides organizing the Institut International de Sociologie and the Société de Sociologie de Paris. He is, furthermore, a prolific writer, his principal works being as follows: "De la Volonté Unilatérale Considérée Comme Source d'Obligations" (Paris, 1891); "Précis de Philosophie" (3d ed. 1905); "Eléments de Philosophie Scientifique et de Philosophie Morale" (ib. 1891); "La Morale de Spinoza" (crowned by the Académie des Sciences Morales et Politiques; ib. 1892); "De Natura et Methodo Sociologiæ" (ib. 1896); "Organisme et Société" (ib. 1896; Russian translation, St. Petersburg, 1897); "La Science et l'Art en Economie Politique" (Paris, 1896); and "Philosophie des Sciences Sociales" (3 vols., ib. 1903–5). In addition he has contributed briefer studies to technical magazines.

Worms was a devoted adherent of Judaism, and was chosen as its apologist at the Mole conference, where he twice defended the decree of Crémieux regarding the Jews of Algeria against those members who demanded its repeal. He was created a chevalier of the Legion of Honor Feb. 18, 1905.

== See also ==
- Worms (family)
