= Müller (surname) =

Müller (German pronunciation: [ˈmʏlɐ]; Czech and Slovak feminine: Müllerová) is a German-language surname, meaning 'miller' (as a profession). It is the most common family surname in Germany, Switzerland, and the French departments of Bas-Rhin and Moselle (with the spelling Müller, Mueller or Muller) and is the fifth most common surname in Austria (see List of most common surnames in Europe). Other forms are Miller (mainly Southern Germany, Austria and Switzerland) and Möller (Northern and Central Germany and the Netherlands).

== A–F ==
- Achim Müller (1938–2024), German chemist
- Adam Müller (1779–1829), German political economist and theorist of the state
- Adolf Müller (disambiguation), multiple people
- Alexander Müller (disambiguation), multiple people
- Alexandre Müller (born 1997), French tennis player
- Alfred Müller (disambiguation), multiple people
- Alina Müller (born 1998), Swiss ice hockey player
- Andy Müller-Maguhn (born 1971), German computer expert
- Andreas Müller (footballer, born 1962), German footballer
- Andreas Müller (footballer, born 2000), German footballer
- Andreas Müller (painter) (1811–1890), German historical painter
- Andreas Müller (athlete) (born 1971), Paralympic athlete from Germany
- Andreas Müller (cyclist) (born 1979), Austrian track cyclist
- Andreas Müller (politician), interim mayor of Leipzig, Germany
- Ann-Katrin Müller (born 1987), German journalist
- Arnold Müller (1884–1934), Austrian entomologist
- Axel Müller (archer) (born 1992), Swiss archer
- Axel Müller (rugby union) (born 1993), Argentine rugby union player
- Axel Müller (footballer) (born 1996), Uruguayan association footballer
- Axel Müller (politician) (born 1963), German politician
- Baal Müller (born 1969), German writer and publisher
- Bettina Müller (canoeist) (born 1952), German canoeist
- Bettina Müller (politician) (born 1959), German politician, Member of the Bundestag since 2013
- Bettina Müller-Weissina (born 1973), Austrian sprinter
- Carl Wilhelm Müller (1728–1801), German politician
- Carsten Müller (born 1970), German politician
- Caroline Müller (disambiguation), multiple people
- Caspar Detlef Gustav Müller (1927–2003), German Coptologist
- Cecília Müller (born 1958), Hungarian physician
- Claudia Müller (disambiguation), multiple people
- Daniel Müller (disambiguation), multiple people
- Detlef Müller (disambiguation), multiple people
- Dieter Müller (born 1954), German football player
- Dirk Müller (disambiguation), several persons
- Eduard Müller (disambiguation), several persons
- Erwin Wilhelm Müller (1911–1977), German physicist
- Filinto Müller (1900–1973), Brazilian politician and police chief
- Filip Müller (1922–2013), Holocaust survivor
- Frank Müller (born 1968), German decathlete
- Franz Müller (disambiguation), multiple people
- Friedrich Müller (disambiguation), several persons
- Fritz Müller (disambiguation), multiple people

== G–H ==
- Gebhard Müller (1900–1990), German lawyer and politician
- Georg Müller (explorer) (1790–1826), German engineer and explorer
- George Müller (1805–1898), Christian evangelist and orphanage director
- Georg Müller (agricultural scientist) (1917–2004), German agricultural scientist
- Georg Elias Müller (1850–1934), German experimental psychologist
- Georg Müller (Catholic bishop) (1951–2015), bishop of Trondheim
- Georg Alexander von Müller (1854–1940), German Navy Admiral
- Georg Müller-Jürgens (born Georg Müller, 1883–1971), mayor of Jever, Germany
- George Müller (1805–1898), Christian benefactor and missionary
- Gerd Müller (disambiguation), name of several persons
- Gerhard Müller (disambiguation), multiple people
- Gilles Müller (born 1983), Luxembourgian tennis player
- Günter Müller (born 1954), German jazz percussionist
- Gustav Müller (astronomer) (1851–1925), German astronomer
- Gustav Müller (politician) (1860–1921), Swiss politician
- Gustav Müller (serial killer) (1865–?), German bigamist, murderer and serial killer
- Gustav Wilhelm Müller (1857–1940), German zoologist
- Gustl Müller (1903–1989), German Nordic combined and cross-country skier
- Hanno Müller-Brachmann (born 1970), German baritone
- Hans Müller (aviator) (1896–1964), German aviator
- Hans Müller (boxer) (1915–1967), Swiss boxer
- Hans Müller (chess player) (1896–1971), Austrian chess player
- Hans Müller (director) (1909–1977), German film and television director
- Hans Müller (figure skater) (1931–2021), Swiss figure skater
- Hans Müller (footballer) (born 1954), Swiss footballer
- Hans Müller (lawyer) (1906–after 1947), German lawyer
- Hans Müller (motorcyclist) (born 1949), Swiss motorcycle racer
- Hans Müller (pentathlete) (born 1947), Swiss modern pentathlete
- Hans Müller (physician) (1915–1994), German physician
- Hans Müller (politician) (1884–1961), German jurist, administrator and politician
- Hans Muller (water polo) (1937–2015), Dutch sportsman
- Hans Karl Müller (1892–1977), German flying ace
- Hans Robert Müller (1911–1999), Austrian mathematician
- Hansjörg Müller (born 1968), German politician
- Hans-Werner Müller (1942-2026), German politician (CDU)
- Heiner Müller (1929–1995), German dramatist
- Heinrich Müller (cyclist) (1926–1997), Swiss cyclist
- Heinrich Müller (footballer, born 1888) (1888–1957), Swiss football player and manager
- Heinrich Müller (footballer, born 1909) (1909–2000), Austrian football player and coach
- Heinrich Müller (Gestapo) (1900-1945), head of the Nazi Gestapo
- Heinrich Müller (physiologist) (1820–1864), anatomist and physiologist
- Heinrich Müller (politician) (born 1981), South African Democratic Alliance politician
- Heinrich Müller (theologian) (1631–1675), Lutheran theologian
- Heinrich Anton Müller (1869–1930), Swiss painter
- Henri Müller, French curler
- Henrike Müller (born 1975), German politician
- Herbert Müller (disambiguation), multiple people
- Hermann Müller (disambiguation), name of several persons
- Herta Müller (born 1953), Romanian-born German novelist and poet, Nobel Prize in Literature
- Hildegard Müller (born 1967), German politician

== I–K ==
- Inge Müller (1925–1966), German poet
- Jaroslav Müller (1901–?), Czech swimmer
- Jens Müller (luger) (born 1965), East German luger
- Jens Müller (pilot) (1917–1999), Norwegian pilot
- Jens Mueller, birth name of Jaye Muller (born 1967), East German singer
- Jochum Nicolay Müller (1775–1848), Danish (Norwegian) Naval officer
- Joel Müller (1827–1895), German rabbi
- Joël Müller (born 1952), football player and manager
- Johann Müller (disambiguation), multiple people
- Johannes Müller von Königsberg (1436–1476), known as Regiomontanus, German mathematician and astronomer
- Johannes von Müller (1752–1809), Swiss historian
- Johannes Peter Müller (1801–1858), German physiologist, comparative anatomist, ichthyologist, and herpetologist
- Johannes Theodor Müller (1873–1953), German-Australian sculptor
- Johannes Müller Argoviensis (1828–1896), Swiss botanist
- Johannes Müller (theologian) (1864–1949), German Protestant theologian
- Johannes Müller (politician, born 1880) (1880–1964), German politician and mayor of Marburg
- Johannes Müller (politician, born 1969) (1969–2026), German politician, member of the Landtag of Saxony
- Johannes Müller (archaeologist) (born 1960), German archaeologist
- Jörg Müller (disambiguation), multiple people
- Josef Müller (art collector) (1887–1977), Swiss art collector and curator
- Josef Müller (entomologist) (1880–1964), Croatian entomologist
- Josef Müller (footballer) (1893–1984), German footballer
- Josef Müller (politician) (1898–1979), German politician and member of the German Resistance
- Josef Müller-Brockmann (1914–1996), graphic designer
- Josef Felix Müller (born 1955), Swiss sculptor, graphic artist and painter
- Joseph Muller (collector) (1883–1939), specialist in American music
- Joseph Müller (priest) (1894–1944), German Catholic priest and critic of the Nazi regime
- Joseph Muller (cyclist) (1895–1975), French cyclist
- Joseph E. Muller (1908–1945), American soldier and Medal of Honor recipient
- Joseph Maximilian Mueller (1894–1981), American prelate of the Roman Catholic Church
- Julius Müller (theologian) (1801–1878), German Protestant theologian
- Julius Müller (footballer) (1964-1933), German footballer
- Julius Müller (racewalker) (1938–2017), German racewalker
- Julius Müller (pole vaulter) (1903–1984), German pole vaulter
- Julius Müller (taekwondo), German taekwondo athlete
- Julius Müller, first person to use the Swiss-system tournament
- Jürgen Müller (born 1963), German neurologist and forensic psychiatrist
- Karl Müller (disambiguation), multiple people
- Klaus F. Müller (born 1949), German dentist and European pioneer of modern dental implantology
- Klaus J. Müller (1923–2010), German paleontologist
- Klaus Müller (economist) (1944–2026), German professor and Marxian economist
- Klaus Müller (politician) (born 1971), German politician; president of the Federal Network Agency 2022–present
- Klaus Uwe Müller (1915–1989), German chess player
- Kurt Müller (disambiguation), multiple people

== L–O ==
- Lauro Müller (1863–1926), Brazilian politician, diplomat, and military engineer
- Lena Müller (born 1987), German rower
- Leo Müller (1894–1941), Croatian industrialist and philanthropist killed during the Holocaust
- Leopold Müller (engineer) (1908–1988), Austrian engineer
- Leopold Müller (painter) (1834–1892), Austrian painter
- Lillian Müller (born 1951), Norwegian model and actress
- Lise Müller (born 1974), Danish politician
- Lorenz Müller, (1868–1953), German herpetologist
- Lucian Müller (1836–1898), German classical scholar
- Ludmila Müllerová (born 1954), Czech politician
- Ludwig Müller (disambiguation), several persons
- Maler Müller (1749–1825), German poet, dramatist and painter
- Malik Müller (born 1994), German basketball player
- Margit Müller (born 1952), German field hockey player
- Maria Müller (1898–1958), Austrian soprano
- Martin Müller (disambiguation), multiple people
- Martina Müller (disambiguation), multiple people
- Mary Müller (1819–1901) aka "Fémmina," New Zealand pamphleteer
- Matthias Müller (businessman) (born 1953), German manager at Volkswagen AG, and CEO of Porsche AG
- Matthias Müller (filmmaker) (born 1961), German experimental filmmaker and curator
- Matthias Müller (footballer) (born 1954), German footballer
- Matthias Müller (orienteer) (born 1982), Swiss orienteering competitor
- Maurice Müller (footballer) (born 1992), German footballer
- Maurice Müller (politician) (born 1983), German politician
- Maurice Edmond Müller (1918–2009), Swiss orthopedic surgeon
- Max Müller (1823–1900), British philologist
- Max Müller (philosopher) (1906–1994), German philosopher
- Max Müller (cross-country skier) (1916–2019), Swiss cross-country skier
- Max Müller (footballer) (born 1994), German footballer
- Max Müller (Danish army officer) (1808–1884), Danish military officer
- Max Ritter von Müller (1887–1918), German flying ace
- Michael Müller (bobsleigh) (born 1976), Austrian Olympic bobsledder
- Michael Muller (field hockey) (born 1965), Canadian former field hockey player
- Michael Müller (writer) (1825–1899), American Catholic writer
- Michael Müller (handballer) (born 1984), German handballer
- Michael Müller (footballer, born 1944), German footballer
- Michael Müller (footballer, born 1964), German footballer
- Michael Müller (footballer, born 1989), German footballer
- Michael Müller (politician, born 1948), German politician
- Michael Müller (politician, born 1964), German politician and mayor of Berlin
- Mike Muller (born 1971), American ice hockey player and coach
- Milena Müllerová (1923–2009), Czech gymnast
- Monika Müller-Seps (born 1986), Swiss chess grandmaster
- Müller (footballer) (born 1966), Brazilian footballer nicknamed Müller
- Niclas Müller (1809–1875), German-American poet
- Norbert Müller (born 1986), German politician
- Norman Müller (born 1985), German decathlete
- Nuraan Muller, South African politician
- Otto Müller (disambiguation), multiple people

== P–Z ==
- Paul Müller (actor) (1923–2016), Swiss actor
- Paul Müller (biologist) (1941–2010), German biologist
- Paul Müller (gymnast) (born 1946), Swiss Olympic gymnast
- Paul Müller (ice hockey) (1886–1974), Swiss ice hockey player
- Paul Hermann Müller (1899–1965), Swiss chemist
- Paul J. Mueller (1892–1964), United States Army officer
- Paul Milford Muller (1937–2013), American engineer and businessman
- Paul O. Müller (1915–1942), German physicist
- Paul Mueller, alleged early 20th century serial killer responsible for between 40 and 100 deaths in the United States and Germany
- Paul Heinrich Theodor Müller (1896–1945>), German member of the SS at Auschwitz concentration camp
- Patrick Müller (footballer) (born 1976), Swiss footballer
- Patrick Müller (cyclist) (born 1996), Swiss cyclist
- Patrick Müller (shot putter) (born 1996), German shot putter
- Peter Müller (disambiguation), multiple people
- Philipp Müller (disambiguation), multiple people
- Rabeya Müller (1957–2024), German Islamic scholar
- Renate Müller (1906–1937), German actress
- Richard Müller (disambiguation), multiple people
- Robert Muller (United Nations) (1923–2010), Belgian-French United Nations civil servant
- Robert Muller (screenwriter) (1925–1998), German-born British screenwriter
- Robert Mueller (1944–2026), American Director of the FBI and special counsel
- Bobby Muller (born 1946), American peace activist
- Robert Müller (ice hockey) (1980–2009), German ice hockey goaltender
- Robert Müller (footballer) (born 1986), German footballer
- Robert Enrique Muller (1881–1921), official photographer for the United States Navy
- Rosmarie Müller (born 1958), Swiss long-distance runner
- Ruben Müller (born 2005), German footballer
- Salomon Müller (1804–1864), German naturalist
- Sándor Müller, Hungarian footballer
- Sebastian Müller (politician) (born 1988), German politician
- Sepp Müller (born 1989), German politician
- Silke Müller (born 1978), German field hockey player
- Sophie Müller (1803–1830), German and Austrian stage actress
- Stefan Müller (disambiguation), multiple people
- Susanne Müller (field hockey) (born 1972), German field hockey player
- Sven Müller (footballer, born 1980), German footballer
- Sven Müller (racing driver) (born 1992), German racing driver
- Sven Müller (footballer, born 1996), German footballer
- Tamara Müller (born 1989), German politician
- Theo Müller (born 1940), German businessman
- Thomas Müller (disambiguation), multiple people
- Tobias Müller (born 1997), German racing driver
- Torsten Müller (agroscientist) (born 1961), German agroscientist
- Vincenz Müller (1894–1961), German soldier and politician
- Vít Müller, Czech athletics competitor
- Vladimir Müller (1880–before 1943), Russian lexicographer and medieval dramaturgy scholar
- Walter Müller (disambiguation), multiple people
- Walther Müller (1905–1979), German physicist
- Walther Otto Müller (1833–1887), German botanist
- Wenzel Müller (1767–1835), Austrian composer
- Werner Müller (canoeist) (born 1922), Swiss canoeist
- Werner Müller (ethnologist) (1907–1990), German anthropologist
- Werner Müller (mathematician) (born 1949), German mathematician
- Werner Müller (musician) (1920–1998), German composer
- Werner Müller (politician) (1946–2019), German manager and politician
- Wilhelm Müller (1794–1827), German poet
- Wilhelm Müller (handballer) (1909-1984), German handball player
- Wilhelm Müller (physicist) (1880–1968), German mathematician and physicist
- Wilhelm Konrad Hermann Müller (1812–1890), German philologist
- Wilhelm Max Müller (1862–1919), American orientalist
- William H. Muller Jr. (1919–2012), American cardiologist
- William James Müller (1812–1845), English painter
- William Max Muller (1867–1945), British diplomat
- Wolfgang Müller (actor) (born 1953), German actor
- Wolfgang Müller (artist) (born 1957), German artist, musician, and writer
- Wolfgang Müller (equestrian) (1931–2021), German equestrian
- Wolfgang Müller (field hockey) (born 1938), German field hockey player
- Wolfgang Müller (skier) (born 1955), German cross-country skier
- Wolfgang Müller (sprinter) (born 1943), German sprinter
- Wolfgang Müller (weightlifter) (born 1936), German weightlifter
- Xeno Müller (born 1972), Swiss rower

== See also ==
- Müller (disambiguation)
- Muller, people with this surname
