= Johannes Müller =

Johannes Müller, Johann Müller or Hans Müller is the name of:

- Johannes Müller von Königsberg (1436–1476), known as Regiomontanus, German mathematician and astronomer
- Johannes von Müller (1752–1809), Swiss historian
- Johannes Peter Müller (1801–1858), German physiologist, comparative anatomist, ichthyologist, and herpetologist
- Johannes Theodor Müller (1873–1953), German-Australian sculptor
- Johannes Müller Argoviensis (1828–1896), Swiss botanist
- Johannes Müller (theologian) (1864–1949), German Protestant theologian
- Johannes Müller (politician, born 1880) (1880–1964), German politician and mayor of Marburg
- Johannes Müller (politician, born 1969) (1969–2026), German politician, member of the Landtag of Saxony
- Johannes Müller (archaeologist) (born 1960), German archaeologist

== See also ==
- Johan Müller (disambiguation)
- Johann Müller (disambiguation)
- Hans Müller (disambiguation)
- Müller (surname)
