= General Müller (disambiguation) =

Friedrich-Wilhelm Müller (1897–1947) was a German Wehrmacht general of the infantry. General Müller or Muller may also refer to:

- Alfred Müller (general) (1915–1997), German Wehrmacht brigadier general
- Bernhard Müller (general) (born 1957), Swiss Air Force divisional general
- Dietrich von Müller (1891–1961), German Wehrmacht lieutenant general
- Eugen Müller (1891–1951), German Wehrmacht general of artillery
- François Muller (1764–1808), French Royal Army general of brigade and general of division
- Gotthold Müller (1795–1882), Danish major general
- Gottlob Müller (1895–1945), German Luftwaffe lieutenant general
- Heinrich Müller (Gestapo) (1900–c. 1945), German Schutzstaffel general
- Henry J. Muller (CERDEC) (fl. 1980s–2010s), U.S. Army general
- Henry J. Muller (born 1917), U.S. Army brigadier general
- Jacques Léonard Muller (1749–1824), French Army general of division
- Ludwig Müller (general) (1892–1972), German Wehrmacht general of the infantry
- Michal Muller (born 1930), South African Army lieutenant general
- Richard Müller (general) (1891–1943), German Wehrmacht lieutenant general
- Vincenz Müller (1894–1961), East German National People's Army lieutenant general

== See also ==
- Philipp Müller-Gebhard (1889–1970), German Wehrmacht lieutenant general
- Desmond Mueller (born 1943), Australian Army lieutenant general
- Paul J. Mueller (1892–1964), U.S. Army major general
