= Klaus Müller =

Klaus Müller may refer to:

- Klaus F. Müller (born 1949), German dentist and European pioneer of modern dental implantology
- Klaus J. Müller (1923–2010), German paleontologist
- Klaus Müller (economist) (1944–2026), German professor and Marxian economist
- Klaus Müller (politician) (born 1971), German politician; president of the Federal Network Agency 2022–present
- Klaus Uwe Müller (1915–1989), German chess player
