= Robert Muller =

Robert Muller, Mueller or Müller may refer to:

- Robert Muller (United Nations) (1923–2010), Belgian-French United Nations civil servant
- Robert Muller (screenwriter) (1925–1998), German-born British screenwriter
- Robert Mueller (1944–2026), American Director of the FBI and special counsel
- Bobby Muller (born 1946), American peace activist
- Robert Müller (ice hockey) (1980–2009), German ice hockey goaltender
- Robert Müller (footballer) (born 1986), German footballer
- Robert Enrique Muller (1881–1921), official photographer for the United States Navy

== Other surnames ==
- Moeller, a surname
- Moller (including also Möller and Møller), a surname
- Mueller (surname)
- Müller (surname)

== See also ==
- Robert Mueller Municipal Airport, a former airport in Austin, Texas, US
- Robert Meller (1564–1624), English politician
