= Henry Muller =

Henry Muller may refer to:

- Henry Müller (1896–1982), German footballer
- Henry Muller (writer) (1902–1980), French writer, journalist and book publisher
- Henry J. Muller (1917–2022), American Army brigadier general
- Henry J. Muller (CERDEC), director for the U.S. Army Communications-Electronics Research, Development and Engineering Center
