= Adolf Müller =

Adolf Müller may refer to:

- Adolf Müller (industrialist) (1857–1932), Croatian industrialist
- Adolf Müller (entomologist) (1888–1976), German arachnologist and entomologist
- Adolf Müller (wrestler) (1914–2005), Swiss wrestler
- Adolf Müller (politician, born 1916) (1916–2005), German CDU Bundestag member
- Alf Müller (Adolf Gustav Müller, 1889–1970), Australian politician from Queensland
- Adolf Müller Sr. (1801–1886), Austrian composer
- Adolf Müller Jr. (1839–1901), Austrian composer, son of the above

== See also ==
- Adolf Müllner (1774-1829), German critic and dramatic poet
