= Suchomel =

- Pronunciation: IPA: [ˈsuxomɛl]

Origin
- Language: Czech
- Meaning: owner of a windmill
- Region of origin: Czech Republic

Other names
- Variant form: Suchomil
- See also: Windmüller

Suchomel (with its female form Suchomelová) is a Czech surname that is also present in the Czech diaspora.
Notable people with the name Suchomel/Suchomelová include:

- Filip Suchomel (born 1966), Czech japanologist, art historian and educator
- Franz Suchomel (1907–1979), Sudeten German Nazi war criminal
- Hugo Suchomel (1883−1957), Austrian lawyer and ministerial official
- Ladislav Suchomel (1930–2019), Czech anti-Communist resistance activist
- Olga Suchomelová (born 1950), Czech writer
- Radek Suchomel (1976–2008), Czech bodybuilder
