= Hans Müller =

Hans Müller, Mueller or Muller may refer to:

- Hans Müller von Bulgenbach (c.1490-1525), peasant leader during the German Peasants' War
- Hans Müller (politician) (1884–1961), German politician (CSU)
- Hans Müller (chess player) (1896–1971), Austrian chess player
- Hans Müller (aviator) (1896–1964), World War I flying ace
- Hans Müller (boxer) (1916-1967), Swiss Olympic boxer
- Hans Karl Müller (1892–1977), World War I flying ace
- Hans Mueller (physicist) (1900–1965), physicist and professor
- Hans Müller (director) (1909–1977), German film and television director
- Hans Müller (physician) (1910–1994), physician working in China
- Hans Müller (figure skater) (1931-2021), Swiss figure skater and coach
- Hans Müller (pentathlete) (born 1947), Swiss Olympic pentathlete
- Hans Müller (motorcyclist) (born 1949), Swiss Grand Prix motorcycle racer
- Hansi Müller (Hans-Peter Müller, born 1957), German former football player
- Hans Robert Müller (1911–1999), Austrian mathematician
- Hans Müller (lawyer) (1906-after 1947), German lawyer
- Hans Muller (water polo) (1937–2015), Dutch water polo player

== With double names ==
- Hans Müller-Einigen (1882–1950), German language playwright, added the Swiss village of Einigen to his name
- Hans J. Müller-Eberhard (1927–1998), German-American molecular immunologist
- Hans-Wilhelm Müller-Wohlfahrt (born 1942), German doctor of sports medicine

== See also ==
- Johann Müller (disambiguation)
- Johannes Müller (disambiguation)
