= Windmüller =

Windmüller (also appearing in the diaspora variants Windmueller and Windmiller) is a German language occupational or status surname for the owner of a windmill and may refer to:

- Bigna Windmüller (born 1991), Swiss ski jumper
- Gino Windmüller (born 1989), German footballer
- Sabrina Windmüller (born 1987), Swiss ski jumper
- Steven Windmueller, American scholar

== See also ==
- Muller
- Mueller
- Müller (surname)
