= Muller =

Muller is a surname. Notable people with the surname include:

== A–H ==
- Alexandre Muller (born 1997), French tennis player
- Amandine Muller (born 2006), French cyclist
- A. Charles Muller (born 1953), translator
- Bauke Muller (born 1962), Dutch bridge player
- Bennie Muller (1938–2024), Dutch footballer
- Bill Muller (1965–2007), US journalist
- Bobby Muller (born 1946), Vietnam veteran
- Carl Muller (1935–2019), Sri Lankan Burgher writer, poet, and journalist
- Christiaan Alexander Muller (1923–2004), Dutch radio astronomer
- David E. Muller (1924–2008), American mathematician and computer scientist
- Derek Muller (born 1982), science communicator
- Dominique Muller (born 1949), French writer
- Édouard Muller (painter) (1823–1876), Swiss-French painter
- Édouard Muller (cyclist) (1919–1997), French road racing cyclist
- Ellen Preis (Ellen Müller-Preis) (1912–2007), German-born Austrian fencer
- Émile Muller (1915–1988), French politician
- Filinto Muller (1900–1973), Brazilian politician
- Franck Muller (born 1958), Swiss watchmaker
- François Muller (1764–1808), French general of the French Revolutionary Wars
- Frank Muller (1951–2008), Dutch audio book narrator and actor
- Frans Muller (born 1960/61), Dutch businessman
- Frederick Muller (1861–1946), American Medal of Honor recipient
- Gary Muller (born 1964), South African tennis player
- Germain Muller (1923–1994), French playwright, actor, poet, humourist, politician
- Hendrik Pieter Nicolaas Muller (1859–1941), Dutch businessman, publicist, and diplomat
- Henry J. Muller (1917–2022), American brigadier general
- Henry J. Muller (CERDEC), American commanding general
- Herbert J. Muller (1905–1980), American historian, academic, government official and author
- Hermann Joseph Muller (1890–1967), US geneticist (Muller's ratchet) and educator
- Muller (footballer, born 1986), Muller Santos da Silva, Brazilian football striker

== J–Z ==
- Jacques Muller (politician) (born 1954), French politician
- Jacques Léonard Muller (1749–1824), French army commander of the French Revolutionary Wars
- Jean M. Muller (1925–2005), French structural engineer
- Jerry Z. Muller (born 1954), American historian
- Jim Muller, co-founder of Voice of the Faithful
- Judy Muller, American journalist
- Kirk Muller (born 1966), Canadian hockey player
- Kyle Muller (born 1997), American baseball player
- Lucien Muller (1934–2026), French footballer and manager
- Luke Muller (born 1996), American sailor and Olympian
- Mae Muller (born 1997), English singer-songwriter
- Mancow Muller (born 1966), American radio and television personality
- Marcia Muller (born 1944), American mystery writer
- Mervin E. Muller (1928–2018), American computer scientist
- Oscar Muller (1957–2005), Argentine footballer
- Peter Muller (Canadian football) (born 1951), Canadian football player
- Peter Paul Muller (born 1965), Dutch actor
- Pieter Muller (born 1969), South African rugby player
- Ramon Muller (1935–1986), Argentine footballer
- Richard A. Muller (born 1944), American physicist
- Robert Muller (1923–2010), United Nations employee
- Romeo Muller (1928–1992), American actor and writer
- Scott Muller (canoeist) (born 1970), Panamanian canoer
- Scott Muller (cricketer) (born 1971), Australian cricketer
- Shulamith Muller (1922–1978). South African lawyer, communist, and anti-apartheid activist
- Sophie Muller (born 1962), British music video director
- Steven Muller (1927–2013), president of Johns Hopkins University
- Ullrich Muller (born 2006), Australian Paralympic athlete
- Victor Muller (born 1959), Dutch entrepreneur
- Virginie Duby-Muller (born 1979), French politician
- Yvan Muller (born 1969), French auto racing driver

== Fictional characters ==
- Caroline "Cathy" Muller, fictional character created by Tom Clancy, wife of Jack Ryan
- Rudolfine Muller, a character from Strike Witches
- Jake Muller, Albert Wesker's illegitimate son and protagonist of the video game Resident Evil 6
- Jerry Muller, a character in the 1934 film The Man Who Changed His Name

== See also ==
- Müller (surname)
- Mueller (surname)
