= Alfred Müller =

Alfred Müller or Alfred Mueller may refer to:

- Alfred Müller (entrepreneur) (1888–1945), Croatian entrepreneur
- Alfred Müller-Armack (1901–1978), German economist and politician
- Alfred Müller (runner) (1905–1959), German Olympic middle-distance runner
- Alfred Müller (general) (1915–1997), German Wehrmacht general
- Alfred Müller (actor) (1926–2010), German stage and screen actor
- Alfred Müller-Felsenburg (1926–2007), honored by the Alfred-Müller-Felsenburg-Preis literary prize in Germany
- Alfred Mueller (born 1939), American theoretical physicist
- Alfred Muller (1940–2020), French deputy 1993–1997
- Alfred Müller (swimmer) (born 1948), German Olympic swimmer
