= Köhler's Medicinal Plants =

German herbal medicine book by Hermann Köhler

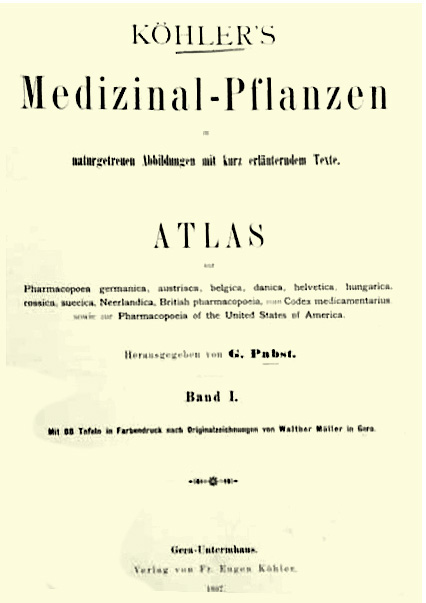
- Editor: Gustav Pabst
- Author: Hermann Adolph Köhler et al.
- Original title: Köhler's Medizinal-Pflanzen in naturgetreuen Abbildungen mit kurz erläuterndem Texte : Atlas zur Pharmacopoea germanica etc.
- Illustrators: K. Gunther; Walther Otto Müller; C. F. Schmidt
- Language: German
- Publisher: Franz Eugen Köhler
- Publication date: 1887 (Volume 1); 1890 (Volume 2); 1898 (Volume 3)
- Media type: Print

Köhler's Medicinal Plants (or, Köhler's Medizinal-Pflanzen) is a German herbal written principally by Hermann Adolph Köhler (1834–1879, physician and chemist), and edited after his death by Gustav Pabst. The work was first published in the late 19th century by Franz Eugen Köhler of Gera. Its complete title is Köhler's Medizinal-Pflanzen in naturgetreuen Abbildungen mit kurz erläuterndem Texte : Atlas zur Pharmacopoea germanica, austriaca, belgica, danica, helvetica, hungarica, rossica, suecica, Neerlandica, British pharmacopoeia, zum Codex medicamentarius, sowie zur Pharmacopoeia of the United States of America.

== Publication history ==
Originally, Köhler published the herbal in two volumes: the first in 1887, the second in 1890. Volume one is illustrated with 84 full-page, multi-colour plates, and volume two with 110. A third volume was added in 1898, entitled Neueste Medizinalpflanzen und Verwechslungen, which is a supplement containing additions and corrections. Among the additions are 80 more colour plates. A fourth volume was announced by the publisher, but never released. All the colour plates in the herbal were produced through a process called chromolithography. The botanical illustrators were Walther Otto Müller, C. F. Schmidt, and K. Gunther.

A reprint was published in Germany a century after the original, first of extracts of the work, later the complete three volumes.

The name Köhler is sometimes corrupted to Koehler or Kohler.

Because of the identical names of first author and publisher, frequently Franz Eugen Köhler is erroneously mentioned as the author of the book.

== Illustration samples ==
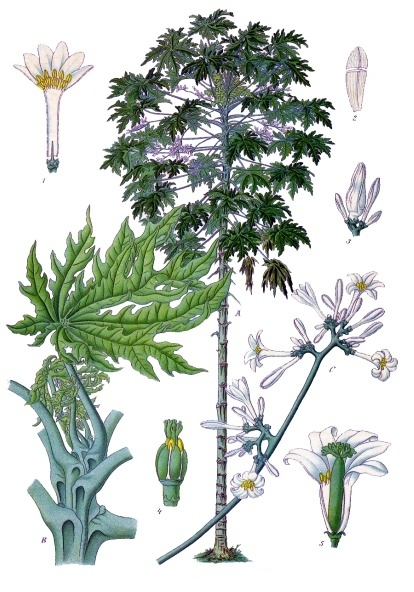
Carica papaya L. (whole plant, flowers)

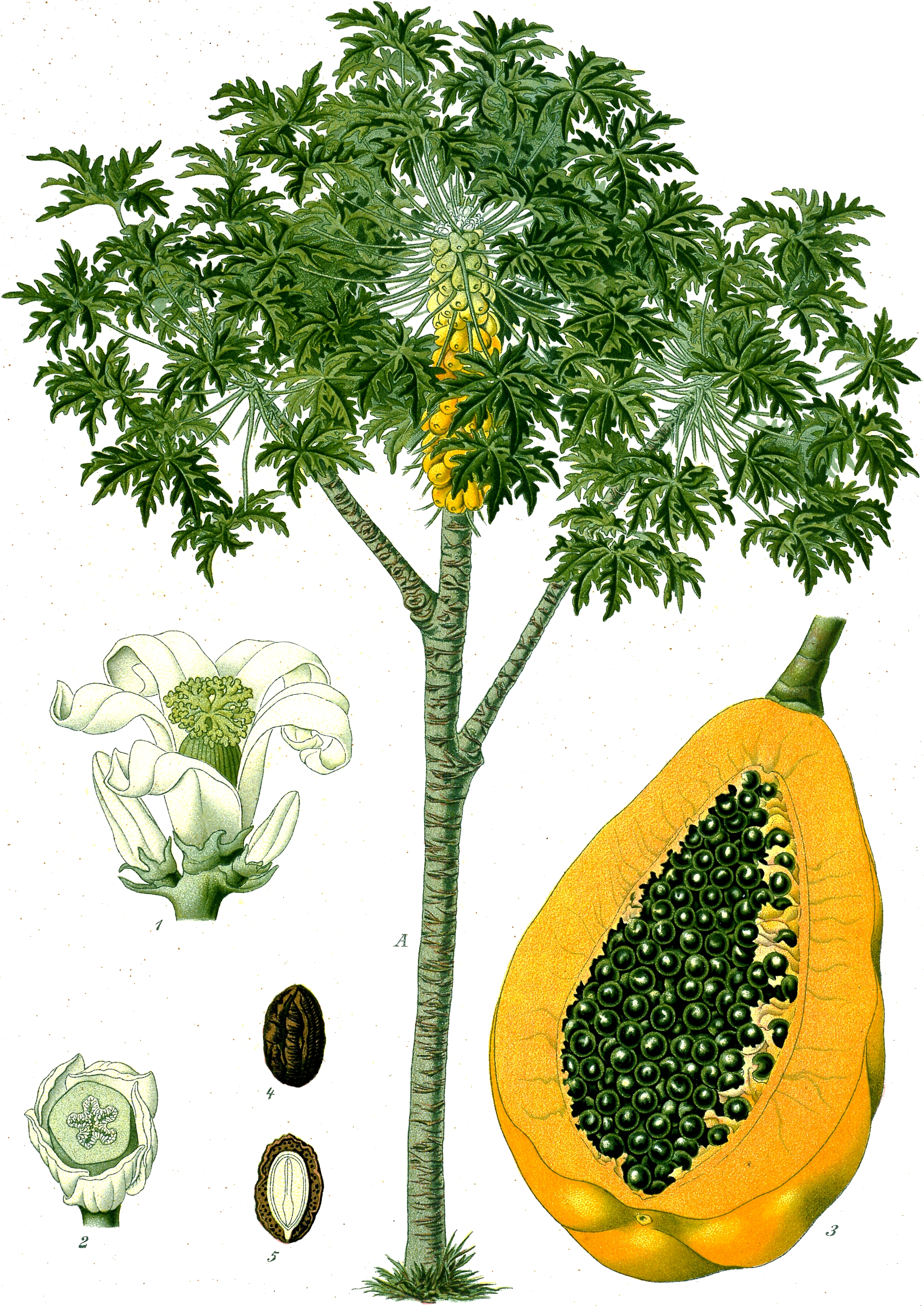
Carica papaya L. (whole plant, fruits)

== Reprint editions ==
- Reprint von Auszügen aus dem Gesamtwerk nach der zweibändigen Original-Ausgabe 1887/88 [recte 90]. Edition Libri rari im Verlag Schäfer, Hannover 1988, ISBN 978-3-88746-215-4.
- Zweite Reprintausgabe. Edition Libri rari im Verlag Schäfer, Hannover:
  - 1. Band, 1990, ISBN 978-3-88746-246-8.
  - 2. Band, 1990, ISBN 978-3-88746-247-5.
  - 3. Band, 1991, ISBN 978-3-88746-265-9.
