= Otto Müller =

Otto Müller or Mueller may refer to:

- Otto Mueller (1874–1930), German painter of the Die Brücke movement
- Otto Müller (painter) (1898–1979), German painter from Halle, Saxony-Anhalt
- Otto Mueller (politician) (1875–1973), American politician in Wisconsin
- Otto Müller (novelist) (1816–1894), German novelist
- Otto Müller (water polo) (1910–?), Austrian Olympic water polo player
- Otto Müller (wrestler) (1899–?), Swiss freestyle wrestler
- Otto Friedrich Müller (1730–1784), Danish naturalist
- Otto Müller (priest) (1870–1944), German priest, member of German Resistance in Nazi Germany
- Otto Thott Fritzner Müller (1864–1944), Norwegian politician
- Otto Müller or Walther Otto Müller (1833–1887), German botanist specializing in cryptogamenae

== See also ==
- Otto-Werner Mueller (1926–2016), German-born conductor
- Otto Muller von Czernicki (1909–1998), field hockey player
- Otto von Müller (1875–1976), German tennis player
