= Carl Friedrich Schmidt (artist) =

19th century German botanist (1811–1890)

Carl Friedrich (C.F.) Schmidt
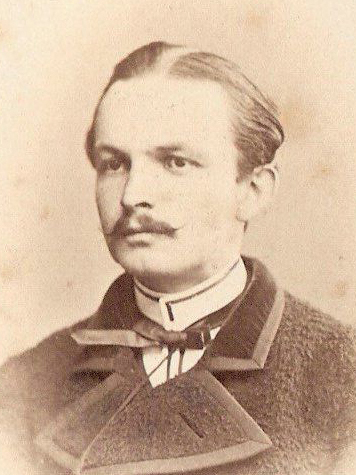
- Born: 1811; Stettin, Kingdom of Prussia
- Died: 1890 (aged 78–79); Berlin, German Empire
- Scientific career
- Fields: Botany, Botanical artist, Lithographer
- Workplaces: University of Berlin

Carl Friedrich (C.F.) Schmidt (1811, Stettin – 1890, Berlin) was a German botanical artist. He was a specialist in spermatophytes and was a renowned botanical artist (akademischer Künstler zu Berlin) and lithographer who illustrated many of the Germanic botanical works of the 19th century. He is not to be confused with Carl Friedrich Schmidt, born 1832, the Baltic German geologist and botanist. The standard author abbreviation C.F.Schmidt is used to indicate this person as the author when citing a botanical name.

== Biography ==
In collaboration with Otto Karl Berg (1815–1866), professor of pharmaceutical botany at Berlin University, Schmidt was published in Darstellung und Beschreibung in den Pharmacopoea Sämtliche Borussica offizinellen Gewächse aufgeführten (1853). Publisher: Arthur Felix, Leipzig Schmidt both drew and lithographed the plates. Benjamin Daydon Jackson describes this work, a survey of plants used in the Prussian pharmacopoeia, as "A thoroughly good book, probably the very best of its class; both in text and illustrations".

Berg and Schmidt also published the Pharmacopoea Borussica aufgeführten offizinellen Gewächse in 1846.

C.F. Schmidt was a contributing artist to the work Köhler's Medizinal Pflanzen. Publisher: Gera-Untermhaus : F.E. Köhler, [1883-1914]. Medizinal Pflanzen was published in 1887 in Gera, an east-central German city south of Leipzig. The set of four volumes was a noteworthy achievement and included plants of medicinal interest from several European nations. It was described by Sitwell and Blunt as "From the botanical standpoint the finest and most useful series of illustrations of medicinal plants." Köhler's Medizinal Pflanzen was edited by Gustav Pabst, a German botanist. The remarkable feature of the publication is its nearly 300 finely detailed illustrations, expertly drawn by the artists L. Müeller and C.F. Schmidt, which were skillfully rendered by K. Gunther in chromolithography. Chromolithography is the process of rendering images on stone or zinc plates, and then inking them with color inks to yield color pictures.

It is remotely possible that C.F. Schmidt was the proprietor of the C.F. Schmidt Photography Studio in Halberstadt, Saxony-Anhalt, Germany, in the mid 19th century. C.F. Schmidt, the botanical artist/lithographer, lived in Blankenburg am Harz, the village of his son's birth, in 1833. The C.F. Schmidt Photography Studio in Halberstadt is 16 km from Blankenburg. More research needs to be performed in this area to establish any connection.

== Family ==
Born in Stettin, Kingdom of Prussia, C.F. Schmidt would likely have been an acquaintance, perhaps even a close childhood friend, of Otto Karl Berg, who was also born in Stettin. It is with Berg, as adults, that Schmidt collaborated on several important scientific publications. Schmidt was four years older than Berg. In 1832 C.F. Schmidt married Christiane Johanne Kast. They had at least one son, Johann Christian Julius Schmidt, born in 1833 in Blankenburg am Harz, Germany.

== Gallery ==
Pharmacopoea Borussica aufgeführten offizinellen Gewächse

Pharmacopoea Borussica aufgeführten offizinellen Gewächse title page

Köhler's Medizinal Pflanzen, Volume 1 of 4

Köhler's Medizinal Pflanzen title page Volume 1

Köhler's Medizinal Pflanzen title page Volume 2

Bitter Orange

Caladium

Hibiscus

Walnut

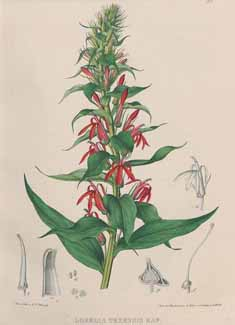
Lobelia

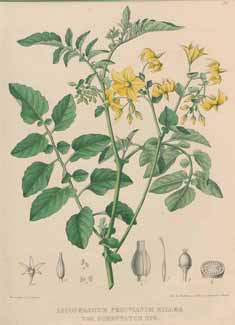
Tomato

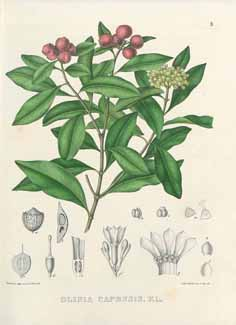
Black Ironwood

Pitcairnia

Scullcaps

Nasturtium

== Bibliography ==
- Staatsarchiv Hamburg Film No.: Signatur: 332-1 Wedde II, Item No.: 8 Band 138 1858 Nr. 4 identifies Johann Christian Julius Schmidt as the son of Carl Friedrich Schmidt and Christiane Johanne Kast.
- Emigration paper from St. Michaelis Kirche, Hamburg, Germany, dated 14 July 1891, verifying a Baptism record of Eugen Friedrich Julius Schmidt, in 1862. This document identifies the baby's father as Johann Christian Julius Schmidt, born in Blankenburg am Harz, Germany.
- Lithography
- Chromolithography
- Köhler's Medicinal Plants
- Münchener Digitalisierungszentrum (MDZ) Digitale Bibliothek
- Missouri Botanical Garden Library (MBG) Rare Books
- Art History: Chronology of Scientific Illustration 1850 to 1875
- Great Flower Books 1700-1900. 1956; reprint ISBN 0-871-13284-2
- Otto Karl Berg biography
- ITIS Report: Taxonomy of Artemisia cina
- Mansfeld's Encyclopedia of Agricultural and Horticultural Crops, p. 1229
- Antiquariaat Jan Meemelink, specialist dealer of antiquarian flower, garden, horticultural and botanical books
- Antique Botanical Prints by C.F. Schmidt - Philographikon Galerie Rauhut, Munich
- Genealogy of C.F. Schmidt
- Botanical Prints of Capsicum; New Mexico State University
- Biography of Benjamin Daydon Jackson
- Reiss & Sohn Antique Books, Deutsch
