= Johan Müller =

Johan Müller may refer to:

- Johan Müller (politician) (1889–1981), Estonian politician
- Johan Muller von Konigsberg (or Regiomontanus) (1436–1476), German mathematician, astrologer and astronomer

== See also ==
- Johann Müller (disambiguation)
