= Fanny Hünerwadel =

Swiss pianist, singer and composer

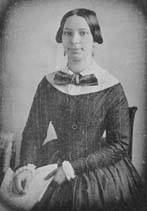
Fanny Hünerwadel c. 1850

Fanny Hünerwadel (26 January 1826 – 27 April 1854) was a Swiss pianist, singer and composer. She sang and performed in Zurich, Paris and London, but died of typhus at the age of 28. She wrote seven piano songs, some of which were published after her death.

== Life ==
Hünerwadel was a native of Lenzburg where she was born on 26 January 1826, and came from a long-established family of the city. She was the oldest child of the physician Johann Friedrich Hünerwadel and Speerli Regula, who were both avid music lovers. Hünerwadel was first taught music by her mother, and then studied piano under Philipp Tietz, Joseph Breitenbach and Ludwig Kurz. She also belonged to the local choral society.

She made her debut as a pianist in 1842 at Lenzburg. In 1846 she began studied piano, voice, music theory and composition with Hans Nägeli and Alexander Müller (1808–1863) in Zurich. From 1849, she made public appearances as a singer and pianist, performing benefit concerts at the Universal Music Company in Zurich. She sang in 1851 to inaugurate the new Lenzburg organ. Also, in 1851 she visited Paris and London. In 1852, she played Rondo Brilliant by Johann Nepomuk Hummel in a subscription concert of the General Music Society of Zurich, from which today's Tonhalle Orchestra Zurich emerged.

In 1853 as part of her training, she traveled to Florence and Rome. In Florence, she took singing lessons with Romani. In Rome in 1853 she was guest of artists and families Corrodi Imhof and took lessons in singing teacher Parisotti. Hünerwadel died of typhus on 27 April 1854 in Rome at the age of 28. Six of her seven existing piano songs were posthumously published in 1854. Liszt's composition "à Fanny H." is dedicated to Hünerwadel.

== Discography ==
- MGB CD 6153: "Richard Wagner and his composer friends in Zurich". Songs "Morning Song" and "Spring" by Fanny Hünerwadel.
