= Chorthippus acroleucus =

Conservation status
- Critically Endangered (IUCN 3.1)

Scientific classification
- Kingdom: Animalia
- Phylum: Arthropoda
- Class: Insecta
- Order: Orthoptera
- Suborder: Caelifera
- Family: Acrididae
- Genus: Chorthippus
- Species: C. acroleucus

Binomial name
- Chorthippus acroleucus (Müller, 1924)

Species of grasshopper

Chorthippus acroleucus is a species of grasshopper found in Romania.
