= Martin Müller =

Martin Müller may refer to:

- Martin Müller (cyclist) (born 1974), German cyclist
- Martin Müller (footballer, born 1957), Swiss football player
- Martin Müller (footballer, born 1970), Czech football player
- Martin Muller (handballer, 1988) (born 1988), Luxembourgish handball player
- Martin Müller (handballer, 1990) (born 1990), German handball player
- Martin Muller (rugby union) (born 1988), South African rugby union player
- Martin Müller (wrestler) (born 1966), Swiss Olympic wrestler
- Martin U. Müller, German journalist
