= Detlef Müller =

Detlef Müller may refer to:

- Detlef Müller (footballer) (born 1965), German-born Turkish footballer
- Detlef Müller (politician) (born 1964), German politician
- Detlef Müller (mathematician) (born 1954), German mathematician
