= Franz Müller (disambiguation) =

Franz Müller (1840–1864), was a German murderer.

Franz Müller may refer to:

- Franz Müller (physician) (1805–1883), Swiss physician and politician
- Franz Müller (born 1965), German film director, screenwriter and producer
- Franz Müller-Gossen (c. 1871–1946), German painter
- Franz-Joseph Müller von Reichenstein (1740s—1820s), Austrian mineralogist and mining engineer
