= Language Science Press =

German scholarly publishing house

- Status: Non-profit enterprise company with limited liability
- Founded: 2013; 13 years ago
- Country of origin: Germany
- Headquarters location: Berlin
- Key people: Martin Haspelmath; Stefan Müller
- Nonfiction topics: Linguistics
- Revenue: Not-for-profit publisher
- Official website: http://langsci-press.org/

Language Science Press (LSP) is an open access scholarly publishing house specializing in linguistics, formally set up in 2014. Language Science Press publishes books on a central storage and archiving server in combination with print on-demand services. Books are published under the Creative Commons CC-BY license as a standard. As of March 2025, the catalog lists 277 books in English, German, Portuguese, Spanish, or Chinese. A total of about 30 books are published every year, including monographs and edited volumes.

== History ==
Language Science Press goes back to the Open Access in Linguistics (OALI) initiative, which was started by Stefan Müller and colleagues at the Free University of Berlin in August 2012. In its preliminary stages, the initiative aimed to find a supporters’ base for Diamond Open Access within the global linguistics community.

In a second phase, a grant proposal was jointly submitted by Martin Haspelmath and Stefan Müller for the call “Open Access Monographs in the Humanities”. Funding came then from the German Research Foundation for the development of a full-fledged business model and its realization (Language Science Press) starting June 2014.

From 2016 to 2018, Language Science Press was sponsored by Humboldt University in Berlin. Later, Language Science Press was supported by 105 institutions worldwide in a first round from 2018 to 2020. A total of 115 institutions are listed as sponsors in a second round from 2020 to 2022.

In 2022, a book they published (A Grammar of Gyeli by Nadine Grimm) won the prestigious Leonard Bloomfield Book Award, as awarded by the Linguistic Society of America.

== Publication process ==
Every book published via Language Science Press goes through a predefined workflow that relies in part on a community of voluntary proofreaders. There are in total five stages:

1. Submission: A first draft of the manuscript is submitted by the author(s) to the respective series's editor(s).
2. Review: At least two reviewers are chosen by the respective series's editor for peer review.
3. Proofreading: Community proofreaders inspect the revised manuscript.
4. Typesetting: A final typographic check is carried out by Language Science Press.
5. Publication: The volume is published and made freely available according to the principles of diamond open access.

Open commentaries and reviews and community proofreading are made possible by PaperHive. Since at least September 2020, Language Science Press has also been using docLoop, which allows for the community feedback to be turned into issues on GitHub. All books are subject to the Generic Style Rules for Linguistics.

== Partnerships ==
Language Science Press has a partnership with Knowledge Unlatched, a global library consortium approach to funding open access books.

The publishing house maintains a list of supporters shown online.

== Digital typography ==
Language Science Press uses the LaTeX editor Overleaf as a platform. To facilitate the typesetting of manuscripts in linguistics and hence the overall publishing process, Language Science Press has also been developing own packages for LaTeX. For example, langsci-avm provides a specialized syntax for typesetting potentially complex attribute-value matrices (AVMs).

The source code of books is available from a GitHub repository.

== See also ==
- University of Hawaiʻi Press
- Open Library of Humanities
