= Stefan Müller =

Stefan Müller or Mueller may refer to:

- Stefan Müller (athlete) (born 1979), Swiss javelin thrower
- Stefan Müller (mathematician) (born 1962), German mathematician
- Stefan Müller (footballer, born 1974), German footballer
- Stefan Müller (footballer, born 1988), German footballer
- Stefan Mueller (soccer, born 1995), American footballer
- Stefan Mueller, a fictional Nazi in the Columbo Season 5 episode "Now You See Him..."
- Stefan Müller (linguist), German linguist
- Stefan Müller (politician) (born 1975)

== See also ==
- Stephen Mueller (1947–2011), American painter
