= Alexander Müller =

Alexander or Alexandre or Alex Müller may refer to:

- Alexandre Müller (born 1997), French tennis player
- K. Alex Müller (1927–2023), Swiss physicist and Nobel laureate
- Alex Müller (racing driver) (born 1979), German racing driver
- Alexander Müller (skeleton racer), Austrian skeleton racer
- Alexander Müller (composer) (1808–1863), German pianist, teacher, conductor and composer
- Alexander Müller (politician) (born 1969), German politician
