= Enrique Muller =

German-American photographer

Enrique Muller (December 1846 - ?) was a German-American photographer for the United States Navy. He was known as the "daredevil photographer" for his unique perspectives when photographing moving ships.

== Biography ==
He was born in December 1846 in Germany. He emigrated to the United States in 1865 and married Mary around 1874. Together they had six children, and two became photographers, Theodore Muller and Robert Enrique Muller.
