= Martina Müller =

Martina Müller may refer to:

- Martina Müller (tennis) (born 1982), German tennis player
- Martina Müller (footballer) (born 1980), German footballer
- Martina Müller, Austrian fashion designer, founder of Callisti label
- Martina Müller, German film historian and co-restorer of the 1955 film Lola Montès
