= Stefan Müller (linguist) =

German linguist (born 1968)

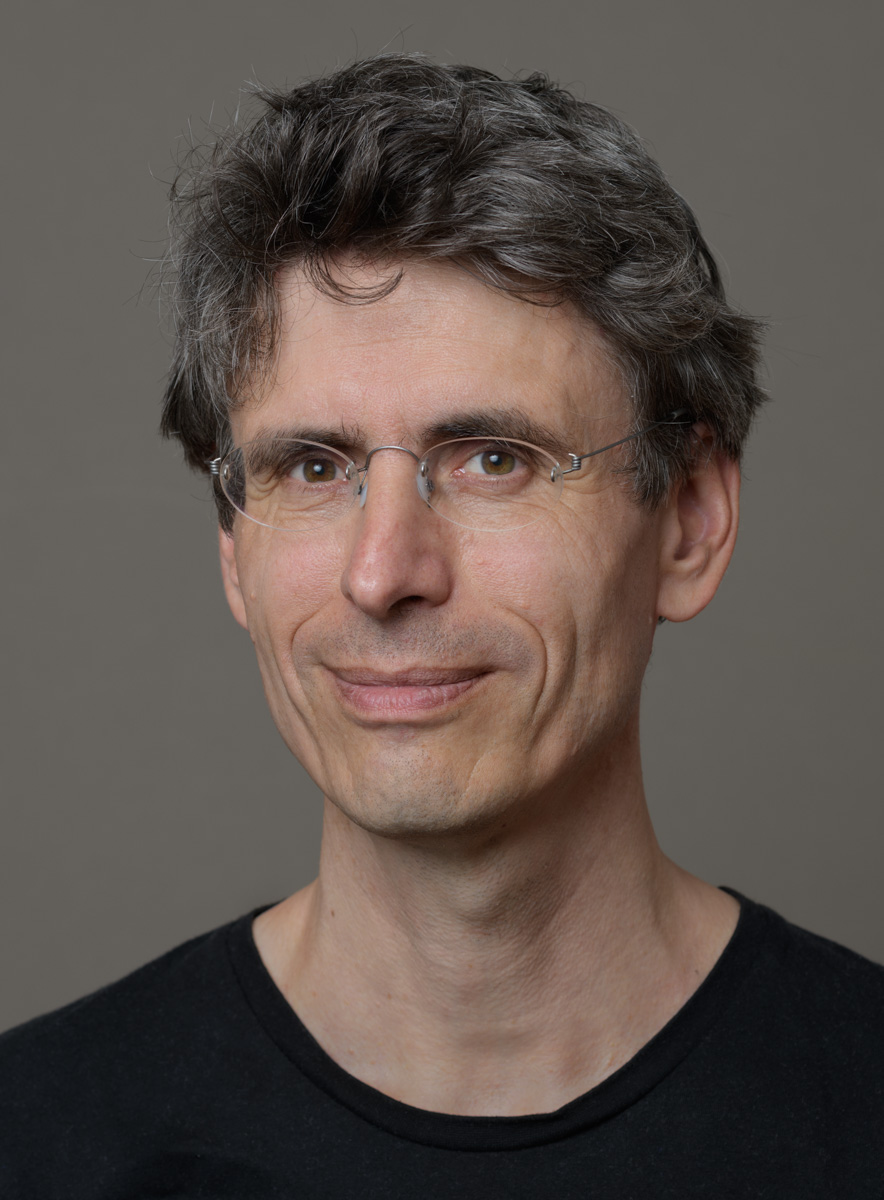
- Born: 1968 (age 57–58); Jena, Thuringia, Germany

Academic background
- Education: Humboldt University of Berlin; University of Edinburgh; Saarland University
- Thesis: Spezifikation und Verarbeitung deutscher Syntax in Head-Driven Phrase Structure Grammar (1997)

Academic work
- Discipline: Computational linguistics
- Sub-discipline: Linguistic typology, Syntactic and morphological theory
- Institutions: Saarland University; University of Bremen; Free University of Berlin; Humboldt University of Berlin
- Website: hpsg.hu-berlin.de/~stefan/index.html.en

Stefan Müller is a professor of linguistics at the Humboldt University of Berlin specializing in syntax, where he is the head of the German Grammar group (German: Arbeitsgruppe Sprachwissenschaft des Deutschen: Syntax).

== Education and career ==
Stefan Müller was born in Jena in 1968, he studied computer science, linguistics, and computational linguistics, artificial intelligence at the Humboldt University and University of Edinburgh. After this he held various research and teaching positions in the public and private sectors, at the Humboldt University, the German Research Center for Artificial Intelligence in Saarbrücken (DFKI), Interprice Berlin (now Semantic Edge), the Friedrich-Schiller University at Jena, the University of Potsdam. He became Juniorprofessor (assistant professor) for theoretical linguistics and computational linguistics at the University of Bremen in 2003 and full professor for German and general linguistics at the Freie Universität, Berlin in 2007. Since 2016 he is full professor for German syntax at the Humboldt-Universität zu Berlin.

Many of his publications and the LaTeX code used to typeset them are open-access. In 2014, he and Martin Haspelmath founded the diamond open access publisher Language Science Press.

He was elected a member of Academia Europaea in 2014.

== Research ==
Müller's research focus is the empirical description of German and other Germanic languages and the theoretical modelling of these descriptive findings, the relation of this work to linguistic typology, and with the use of the Head-driven phrase structure grammar framework. Because of the implications that typological findings have for different analyses of languages and linguistic phenomena, the description and analysis of non-Germanic languages also feature prominently in the programme - Müller himself works with Mandarin, Danish, Maltese, and Persian.

== Publications (selection) ==
=== Books ===
- Müller, Stefan (2023). Germanic syntax: A Constraint-Based View. Textbooks in Language Science 12. Berlin: Language Science Press. doi:10.5281/zenodo.7733033.
- Müller, Stefan (2018). A lexicalist account of argument structure: A discussion of template-based phrasal LFG approaches and a lexical HPSG alternative. Conceptual Foundations of Language Science 2. Berlin: Language Science Press. doi:10.5281/zenodo.1441351.
- Müller, Stefan (2016). Grammatical theory: From transformational grammar to constraint-based approaches. Textbooks in Language Sciences 1 (2nd revised edition 2018, 3rd revised edition 2019, 4th revised edition 2020, 5th revised edition 2023 ed.). Berlin: Language Science Press. doi:10.5281/zenodo.7376662.
- Müller, Stefan (2010). Grammatiktheorie. Stauffenburg Einführungen 20 (2nd revised edition 2013 ed.). Tübingen: Stauffenburg Verlag.
- Müller, Stefan (2007). Head-Driven Phrase Structure Grammar: Eine Einführung. Stauffenburg Einführungen 17 (2nd revised edition 2008, 3rd revised edition 2013 ed.). Tübingen: Stauffenburg Verlag.
- Müller, Stefan (2002). Complex Predicates: Verbal Complexes, Resultative Constructions, and Particle Verbs in German (PDF). Studies in Constraint-Based Lexicalism 13. Stanford, CA: CSLI Publications.
- Müller, Stefan (1999). Deutsche Syntax deklarativ: Head-Driven Phrase Structure Grammar für das Deutsche (PDF). Linguistische Arbeiten 394 (2nd identical edition 2014 by Walter De Gruyter ed.). Tübingen: Max Niemeyer Verlag. doi:10.1515/9783110915990.

=== Articles ===
- Müller, Stefan (2015). "The CoreGram Project: Theoretical Linguistics, Theory Development and Verification". Journal of Language Modelling. 3 (1): 21–86. doi:10.15398/jlm.v3i1.91.
- Müller, Stefan; Wechsler, Stephen (2014). "Lexical Approaches to Argument Structure". Theoretical Linguistics. 40 (1–2): 1–76. doi:10.1515/tl-2014-0001.
- Müller, Stefan (2013). "Unifying Everything: Some Remarks on Simpler Syntax, Construction Grammar, Minimalism and HPSG". Language. 89 (4): 920–950. doi:10.1353/lan.2013.0061.
- Müller, Stefan (2010). "Persian Complex Predicates and the Limits of Inheritance-Based Analyses". Journal of Linguistics. 46 (3): 601–655. doi:10.1017/S0022226709990284.
- Müller, Stefan (2006). "Phrasal or Lexical Constructions?". Language. 82 (4): 850–883. doi:10.1353/lan.2006.0213.
- Müller, Stefan (2005). "Zur Analyse der scheinbar mehrfachen Vorfeldbesetzung". Linguisitische Berichte. 203: 297–330.
- Müller, Stefan (2003). "Mehrfache Vorfeldbesetzung". Deutsche Sprache. 31 (1): 29–62.
- Müller, Stefan (2003). "Solving the Bracketing Paradox: The Morphology of German Particle Verbs". Journal of Linguistics. 39 (2): 275–325. doi:10.1017/S0022226703002032.

== Editorial work (selection) ==
- Müller, Stefan; Abeillé, Anne; Borsely, Robert D.; Koenig, Jean-Pierre, eds. (2021). Head-Driven Phrase Structure Grammar: The Handbook. Empirically Oriented Theoretical Morphology and Syntax 9 (2nd edition 2024 ed.). Berlin: Language Science Press. doi:10.5281/zenodo.5543318.
- Müller, Stefan; Reis, Marga; Richter, Frank, eds. (2018). Beiträge zur deutschen Grammatik: Gesammelte Schriften von Tilman N. Höhle. Classics in Linguistics 2 (2nd revised edition 2019 ed.). Berlin: Language Science Press. doi:10.5281/zenodo.2588383.
- Since 2003 Proceedings of the International Conference on Head-Driven Phrase Structure Grammar https://hpsg-proceedings.org ISSN 1535-1793.

== Trivia ==
His Erdős number is 4.

== Weblinks ==
- Private homepage at the Humboldt University Berlin
- ORCID-Webseite
- Political Blog for the public election for the Bundestag 2021 in which he run for office stefanmueller.bayern
- Blog on climate issues hot-climate-topics.net
- Ost-Blog „So isser der Ossi“ on issues related to East-Germany
