= Detlef Müller (mathematician) =

German mathematician

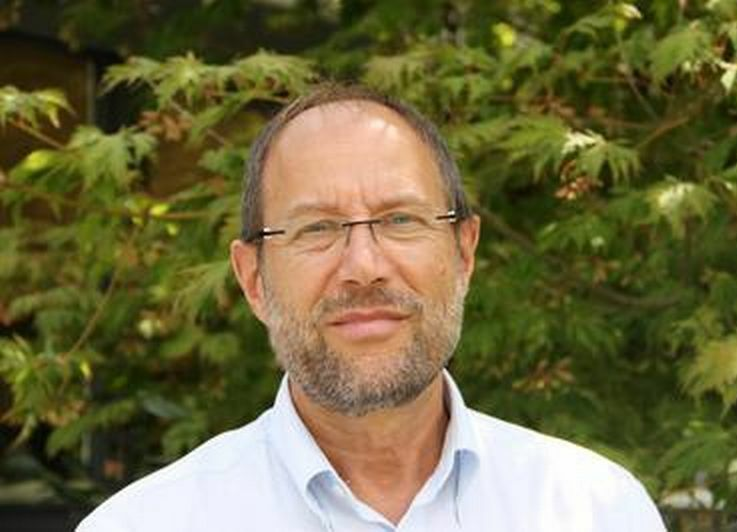
Müller at Oberwolfach, 2014

Detlef Horst Müller (born 13 June 1954 in Dissen, Lower Saxony) is a German mathematician, specializing in analysis.

Müller received 1981 his doctorate from Bielefeld University with thesis Das Syntheseverhalten glatter Hyperflächen mit homogenen Krümmungsverhältnissen im $\mathbb R^n$ (The synthesis behavior of smooth hypersurfaces with homogeneous curvature ratios in $\mathbb R^n$) under the supervision of Horst Leptin (1927–2017). Müller habilitated in 1984 in Kiel. He spent the academic year 1990–1991 at the Institute for Advanced Study. He was from 1992 to 1994 a professor at the Université Louis Pasteur in Strasbourg and is since 1994 a professor at the University of Kiel.

His research deals with harmonic analysis (especially related to Lie groups) with applications to partial differential equations.

In 1998 Müller was an Invited Speaker at the International Congress of Mathematicians in Berlin. He became a Fellow of the American Mathematical Society in the class of 2018. He is a member of the editorial boards of the Journal of Lie Theory and the Annali di Matematica Pura ed Applicata.

== Selected publications ==
- Müller, Detlef (1994). "A homogeneous, globally solvable differential operator on a nilpotent Lie group which has no tempered fundamental solution". Proceedings of the American Mathematical Society. 121: 307–310. doi:10.1090/S0002-9939-1994-1179590-7.
- Muller, Detlef; Ricci, Fulvio (1996). "Solvability for a Class of Doubly Characteristic Differential Operators on 2-Step Nilpotent Groups". The Annals of Mathematics. 143 (1): 1. doi:10.2307/2118651. ISSN 0003-486X. JSTOR 2118651.
- Müller, Detlef; Zhang, Zhenqiu (2001). "Local solvability for positive combinations of generalized sub-Laplacians on the Heisenberg group". Proceedings of the American Mathematical Society. 129 (10): 3101–3108. doi:10.1090/S0002-9939-01-05930-5.
- Müller, Detlef; Peloso, Marco M. (2003). "Non-solvability for a class of left-invariant second-order differential operators on the Heisenberg group". Transactions of the American Mathematical Society. 355 (5): 2047–2065. doi:10.1090/S0002-9947-02-03232-4.
- Müller, D. (2008). "Local solvability of linear differential operators with double characteristics. I. Necessary conditions". Math. Ann. 340 (1): 23–75. arXiv:math/0602378. doi:10.1007/s00208-007-0138-7. S2CID 14294846.
- Ludwig, Jean; Müller, Detlef (2014). "Uniqueness of solutions to Schrödinger equations on 2-step nilpotent Lie groups". Proceedings of the American Mathematical Society. 142 (6): 2101–2118. arXiv:1207.4652. doi:10.1090/S0002-9939-2014-12453-1.
- with Marco Peloso, Fulvio Ricci: Analysis of the Hodge Laplacian on the Heisenberg group, Memoirs of the American Mathematical Society 2016
