= Alfred Müller (entrepreneur) =

Croatian businessman

- Born: 1888; Zagreb, Austro-Hungarian Empire, (now Croatia)
- Died: 1945 (aged 57); Dachau concentration camp
- Cause of death: Murdered in Holocaust
- Spouse: Klara (née Hafner) Müller (Miler)
- Children: Alan (son); Evelina (daughter)
- Relatives: Adolf Müller (father); Leo Müller (brother)

Alfred Müller (from 1938 Miler; 1888 – 1945) was a Croatian entrepreneur and the oldest son of Adolf Müller.

Müller was born in Zagreb to a wealthy Jewish family, with younger brother Leo. He graduated from higher technical school in Vienna. Müller was married to Klara (née Hafner), with whom he had two children, son Alan and daughter Evelina. After his father's death, Müller inherited the "Balkan" cinema and part of a residential-commercial complex on Varšavska and Masarykova Streets. In 1938, because of the political situation and antisemitism caused by Nazi propaganda, Müller and his family converted to Catholicism and changed their surname to Miler. In 1939, Müller sold the residential-commercial complex on Varšavska and Masarykova Streets to a Topić family from Zagreb. That same year, Müller and his family moved to France. During World War II, Müller and his wife were arrested by the Gestapo in France with the help from Vichy Regime, while their daughter managed to save herself by hiding at her friends' house. Müller's son joined the French Resistance. In August 1944, Müller was deported to Dachau concentration camp, where in January 1945 he was killed. Müller's family survived the Holocaust; his wife and daughter moved to the United States after the war, and, in 1949, his son returned and stayed in Zagreb, where he still lives. With the independence of Croatia in 1991, Müller's son sought the return of the property which was taken from his father by the Ustaše and later the communist SFR Yugoslavia.

== Bibliography ==
- Snješka Knežević, Aleksander Laslo (2011). Židovski Zagreb. Zagreb: AGM, Židovska općina Zagreb. ISBN 978-953-174-393-8.
- Kraus, Ognjen (1998). Dva stoljeća povijesti i kulture Židova u Zagrebu i Hrvatskoj. Zagreb: Židovska općina Zagreb. ISBN 953-96836-2-9.
