= Fritz Müller (disambiguation) =

Fritz Müller (1821–1897) was a German biologist active in Brazil.

Fritz Müller may also refer to:

- Fritz Müller (doctor) (1834–1895), Swiss doctor, zoologist, and herpetologist
- Fritz Mueller (1907–2001), German engineer
- Fritz Müller (glaciologist) (1926–1980), Swiss, gave name to Muller Ice Shelf
- Fritz Müller (pilot), former German Luftwaffe flying ace
- Fritz Müller (politician) (1920-2001)
- Fritz Müller (racing driver) (born 1941), German former racing driver in 1993 24 Hours of Le Mans
- Fritz Müller (rugby union), German rugby union player
- Fritz Müller (typographer)
