= Leo Müller =

Croatian industrialist, entrepreneur and philanthropist

- Born: 1894; Zagreb, Austro-Hungarian Empire, (now Croatia)
- Died: 1941 (aged 47); Jasenovac concentration camp
- Cause of death: Murdered in Holocaust
- Spouse: Nada Müller (Miler)
- Relatives: Adolf Müller (father); Alfred Müller (brother)

Leo Müller (from 1938 Miler; 1894–1941) was a Croatian industrialist, entrepreneur, philanthropist and second son of well known Croatian industrialist Adolf Müller.

== Family and personal life ==
Müller was born in Zagreb into the wealthy and influential Jewish family of Adolf Müller. He had an older brother Alfred Müller, also an entrepreneur. Müller was married to Nada (née Spitzer) with whom he had three sons, Marijan, Rajko and Branko. Müller fought in World War I as an officer in the Austro-Hungarian Army. He was a member of the National Council of the State of Slovenes, Croats and Serbs. In 1938, on the eve of World War II, Müller, his brother and their families converted to Catholicism and changed their surname to Miler due to the worsening political situation and rising antisemitism fuelled by Nazi propaganda. In 1939, with his wife and two older sons, Müller moved to London, while his youngest son Branko remained in Zagreb with his governess. At the beginning of World War II, Müller returned to Zagreb for his son. Müller arranged for his son and governess to move to Kosovska Mitrovica where he had a mine. Müller refused to believe that like other Jews he would be arrested and deported to a concentration camp. Cardinal Aloysius Stepinac urged Ante Pavelić to save Müller, but in November, 1941 Müller was killed at the Jasenovac concentration camp. After the war, Müller's wife returned to Zagreb and sought the return of the Müller family’s seized property, but without success. His eldest son, Marijan, made Aliyah to Israel in the 1940s. Müller’s two other sons, Rajko and Branko stayed in Zagreb with their mother. Both of them were gifted athletes. After graduation at the Faculty of Kinesiology at the University of Zagreb, Branko Müller moved to Freiburg where he worked as a professor of athletics.

== Business career ==
The Müller brick factory, Catholic church in front and gathered employees in the group photo.

From his father, Müller inherited the brick factory in Zagreb and brickyard near Karlovac. In the mid-1930, Müller founded the chemical laboratory which would later become the large plantation for planting fruits and vegetables, known as "Müllerov Brijeg". Müller improved the business of the Zagreb brick factory. He was very loved and popular among his employees, for whom he built the Catholic Church in front of the brick factory, organized and provided night school, kitchen with hot meals, and workers orchestra.

== Bibliography ==
- Snješka Knežević, Aleksander Laslo (2011). Židovski Zagreb. Zagreb: AGM, Židovska općina Zagreb. ISBN 978-953-174-393-8.
- Kraus, Ognjen (1998). Dva stoljeća povijesti i kulture Židova u Zagrebu i Hrvatskoj. Zagreb: Židovska općina Zagreb. ISBN 953-96836-2-9.
