= Callisti =

Clothing brand

Callisti is a clothing label founded by Austrian fashion designer Martina Müller in 2007. The name has Greek origins meaning "For the most beautiful."

According to a review by Ma Donna magazine, the September 2012 Callisti collection featured "sexy business suits with refined leather elements, sheath dresses with transparent inserts, billowing elf-robes to leather jackets. Important element: Sturdy zippers, inserted boldly". Callisti identifies its main features as it has continued to develop its collection since 2007 as "sexy, straight and minimal, which emphasizes the female body and its lines. Bringing out each unique woman's own femininity, not disguising it, it is a request to focus and bring out the advantages of the female body."
