= Adolf Müller (politician, born 1916) =

German politician (1916–2005)

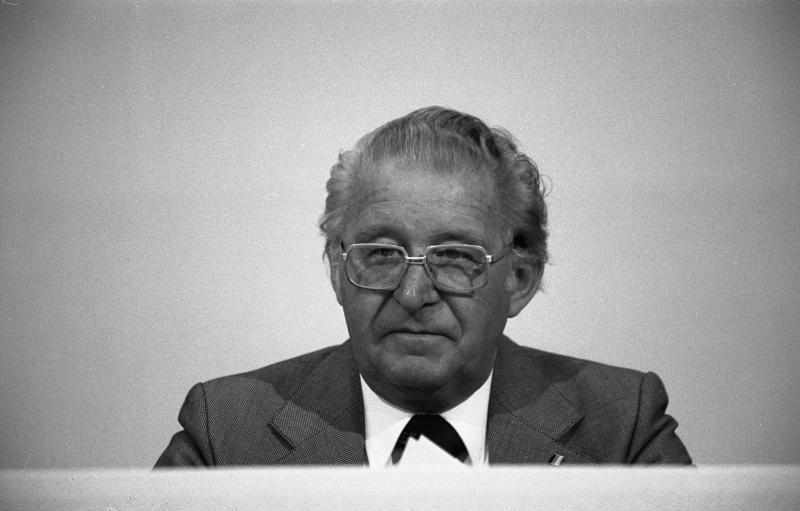
- Adolf Müller (1978)

Member of the Bundestag
- In office 17 October 1961 – 18 February 1987

Personal details
- Born: 13 May 1916
- Died: 22 February 2005 (aged 88)
- Party: CDU

Adolf Müller (May 13, 1916 – February 22, 2005) was a German politician of the Christian Democratic Union (CDU) and former member of the German Bundestag.

== Life ==
Müller joined the CDU in 1945 and was later elected to the state executive of the CDU Rhineland. Müller was a member of the German Bundestag from 1961 to 1987. He had always entered parliament via the North Rhine-Westphalia state list. The social policy expert was Chairman of the Bundestag Committee for Labour from 1965 to 1969 and Deputy Chairman of the Bundestag Committee for Labour and Social Affairs from 1969 to September 1981. From 1981 to 1987 he was deputy chairman of the CDU/CSU parliamentary group in the Bundestag.

== Literature ==
Herbst, Ludolf; Jahn, Bruno (2002). Vierhaus, Rudolf (ed.). Biographisches Handbuch der Mitglieder des Deutschen Bundestages. 1949–2002 [Biographical Handbook of the Members of the German Bundestag. 1949–2002] (in German). München: De Gruyter - De Gruyter Saur. p. 1715. ISBN 978-3-11-184511-1.
