= Daniel Müller (disambiguation) =

Daniel Müller may refer to:

- Dan Muller (1889–1976), American painter
- Dan Muller (basketball) (born 1976), American college basketball player and coach
- Daniel Müller (born 1965), Swiss curler
- Daniel Jobst Müller (born 1965), German scientist
- Daniel Müller-Schott (born 1976), German cellist
- Danny Muller (born 1969), Dutch football player
