= Thomas Müller (disambiguation) =

Thomas Müller (born 1989) is a German footballer.

Thomas Müller may also refer to:

- Thomas Müller (SS officer) (1902–??), German military commander
- Thomas Müller (composer) (born 1939), German conductor, composer, and pianist
- Thomas Müller-Pering (born 1958), German classical guitarist
- Thomas Müller (skier) (born 1961), German skier
- Tom Mueller (born 1961), American aerospace engineer
