= Gottlob Müller =

- Born: 17 March 1895; Kitzingen
- Died: 28 April 1945 (aged 50); Gatow
- Military career
- Allegiance: Nazi Germany
- Branch: Luftwaffe
- Service years: 1914–1945
- Rank: Generalleutnant
- Conflicts: Battle of Berlin †
- Awards: Knight's Cross of the Iron Cross

Gottlob Müller (17 March 1895 – 28 April 1945) was a decorated general in the Luftwaffe of Nazi Germany during World War II. He was a recipient of the Knight's Cross of the Iron Cross which was awarded to recognise battlefield bravery or successful military leadership. Müller was killed during the Battle of Berlin, in the fighting for the Gatow airfield.

== Awards and decorations ==
- Knight's Cross of the Iron Cross on 8 June 1943 as Generalmajor and commanding general and commander-in-chief of Luftgau Tunis
