= Kurt Müller =

Kurt Müller may refer to:

- Kurt Müller (field hockey) (1928–?), Swiss Olympic hockey player
- Kurt Müller (footballer) (born 1948), Swiss former footballer
- Kurt Müller (sport shooter) (born 1934), Swiss sports shooter
- Kurt Müller (officer), commander of the 286th Security Division (Wehrmacht) during World War II
- Kurt Müller (politician), German communist politician
