= Alexander Müller (composer) =

Alexander Müller (1808 – 28 January 1863) was a German pianist, teacher, conductor and composer.

== Biography ==
Alexander Müller was born in Erfurt, and studied with Johann Nepomuk Hummel. In 1833 he met Richard Wagner in Würzburg, and the two men became friends.

In 1834 Müller moved to Zurich, where he worked as a piano teacher, pianist and conductor. He took over the Listesche Singinstitut, founded by Anton List, and established a mixed choir in 1837, the Müllerschen Gesangverein. From 1852 to 1863 Müller served as leader for the General Music Society's subscription concerts series. Richard Wagner took refuge with Müller when he fled after the May uprising in Dresden in 1849 and moved to Zurich.

Müller died in Zurich. Notable students include Fanny Hünerwadel, Wilhelm Baumgartner and Johann Carl Eschmann.

== Works ==
Müller's compositions are mostly lost. However, they included two operas Die Flucht nach der Schweiz (1841) and Die Mühle von St. Alderon oder die beiden Galeriesklaven (1851) that premiered in Zurich. Other compositions include a Tempo di Mazurka, for piano solo
