= Jörg Müller (disambiguation) =

Jörg Müller (born 1969) is a German racing driver.

Jörg Müller or Joerg Mueller may also refer to:

- Jörg Müller (artist) (born 1942), Swiss artist who won the Hans Christian Andersen Award in 1994
- Jörg Müller (cyclist) (born 1961), Swiss former road bicycle racer

== See also ==
- Disappearance of Jorge Müller and Carmen Bueno
