= Herbert Müller =

Herbert Müller may refer to:

- Herbert Müller (handball coach) (born 1962), Romanian-born German handball coach and former handball player
- Herbert Müller (racing driver) (1940–1981), racing driver from Switzerland
- Herbert Müller (field hockey) (1904–1966), German field hockey player
- Herbert Muller (cyclist) (1914–1999), Belgian cyclist
- Herbert J. Muller (1905–1980), American historian, academic, government official and author
