= Alfred Muller =

French politician (1940–2020)

Deputy of the French National Assembly
- In office 28 March 1993 – 21 April 1997
- Preceded by: Jean Oehler (PS)
- Succeeded by: André Schneider (UMP)
- Constituency: Bas-Rhin's 3rd constituency

Mayor of Schiltigheim
- In office 1977–2008
- Preceded by: Paul Schwebel (DVG)
- Succeeded by: Raphaël Nisand (PS)

conseiller général of Schiltigheim Canton
- In office 1998–2004
- Preceded by: Christian Fiegel (DVG)
- Succeeded by: Andrée Munchenbach (Ecologist)

conseiller général of Schiltigheim Canton
- In office 1979–1992
- Preceded by: Jean-Claude Burckel (RPR)
- Succeeded by: Christian Fiegel (DVG)

Personal details
- Born: 23 December 1940 Strasbourg, Bas-Rhin, France
- Died: 13 November 2020 (aged 79)
- Party: DVG (1971-1977), PS (1977-1986), MDA 1986-
- Profession: School teacher, then school headmaster

Alfred Muller (23 December 1940 – 13 November 2020), was a French politician who served as a member of the National Assembly of France from 1993 to 1997.

== Biography ==
Alfred Muller was born on 23 December 1940 in Strasbourg, Bas-Rhin. In 1971 he became non-denominational left-wing (divers gauche) alderman for sports and culture in Schiltigheim (Bas-Rhin), then was elected mayor in 1977 and became soon afterwards member of the Socialist Party (PS). A follower of Michel Rocard's party wing, he was president of the Bas-Rhin PS-linked Federation of Socialists and republican elected officials from 1982 to 1985. He was successfully re-elected as mayor in 1983.

He unsuccessfully took part in the 1981 legislative election in the Bas-Rhin's 4th constituency. In protest against the selection of Grenoble and not of Schiltigheim for the building of the European Synchrotron Radiation Facility, also because he had not been selected as a candidate on the PS list for the next - proportional - 1986 legislative election, he quit the party in 1985. He founded the next year a splinter party, the Alsatian Democracy Movement (MDA) and presented his own list for these elections, getting 26,173 votes (5.98%) and no seat. Two years later, he was the substitute for Catherine Trautmann, PS candidate in the National Assembly's Bas-Rhin's 2nd constituency. Their ticket lost in the runoff by a small margin (49.7%).

In January 1992, Alfred Muller publicly declined to be head of the center-left Presidential Majority (during the presidency of François Mitterrand) list for the regional elections in Bas-Rhin, arguing that the PS refused to withdraw its candidate from a simultaneous cantonal election to let the MDA candidate win it.

He was however endorsed by the PS for the 1993 legislative election, was elected then, but beaten at the next one in 1997. When elected at the National Assembly, he was a member of the group République et liberté, composed of the Left Radicals, the Chevènement's MDC, and other independents, presided over by arch-Conservative Jean Royer.

He was re-elected as mayor in 1989, 1995 and 2001, but retired in 2008. His MDA designated successor, Jean-Marie Kutner, also affiliated with a newly founded splinter party from the PS, Modern Left, was endorsed by the right-wing UMP, but was beaten by a PS list at the 2008 municipal elections. Kutner won the next 2014 elections as the head of a united right-wing list.

Alfred Muller was also elected as conseiller général from 1979 to 1992 for the Schiltigheim Canton, had to leave this function when he became deputy, then was elected again from 1998 until 2004 when he was beaten by an Ecologist candidate, Andrée Munchenbach.

As a mayor, he endorsed Jean-Pierre Chevènement for the 2002 presidential election.

Muller died on 13 November 2020 at the age of 79.
