= Caroline Müller =

Caroline Müller may refer to:

- Caroline Müller (1755–1826) (1755–1826), Danish / Swedish singer
- Caroline Müller (footballer) (born 1989), Swiss football striker
- Caroline Müller (born 1964), pop singer, known as C. C. Catch
