= Adolf Müller (industrialist) =

Croatian industrialist, manufacturer and entrepreneur

- Born: 1857; Zagreb, Austrian Empire, (now Croatia)
- Died: 1932 (aged 75); Zagreb, Kingdom of Yugoslavia
- Spouse: Fanika (née Mühlhofer) Müller
- Children: Alfred Müller (son); Leo Müller (son)

Adolf Müller (1857–1932) was a Croatian industrialist, manufacturer and entrepreneur.

== Background and family ==
Müller was born in Zagreb to a poor Jewish family with many children. Due to lack of money, when he completed the elementary school, Müller was educated for cooper and carpentry craft. At 25, Müller married Fanika Müller (née Mülhofer), from Krapina. Together they had two sons, Alfred and Leo who were both killed during the Holocaust.

== Business career ==
Müller brick factory in Zagreb

In Josipdol, near Ogulin, Müller opened a grocery store and a restaurant. Soon after he bought the store "Zlatni zvon" in Zagreb. Müller was extremely entrepreneurial and motivated, and that store in a short time become one of the best in town. Müller ran his shop for 25 years, later also trading in coal and brick. Müller established a brick factory in Zagreb, and a brickyard near Karlovac. He also owned several brickyards in Kustošija, Zagreb.

== Cultural activity ==
Müller invested his earnings and capital in the Zagreb culture. Around 1913 he financed the construction of "Helios" cinema (now Gavella Drama Theatre). He merged cinemas "Helios", "Apollo", "Union" and film institute "Urania" into one company. In 1919, Müller purchased a residential-commercial complex in Varšavska and Masarykova Street. There, in 1924, Müller financed the construction of "Balkan" cinema (now called "Europa"), under architect Srećko Florschütz.

== Bibliography ==
- Snješka Knežević, Aleksander Laslo (2011). Židovski Zagreb. Zagreb: AGM, Židovska općina Zagreb. ISBN 978-953-174-393-8.
