= Walter Müller =

Walter Müller or Mueller may refer to:

== Sports ==
- Walter Mueller (1894–1971), American baseball player
- Walter Müller (biathlete) (1940–1966), Austrian Olympic biathlete
- Walter Müller (footballer, born 1938) (1938–2018), Swiss footballer
- Walter Müller (footballer, born 1970) (born 1970), Swiss footballer
- Walter Müller (footballer, born 1920) (1920–2010), Swiss footballer
- Walter Müller (footballer, born 1910) (1910–?), Swiss footballer
- Walter Müller (German gymnast) (1930–2021), German Olympic gymnast
- Walter Müller (Swiss gymnast) (born 1940), Swiss Olympic gymnast
- Walter Müller (handballer) (born 1957), Swiss handballer

== Arts and entertainment ==
- Walter Müller (actor) (1911–1969), Austrian film actor
- Walter Andreas Müller (born 1945), Swiss stage and film actor
- Walter Müller (writer), Austrian writer, winner of an award at the 1979 Festival of German-Language Literature

== Other ==
- Walter H. Mueller (?–2011), American politician
- Walter Müller (Panzerjäger) (1914–2003), German army officer
- Walter W. Müller (1933–2024), German specialist in ancient South Arabia and Semitic epigraphy

== See also ==
- Walter Möller (1920–1971), German politician
