= Martin U. Müller =

German journalist

- Born: Berlin, Germany

Martin U. Müller is a German journalist who covers investigative stories at the German news magazine Der Spiegel. He has been a member of the Hamburg-based editorial team since 2009. Müller studied medicine, neuropsychology, and the history of medicine before attending the Henri-Nannen-Schule. His investigative work has focused on high-profile cases including the affair surrounding Federal President Christian Wulff, the deliberate crash of Germanwings Flight 9525, the scandal involving the Bishop of Limburg Franz-Peter Tebartz-van Elst, and the dismissal of Bild editor-in-chief Julian Reichelt. He has received numerous awards for his journalism, among them the Henri Nannen Prize and the Otto-Brenner-Preis.

== Life ==
Müller studied medicine as well as neuropsychology and the history of medicine. He subsequently attended the Henri-Nannen-Schule. Since 2009 he has worked at the Hamburg-based news magazine Der Spiegel.

At Der Spiegel he covers business and media reporting, among other topics, and serves as a jury member for the "Journalist of the Year" award, presented by Medium Magazin. Martin U. Müller is also a lecturer at the Faculty of Law of the University of Freiburg.

Müller regularly engages in investigative journalism. He has reported on the affair surrounding Federal President Christian Wulff and Berlin film financier David Groenewold, on the Jörg Kachelmann legal case, on the scandal involving the Bishop of Limburg, Franz-Peter Tebartz-van Elst, and his first-class upgrades on flights to India, on the background to the insolvency of airline Air Berlin, on the pilot suicide in Germanwings Flight 9525, on the methods of hospital group Asklepios, on the affair surrounding the then editor-in-chief of Bild newspaper, Julian Reichelt, and on sexual abuse involving ride-hailing service Uber. He also regularly reports on grievances in the healthcare system as well as on weaknesses within major corporations, including Lufthansa.

Before joining Der Spiegel, Müller wrote for, among others, the Süddeutsche Zeitung, the Frankfurter Allgemeine Zeitung, and Der Tagesspiegel.

He is a jury member of the Spiegel Student Newspaper Prize and has awarded the "Spiegel Special Prize for the Best Journalistic Achievement" at the Federal Student Newspaper Competition of the Bundesrat.

== Awards ==
In 2022, Müller was awarded the Henri Nannen Prize (Stern Prize) in the category Story of the Year, together with colleagues, for an investigation into Julian Reichelt. In 2021, he received the German Journalism Prize (Deutscher Journalistenpreis) together with two Spiegel colleagues for an international investigation into the state of development of a COVID-19 vaccine. Müller was also honoured with the 1st Prize at the Media Prize for Aerospace and Aviation (Medienpreis Luft- und Raumfahrt) 2018. In 2017, he won 1st place at the Otto-Brenner-Preis together with a team for the investigation Ein krankes Haus. Also in 2017, he was awarded the German Social Prize (Deutscher Sozialpreis). A report by Müller on the future of medicine in the age of digitalisation made the shortlist for the Ernst-Schneider-Preis 2018.

Together with Thomas Tuma, Müller received the 3rd Prize at the Helmut-Schmidt-Journalistenpreis 2011 for the Spiegel article Weltreligion Shoppen. He is a co-recipient, together with a team led by Thomas Tuma, of the Main Prize (Print) of the Friedrich-und-Isabel-Vogel-Preis für Wirtschaftsjournalismus for a four-part series titled Deutschland, deine Reichen.

Further nominations include the German Journalism Prize 2012 in the category Mobility and Logistics for a report on frequent flyers and the Lufthansa HON Circle, the German Journalism Prize 2013 in the category Innovation and Sustainability for a cover story on Big Data, and the German Journalism Prize 2024 for a portrait of Lufthansa CEO Carsten Spohr.

== Works ==
- Post-COVID-Syndrom und Long-COVID. Medizinisch Wissenschaftliche Verlagsgesellschaft, Berlin 2023, ISBN 978-3-95466-698-0.
- Visionäre der Gesundheit. Medizinisch Wissenschaftliche Verlagsgesellschaft, Berlin 2023, ISBN 978-3-95466-767-3.
- Was Ärzte von Journalisten lernen können. Medizinisch Wissenschaftliche Verlagsgesellschaft, Berlin 2020, ISBN 978-3-95466-465-8.
- Wie ein Medienskandal entsteht. Springer Gabler, Wiesbaden 2020, ISBN 978-3-658-27496-2.
- Endlich Zeit (contribution). Penguin Verlag, Munich 2018, ISBN 978-3-328-10271-7.
- Deutschland, Deine Reichen: Wer sind sie – und warum so viele?. Spiegel Verlag, Hamburg 2013.
- Demenz: Was wir darüber wissen, wie wir damit leben. Deutsche Verlags-Anstalt, Munich 2010, ISBN 978-3-421-04487-7.
- Schwarz, Rot, Grau. Altern in Deutschland. Süddeutsche Zeitung, 1st edition, Munich 2008, ISBN 978-3-86615-616-6.
