= Arnold Müller =

Romanian entomologist

- Born: 22 June 1884; Regen, Austria-Hungary
- Died: 11 April 1934 (aged 49); Sibiu, Romania
- Occupations: Entomologist, teacher
- Known for: Orthoptera

Arnold Müller (22 June 1884 – 11 April 1934) was an Austrian entomologist who was born and spent his life in what is now Romania. He is known for his studies of orthoptera and for his contributions to the Transylvanian Association for Natural Sciences.

== Education ==
Arnold Müller was born on 22 June 1884 in Sächsisch-Regen (Reghin). He attended primary school and lower secondary school in Sächsisch Regen. In 1902 he matriculated from the high school in Bistritz and in the fall of 1902 began to study natural sciences in the University of Klausenburg. He went on in the following years to Berlin, Kiel and Vienna, and completed his studies in 1907 in the University of Jena. While a young man he made study trips to northern Germany, Denmark, Scandinavia and Italy.

== Teacher and scientist ==
Müller taught for a probationary year in Sächsisch Regen and earned his teaching diploma, then transferred to the Realschule in Hermannstadt (Sibiu), where he taught from 1908 until his death in 1934. He joined the Transylvanian Association for Natural Sciences (Siebenbürgischen Vereins für Naturwissenschaften) in 1908, and over the years held various positions in the association and made significant contributions. As one of the zoological curators he was in charge of the extensive collection of insects, to which he made contributions of his own collections, including building up the orthoptera collection almost from scratch.

Although Müller was some distance from the major centers of entomology, he always stayed up to date with the latest advances in the field. He studied in the field throughout his life, and maintained contact with many scientific colleagues in other countries. In 1915 Müller obtained his doctorate in zoology from Klausenburger University, and in 1917 he was elected full member of the Royal Hungarian Society for Natural Sciences in Budapest. As a librarian for the Transylvanian Association for Natural Sciences, he reorganized the existing collection of books and magazines. From 1926 he was responsible for publication of the association's magazine, Transactions and Announcements. He introduced demonstration evenings to supplement the lecture evenings, giving opportunities for the custodians to report on their collections and the members to report on their research results. Müller himself gave many scientific lectures and compiled collections and materials for schools to use in scientific teaching free of charge.

Müller devoted the time he had left from his teaching and family to his collection. After Transylvania was annexed to Romania, Müller extended his entomological research to the areas of the lower Danube and Dobruja. He published a detailed study of orthoptera from Dobroja and Bessarabia in 1931–1932. He also made study trips to Egypt, Palestine, Syria and last to Bulgaria. On the trip to Bulgaria he contracted a serious heart defect that led to a long illness and then death. Müller died on 11 April 1934 in Hermannstadt (Sibiu).

== Contributions ==
Müller was an important Transylvanian zoologist whose work was known to entomologists far beyond his homeland in the interwar period. His main interest was in the orthoptera, a class of insects rich in insects like grasshoppers and crickets. He won praise for his great contributions to the Transylvanian Association for Natural Sciences in Sibiu. Its valuable collection of local and foreign orthoptera is one of the treasures of the Natural Science Museum in Sibiu. In 1927 Müller donated a collection of orthoptera to the Museum of Deva in the Hunedoara department. He had captured the specimens between 1901 and 1926 in Transylvania, Banat, Muntenia and the southern Danube. Some specimens were captured in Bulgaria, France and Greece. The collection contains 210 specimens belonging to 73 species, 43 genera and 3 families. In 1958 Maria A Vasiliu and Constantin Agapi published valuable data from the Arnold Müller collection.

Müller's main focus was the entomological fauna of his homeland, Siebenbürgen (Transylvania) and with the specimens he collected in his travels. However, he also contributed to other areas of zoology such as the skulls of birds. He is noted for his studies on the origin and distribution of the Orthoptera of Transylvania (1924), and on the Orthoptera fauna of the Dobruja and Bessarabia (1933). In his investigations Müller included ecological and lifecycle considerations, and investigated the close links between insect and forage plant. He participated in international conferences in Budapest (1927), Cluj (1928) and Paris (1932). In Paris his groundbreaking lecture on "The Post-Ice Age Settlement of Transylvania with Special Consideration of the Orthoptera" was well received. He discovered the rare locust species Chorthippus acroleucus, which is endemic to the Southern Carpathians. In his extensive research trips to Syria, Palestine and Egypt, the French Pyrenees and Turkey, he discovered a large number of new insect species.

== Publications ==
Most of Müller's 25 scientific papers were published in the Verhandlungen und Mitteilungen des Siebenbürgischen Vereines für Naturwissenschaften zu Hermannstadt (Transactions and communications from the Transylvania Society for Natural Sciences in Sibiu), but some works appeared in Hungarian, Austrian and German journals. His published articles include:

- Arnold Müller (1913), "Einige neuere Arbeiten aus der ungarischen Käferfauna (Some recent works on Hungarian beetle fauna)", Zeitschrift für wissenschaftliche Insektenbiologie, 9: 97–104
- Arnold Müller (1915), "Histologie des Darmtraktes und Spermatogenese der Plumatella polymorpha Krpl (Histology of the intestinal tract and spermatogenesis of Plumatella polymorpha Krpl)", Verhandlungen und Mitteilungen des Siebenbürgischen Vereins für Naturwissenschaften zu Hermannstadt, Mitt.der ArbGem. für Naturwissenschaften Sibiu-Hermannstadt, 65: 34–48
- Arnold Müller (1920–21), "Zur Kenntnis der siebenbürgischen Blattwespen (Tenthredinoidea) (Transylvanian wasps (Tenthredinoidea))", Verhandlungen und Mitteilungen des Siebenbürgischen Vereins für Naturwissenschaften zu Hermannstadt, Mitt.der ArbGem. für Naturwissenschaften Sibiu-Hermannstadt, 70: 71: 0001–0021
- Arnold Müller (1926–1927), "Uber drei doppelschwänzige Zauneidechsen der Museumssammlung", Verhandlungen und Mitteilungen des Siebenbürgischen Vereins für Naturwissenschaften zu Hermannstadt, Mitt.der ArbGem. für Naturwissenschaften Sibiu-Hermannstadt, 77 (1): 54–57
- Arnold Müller (1926–1927), "Zur Verbreitung des Procerus gigas Creutz. in Siebenbürgen", Verhandlungen und Mitteilungen des Siebenbürgischen Vereins für Naturwissenschaften zu Hermannstadt, Mitt.der ArbGem. für Naturwissenschaften Sibiu-Hermannstadt, 77 (1): 51–53
- Arnold Müller (1928), "Zur Kenntnis der Fauna der Schlangeninsel", Verhandlungen und Mitteilungen des Siebenbürgischen Vereins für Naturwissenschaften zu Hermannstadt, Mitt.der ArbGem. für Naturwissenschaften Sibiu-Hermannstadt, 78 (1): 133–140
- Arnold Müller (1929–1930), "Zur Kenntnis der Insektenfauna der Süddobrudscha und Südbessarabiens", Verhandlungen und Mitteilungen des Siebenbürgischen Vereins für Naturwissenschaften zu Hermannstadt, Mitt.der ArbGem. für Naturwissenschaften Sibiu-Hermannstadt, 79–80 (1): 167–187
- Arnold Müller (1931–1932), "Zur Kenntnis der Orthopterenfauna der Dobrudscha und Bessarabiens (The Orthoptera fauna of Dobruja and Bessarabia)", Verhandlungen und Mitteilungen des Siebenbürgischen Vereins für Naturwissenschaften zu Hermannstadt, Mitt.der ArbGem. für Naturwissenschaften Sibiu-Hermannstadt, 81–82 (1): 72–96

== Sources ==
- Barth, Hans, 18. Naturwissenschaft und Technik (in German), Landesgruppe Baden Württemberg
- Burnaz, Silvia (1993), "Specii de ortoptere in colectia entomologicà a Muzeului judetean Deva (Hunedoara)" (PDF), Bul.inf. Soc.lepid.rom., 4 (3), ISSN 1221-5244
- Ebner, Richard [in French] (1935), "Dr. Arnold Müller" (PDF), Konowia (in French), Vienna
- "Müller, Arnold", Biographies of the Entomologists of the World
- "Müller, Arnold", Kulturportal West-Ost (in German), Kulturstiftung
- Pisica, Elena Iulia; Petrescu, Angela (2005), "Contributions To The Knowledge Of Orthoptera And Mantids Fauna (Insecta: Orthoptera And Dictyoptera) From Romania" (PDF), Muzeul Olteniei Craiova. Oltenia. Studii Si Comunicari. Stiintele Naturii, XXI, ISSN 1454-6914
- Tatu, Alexandru Ioan; Tausan, Ioan (2011), Armoured crickets (Orthoptera: Tetigonidae, Bradyporinae) in the Natural History Museum Collections of Sibiu (Romania) (PDF)
- "Untersuchungen über die Zoogeographie der Karpathen", Siebenbuergische Zietung: 8, 15 January 2003
