= Ludwig Müller (disambiguation) =

Ludwig Müller (1883–1945) was a German theologian

Ludwig Müller may also refer to:

- Ludwig Müller (general) (1892–1972), German World War II general
- Ludwig Müller (runner) (1932–2022), German Olympic athlete
- Ludwig Müller (footballer) (1941–2021) German international football player

== See also ==
- Ludvig Müller (1868–1922), Norwegian actor
