= Richard Müller =

Richard Müller/Muller/Mueller may refer to:

- Richard Müller (chemist) (1903–1999), German chemist
- Richard Müller (general) (1891–1943), German general and Knight's Cross recipient
- Richard Müller (singer) (born 1961), Slovak singer
- Richard Müller (socialist) (1880–1943), German socialist, unionist and one of the main protagonists of the German Revolution in 1918
- Richard A. Muller (born 1944), physicist and professor
- Richard Muller (theologian) (born 1948), Reformation scholar, and professor
- Richard R. Muller, professor of airpower history
- Richard S. Muller (born 1933), American professor of electrical engineering
- Richard Müller (artist), professor at the Dresden Academy of Fine Arts
- Richard Mueller, screenwriter on TV series such as Hypernauts
