= Franz Müller-Gossen =

German painter

- Born: 1871; Mönchengladbach, Germany
- Died: 16 March 1946 (aged 74–75)

Franz Müller-Gossen (1871 – 16 March 1946) was a German painter from Mönchengladbach, Germany. He studied in Düsseldorf and is known for realistic maritime paintings showing sailing ships and steamships, sailing the high seas or by in bad weather conditions. Although he did not receive any fame while living, maritime art connoisseurs in Europe and in the United States have grown interested in his works.

Four paintings, including Dampfer in bewegter See (Steamship in agitated sea) and Vollschiff unter Segeln (Clipper downwind), have been visible in the Warleberger Hof city museum (Schleswig-Holstein, Germany) since 1990.
