= Dirk Müller =

Dirk Müller may refer to:

- Dirk Müller (artist) (born 1946), Dutch sculptor
- Dirk Müller (cyclist) (born 1973), German cyclist
- Dirk Müller (racing driver) (born 1975), German Ford Performance factory racing driver
- Dirk Müller (stock trader) (born 1968), German stock trader, fund manager and bestseller author
