= Sophie Müller =

German actress

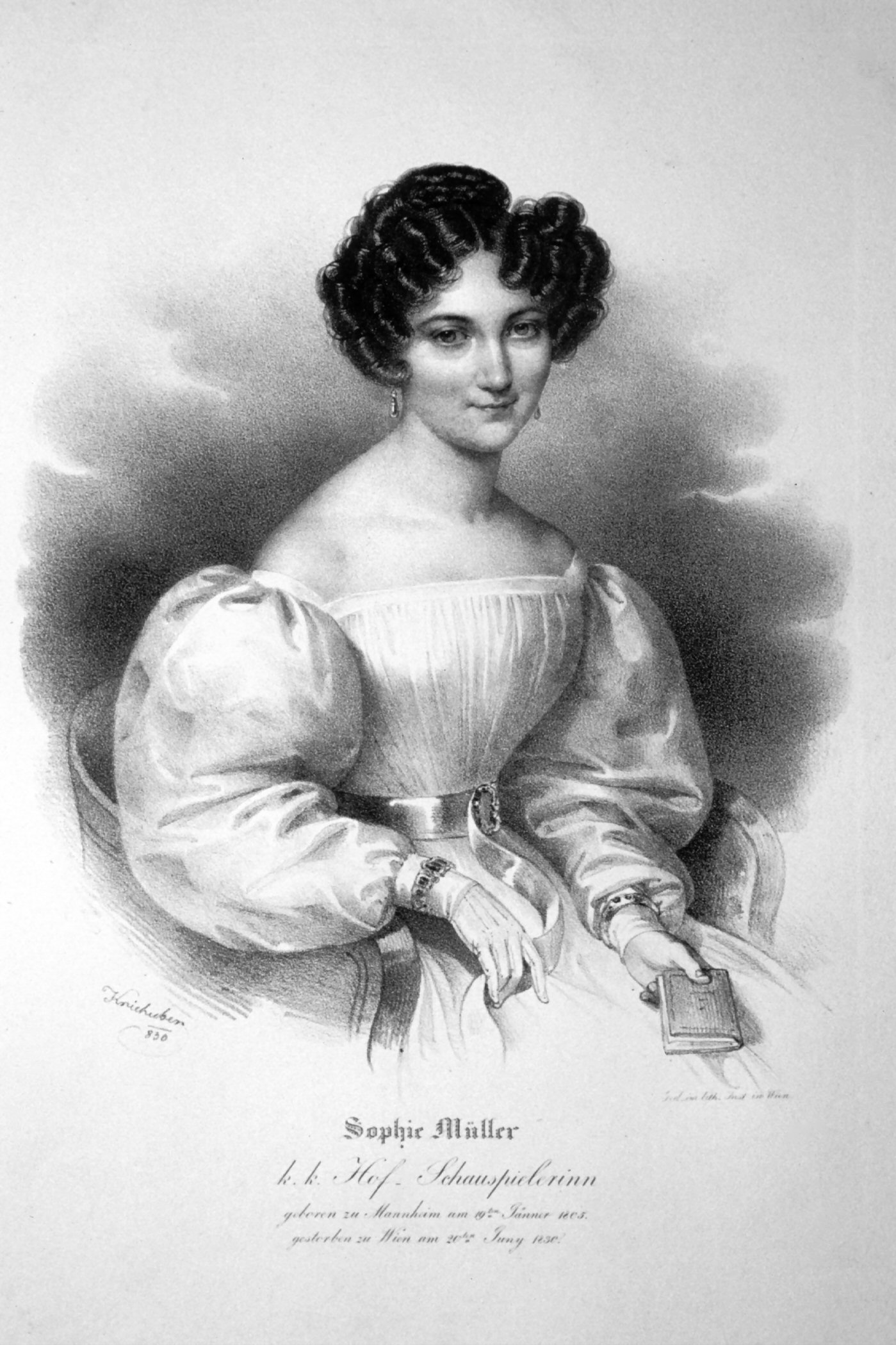
Sophie Müller, a lithograph by Josef Kriehuber, 1830.

Sophie Müller (19 January 1803 in Mannheim – 20 June 1830 in Hietzing) was a German stage actress, one of the most distinguished tragedians of her day.

== Biography ==
She was a daughter of Mannheimer Hoftheater actor Karl Müller (1783–1837) and the singer Marie Boudet. At the age of three years, she was appearing on the stage, and at five she appeared as Hännschen in August von Kotzebue’s Erbschaft. In 1816, her talent was noticed by Johanna Schopenhauer, and she appeared on the Karlsruhe stage in her 15th year. In 1821 she went to Munich, and in 1822 she appeared in Braunschweig.

Though her appearance in Braunschweig was unsuccessful, she was engaged at the court theatre (German: Burgtheater) of Vienna that same year, debuting on 5 August 1822 as Rutland in Essex, which she had performed earlier in Mannheim to much applause. She also became reader to the empress of Austria.

Her most notable roles were Chrimhild (Raupach’s Nibelungen), Lady Milfort (Shiller's Kabale und Liebe), Rosaura (Leben ein Traum), Ophelia, Preciosa, Semiramis (Raupach’s Tochter der Luft), Portia, Zaire, Hedwig and Juliet (Romeo and Juliet). After her death, a portrait of her as Princess Eboli was hung in the court theatre's hall of outstanding performers. Her biography, by Mailath, was published at Vienna in 1832.
