= Gerhard Müller =

Gerhard Müller may refer to:

== Theologians ==
- Gerhard Müller (Lutheran theologian) (1929–2024), German Lutheran theologian
- Paul-Gerhard Müller (1940–2016), German Catholic theologian and priest
- Gerhard Ludwig Müller (born 1947), German Catholic cardinal and Prefect Emeritus of the Congregation for the Doctrine of the Faith

== Other people ==
- Gerhard Friedrich Müller (1705–1783), historian and pioneer ethnologist
- Gerhard Mueller (engineer) (1835–1918), or Müller, New Zealand surveyor, engineer and land commissioner
- Gerhard Müller (rower) (born c. 1930s), German rower
- Gerhard Müller (geophysicist) (1940–2002), German geophysicist
- Gerhard Müller (politician) (1928–2020), German teacher and politician

== See also ==
- Gerard Muller (1861–1929), Dutch Impressionist painter
- Gerd Müller (disambiguation)
