= Gerd Müller (disambiguation) =

Gerd Müller (1945–2021) was a German footballer.

Gerd Müller may also refer to:

- Gerd A. Müller (1932–1991), German industrial designer
- Gerd B. Müller (born 1953), Austrian theoretical biologist
- Gerd Müller (politician) (born 1955), German politician
- Gerd Müller Trophy, annual association football award

== See also ==
- Gerard Muller (1861–1929), Dutch Impressionist painter
- Gerhard Müller (disambiguation)
