= Johannes Müller (politician, born 1880) =

German politician

Mayor of Marburg
- In office 17 May 1927 – 28 March 1933
- Preceded by: Georg Voigt

Personal details
- Born: 1880 Kingdom of Saxony, German Empire
- Died: 1964 (aged 83–84)
- Party: CDU

Johannes Müller (1880–1964) was a German politician and from 17 May 1927 until 28 March 1933 as mayor of Marburg. He later became a member of the Christian Democratic Union of Germany.

Preceded by Georg Voigt	Mayor of Marburg; 17 May 1927 – 28 March 1933	Succeeded by vacant
