= Federal Network Agency =

Federal agency of Germany

- Bundesnetzagentur

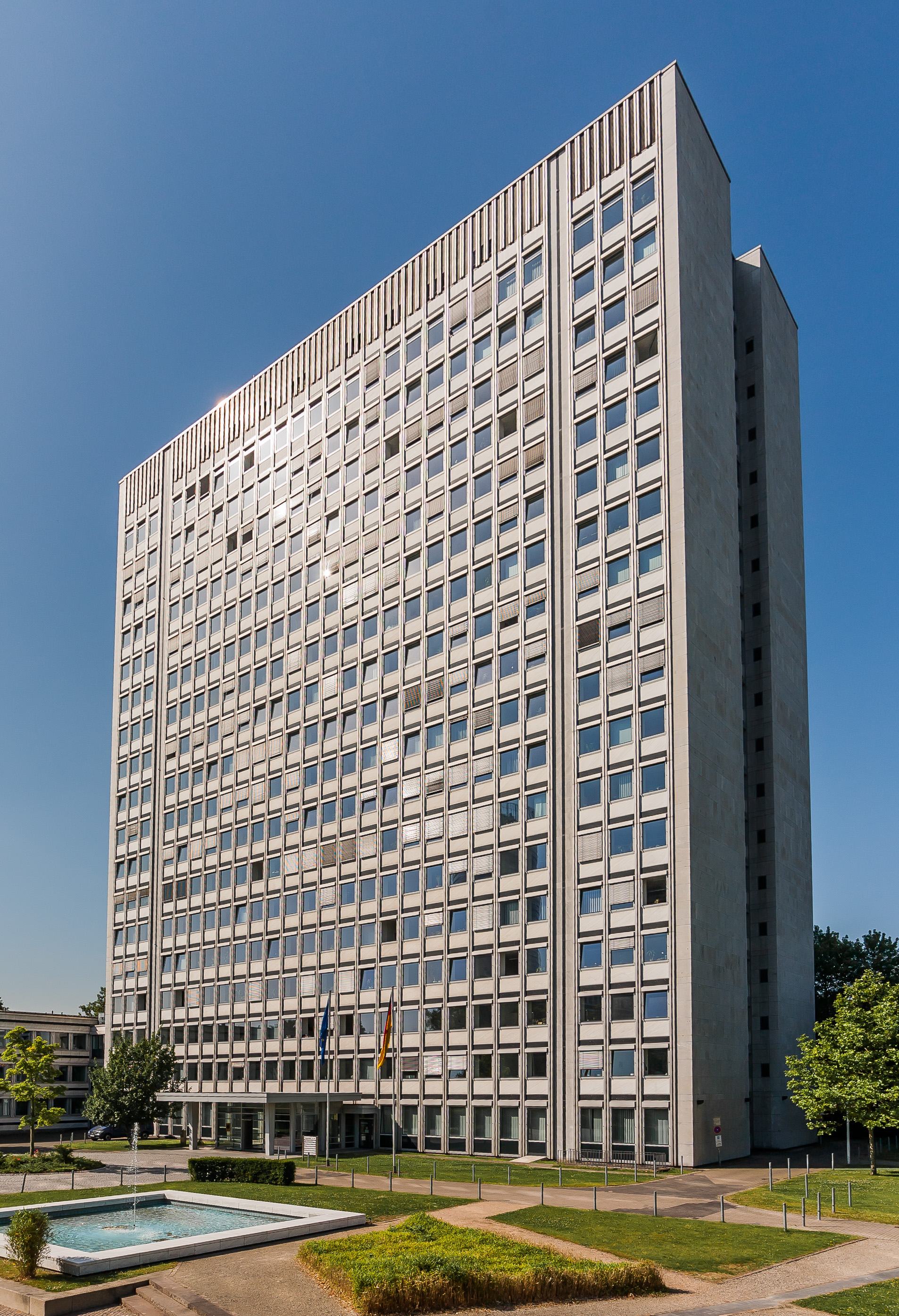
- Headquarters in Bonn

Federal agency overview
- Formed: January 1, 1998
- Preceding Federal agency: Federal Ministry of Post and Telecommunications
- Jurisdiction: Government of Germany
- Headquarters: Bonn, Germany; 50°42′53.6″N 7°7′27.1″E
- Employees: 3,033
- Federal agency executive: Klaus Müller, President
- Parent Federal agency: German Federal Ministry of Economic Affairs and Energy
- Website: www.bundesnetzagentur.de/EN/Home/home_node.html

The Federal Network Agency (German: Bundesnetzagentur or BNetzA) is the German regulatory office for electricity, gas, telecommunications, post and railway markets. It is a federal agency of the Federal Ministry for Economic Affairs and Energy and headquartered in Bonn, Germany.

== Responsibilities ==
=== Telecommunications ===
In telecommunications, the agency has the authority over the German telephone numbering plan and other technical number assignments. It also regulates the telecommunication market, including termination fees and open access to subscriber lines and licenses telephone companies.

In radio communications, the Agency manages the radio frequency spectrum, licenses broadcasting transmitters and detects radio interferences. Licensing radio and TV stations (that is, content providers), however, is the task of State authorities.

It is also a root certificate authority for qualified signatures according to the German Signature Act.

=== Postal services ===
The Agency's responsibility in the post market include the licensing of companies for postal services and the observation of the market. It also regulates the market, assuring non-discriminatory access to some service facilities, such as PO boxes.

=== Electricity and gas ===
In the electricity and gas market, the Agency is responsible for ensuring non-discriminatory third-party access to networks and regulating the fees. The Agency is not responsible for licensing energy companies. These tasks remain with authorities determined by State law.

The Bundesnetzagentur has the following roles under the Renewable Energy Sources Act (EEG):

- determining the level of financial payment for installations for the generation of electricity from renewable energy sources
- monitoring the nationwide EEG equalisation scheme process between the distribution network operators, the transmission system operators and the electricity suppliers
- publishing the capacity of the newly installed renewable energy installations (monthly)
- conducting the auction process for renewable energy installations.

=== Railway ===
In the area of railway traffic, the Federal Network Agency is responsible for ensuring non-discriminatory access to railway infrastructure. This includes monitoring and regulating the train schedules, allocation of railway track slots, access to service facilities, etc.

The agency is not responsible for technical supervision and licensing of railway companies. These tasks remain with the Federal Railway Office (Eisenbahn-Bundesamt, EBA).

== History ==
In the 1990s, the telecommunications and postal services in Germany were privatized. In 1994, the Deutsche Bundespost, was privatised and split into Deutsche Post and Deutsche Telekom, which remained under the supervision of the Federal Office for Post and Telecommunications (Bundesamt für Post und Telekommunikation, BAPT). When the market was finally opened to competitors on 1 January 1998, the Regulatory Authority for Telecommunications and Posts (Regulierungsbehörde für Telekommunikation und Post, RegTP) was established, superseding the Federal Office as the supervisor for posts and telecommunications.

When the government decided to improve competition for the energy and railway markets as of 13 July 2005 and 1 January 2006, it found that the Regulatory Authority's expertise in enabling open access to telecommunication networks would also be useful in these infrastructure markets. To reflect these new competences, the authority was renamed to Federal Network Agency for Electricity, Gas, Telecommunications, Posts and Railway (Bundesnetzagentur für Elektrizität, Gas, Telekommunikation, Post und Eisenbahnen, BNetzA).

To comply with the 2022 EU Digital Services Act, the agency appointed a Digital Services Coordinator (DSC). The DSC is responsible for designating "trusted flaggers"—entities tasked with identifying illegal content. According to agency president Klaus Müller, this also includes monitoring for hate speech and misinformation. Online platforms are required to prioritize reports from these flaggers. In October 2024, the "Respect!" office, part of the Jugendstiftung Baden-Württemberg, was appointed as the first trusted flagger. The project receives funding from the Federal Ministry of Family Affairs, Senior Citizens, Women and Youth through the "Demokratie leben!" program.

== Governance ==
=== Presidents ===
- Klaus-Dieter Scheurle (1998–2000)
- Matthias Kurth (2001–2012)
- Jochen Homann (2012–2022)
- Klaus Müller (2022–present)

=== Advisory Council ===
The Advisory Council consists of 16 members of the German Bundestag and 16 representatives of the German Bundesrat; the Bundesrat representatives must be members or political representatives of the government of a federal state. The members and deputy members of the Advisory Council are appointed by the federal government upon the proposal of the German Bundestag and the German Bundesrat.

== See also ==
- SMARD data portal
