= Hans Müller (lawyer) =

German lawyer (1906–after 1947)

Senatspräsident Hans Müller
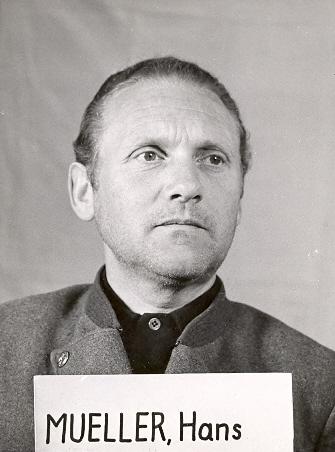
- Müller as a witness during the Nuremberg Trials
- Born: 18 September 1906; Gießen
- Died: after 1947
- Education: Bavarian Assesor
- Title: Personal assistant to the Reichsleiter Martin Bormann
- Political party: NSDAP
- Criminal status: denazified
- Partner: married
- Children: 2 (born in 1937 and 1939)

Hans Müller (born 18 September 1906 in Giessen; died after 1947) was a German lawyer. Müller was the personal assistant to the head of the Nazi Party Chancellery, Martin Bormann, and a judge at the People's Court.

== Early life and career ==
After attending school, Müller studied law. Since his traineeship in 1929, he has been a civil servant in the administration of justice. In the same year, Müller became a district court judge in Berlin. In 1932 he passed the Bavarian assessor examination. In the following years he was employed in the judicial service as a public prosecutor, district court judge, President of the Senate and higher regional court judge.

== National Socialism ==
During the Nazi era, Müller worked at the Kammergericht. With effect from 1 May 1937 he joined the NSDAP. He was also a judge at the People's Court. At the end of July 1940, Müller was transferred to the Reichskommissariat Niederlande, until he was recalled to Munich in the spring of 1941 to work in the legal department of the NSDAP headquarters.

In August 1942, Müller joined the Nazi Party Chancellery, where he initially became a member of staff in the constitutional law department of the Justice Group, which initially reported to Ministerial Counsellor Herbert Klemm, then Secretary of state Gerhard Klopfer.

When Reichsleiter Martin Bormann replaced his previous assistant, Kurt-Walter Hanssen, with Müller in the summer of 1943, he was promoted to the position of Bormann's personal advisor and office manager.

He was evacuated from Berlin to Berchtesgaden in April 1945. After Hitler's death was announced on 1 May 1945, Müller, in consultation with the head of the stenographic service at the Führer Headquarters, Kurt Peschel, decided to destroy all the stenographic documents of the military briefings from September 1942 to April 1945 that had been brought to Berchtesgaden. The SS then took the documents to a small village behind the Königsee, where they were set on fire.

== Post-war period ==
At the end of the Second World War, Müller was taken prisoner of war by the British in Munich. As a result, he was questioned as a witness at the Nuremberg trials by the deputy chief prosecutor of the United States at the Nuremberg trials against the main war criminals, including Robert Kempner.

After his release, he was de-Nazified. He later continued to work in the judiciary. Müller was friends with Helmut von Hummel, another of Bormann's assistants, until his death. It is not known exactly when Müller died.

== Bibliography ==
- Mikael Nilsson (2020), Hitler Redux: The Incredible History of Hitler's So-Called Table Talks, Routledge, ISBN 978-1-00-017329-1
