= Klaus Müller (politician) =

German politician (born 1971)

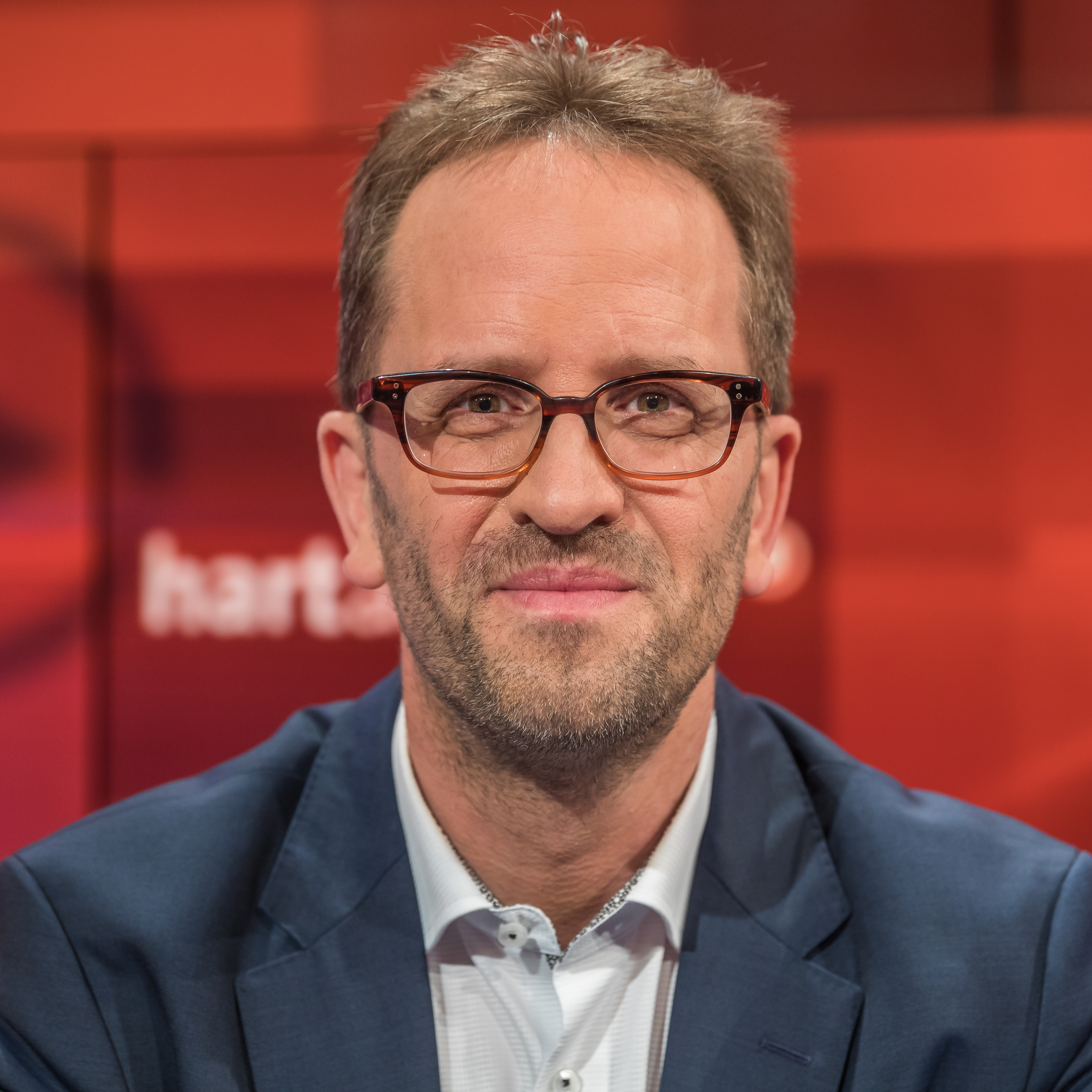
- Müller in 2022

President of the Federal Network Agency
- Incumbent
- Assumed office 1 March 2022
- Preceded by: Jochen Homann

Personal details
- Born: 21 February 1971 (age 55)
- Party: Alliance 90/The Greens

Klaus Wolfgang Müller (born 21 February 1971) is a German politician serving as president of the Federal Network Agency since 2022. From 1998 to 2000, he was a member of the Bundestag. From 2000 to 2005, he served as minister of environment of Schleswig-Holstein. From 2005 to 2006, he was a member of the Landtag of Schleswig-Holstein. From 2021 to 2022, he served as president of the European Consumer Organisation.
