= Henry J. Muller (CERDEC) =

United States Army general

Henry J. Muller, Jr.
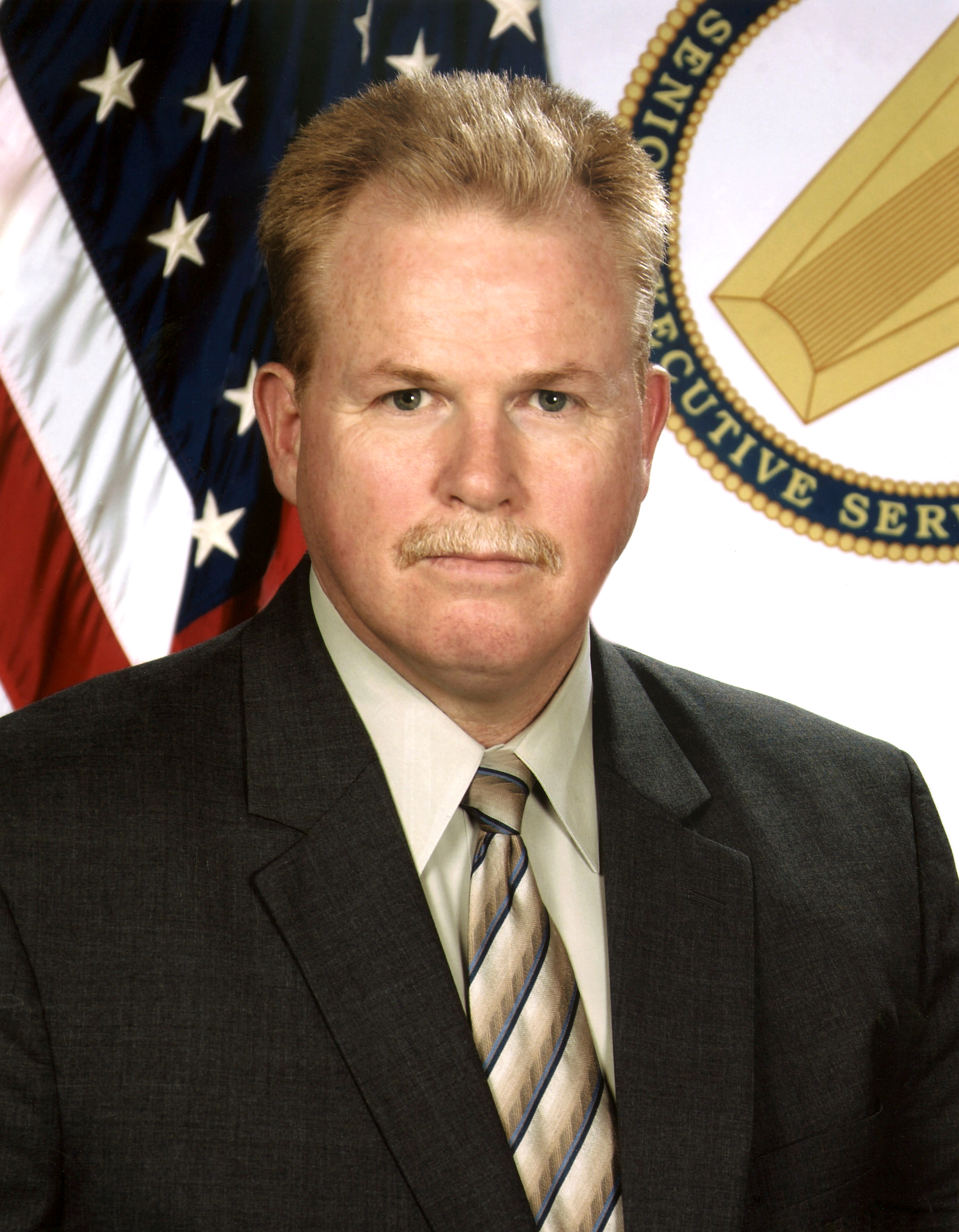
- Portrait of Henry J. Muller, Jr.

Henry J. Muller, Jr. served as the third commanding general of the U.S. Army Research, Development and Engineering Command (CERDEC). He was appointed to this position on April 22, 2015. He retired from this position on March 31, 2017, after "almost 33 years of service to the United States".

He does not appear to be related to former Brigadier General Henry J. Muller Jr. as this man's father died in the 1980s.
