= Robert Enrique Muller =

American photographer

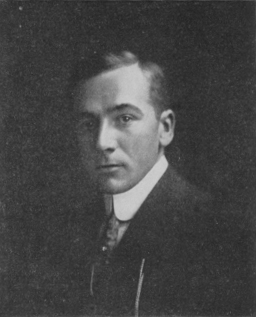
- Muller circa 1913
- Born: Robert Enrique Muller; September 1881; New York
- Died: 1921 possibly California
- Other names: Enrique Müller, Jr.; Enrique Muller, Jr.; E. Muller
- Parent: Enrique Muller

Robert Enrique Muller (September 1881 – 1921) sometimes credited as Enrique Muller, Jr. and as E. Muller, was an official photographer for the United States Navy, and an author. He took photos of military ships in action.

== Biography ==
He was born in New York City in September 1881 or 1882 to photographer Enrique Muller and his wife, Mary. His father had worked in the post office in Kiel in Germany, and migrated to the United States and lived New York City. Father, Enrique Muller and his two children, Robert and Theodore operated a photographic studio in New York City. The family lived in Brooklyn, New York City in 1900. He photographed the 1901 America's Cup and sent copies of his photographs to Wilhelm II, German Emperor. The Kaiser thanked the photographer, by sending him a pair of gold cufflinks.

Robert married Caroline around 1912 and they had two children, Virginia C. Muller and Robert T. Muller. In 1912 he published Battleships of the U.S. Navy, and in 1913 Risks of Photographing Battle-Ships in Action.

He was declared bankrupt on December 23, 1915 by the United States District Court for the Southern District of New York.

In 1917 he published The United States Navy. By 1920 they had moved to Los Angeles, California. He died in 1921.

== Works ==
- The United States Navy (1917)
- Risks of Photographing Battle-Ships in Action (1913)
- Battleships of the U.S. Navy (1912)
