= Klaus Müller (economist) =

German economist (1944–2026)

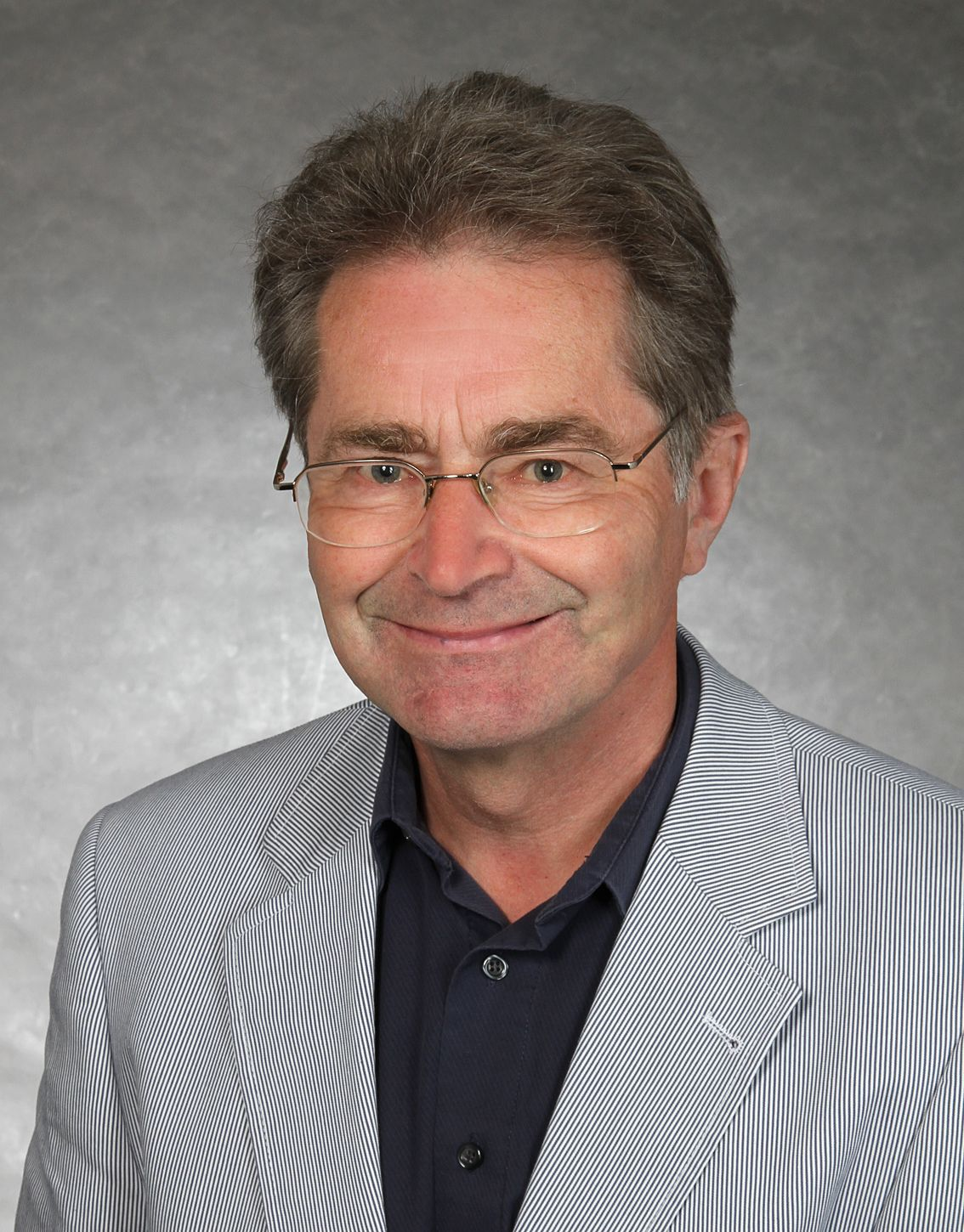
Müller in 2010

Klaus Müller (10 August 1944 – 3 March 2026) was a German Marxian economist and academic. His research and writings focused on Marxist money theory.

== Life and career ==
Klaus Müller was born on 10 August 1944 in Ursprung, which is nowadays a part of Lugau in Gau Saxony. After graduating from the Extended Secondary School in Stollberg in 1963, Müller studied financial and international economics at the Hochschule für Ökonomie Berlin. In 1973, he obtained a doctorate there on the economic evaluation of long-term development variants in the example of the energy sector. He habilitated on theories of income distribution at Martin Luther University Halle-Wittenberg in 1978.

Between 1972 and 1991 Müller taught in the economics department of Technische Hochschule Karl-Marx-Stadt (now Chemnitz University of Technology), from 1984 on as a professor of political economy. Since 1991 he worked as a freelance lecturer for business studies and political economy, from 1997 to 2016 as an external lecturer for external and internal accounting at Chemnitz University of Technology. Between 2000 and 2009 he led the study program on medium-size businesses at Staatliche Studienakademie Glauchau. Since 2009 he worked there as an external visiting professor.

He published over 20 books and around 400 articles and essays in various political and economical journals and newspapers.

Müller died on 3 March 2026, at the age of 81, after long, serious illness.

== Research and positions ==
Müller criticized and rejected the Marx interpretation of Michael Heinrich and other proponents of Neue Marx-Lektüre as well as the neo-Ricardianism of Piero Sraffa. His application of Marx's theory of money to the modern two-tier banking system is considered a major contribution to Marxist monetary theory.

According to Holger Wendt, Müller is, together with Stephan Krüger, one of the two leading German-language Marxist theorists of money. Müller considered the relevance of Marx's contributions to value theory and money theory comparable to the relevance of Newton's laws in physics or Mendeleev's periodic table in chemistry, writes Dogan Michael Ulusoy.
