= Johann Müller =

Johann Müller may refer to:

- Regiomontanus (1436–1476), German mathematician, astronomer, astrologer, translator, instrument maker and Catholic bishop
- Johann Müller (composer) (fl. 1640–c. 1670), German composer and organist
- Johann Friedrich Theodor Müller (1821–1897), German biologist and physician who emigrated to southern Brazil
- Johann Gotthard von Müller (1747–1830), German line engraver
- Johann Heinrich Jakob Müller (1809–1875), German physicist
- Johann Helfrich von Müller (1746–1830), German engineer; inventor of the difference engine
- Johann Jakob Müller (1846–1875), Swiss physiologist and physicist
- Johann Jakob Müller (philosopher) (1650–1716), German moral philosopher
- Johann Wilhelm von Müller (1824–1866), German ornithologist and explorer
- Johann Müller Argoviensis (1828–1896), Swiss botanist
- Johann Müller (footballer) (1912–1984)

== See also ==
- Johann Muller (rugby union) (born 1980), South African Rugby Union player
- Johannes Müller (disambiguation)
- Hans Müller (disambiguation)
- Johanna Müller-Hermann (1878–1941), Austrian composer
