= Walther Otto Müller =

German botanist (1833–1887)

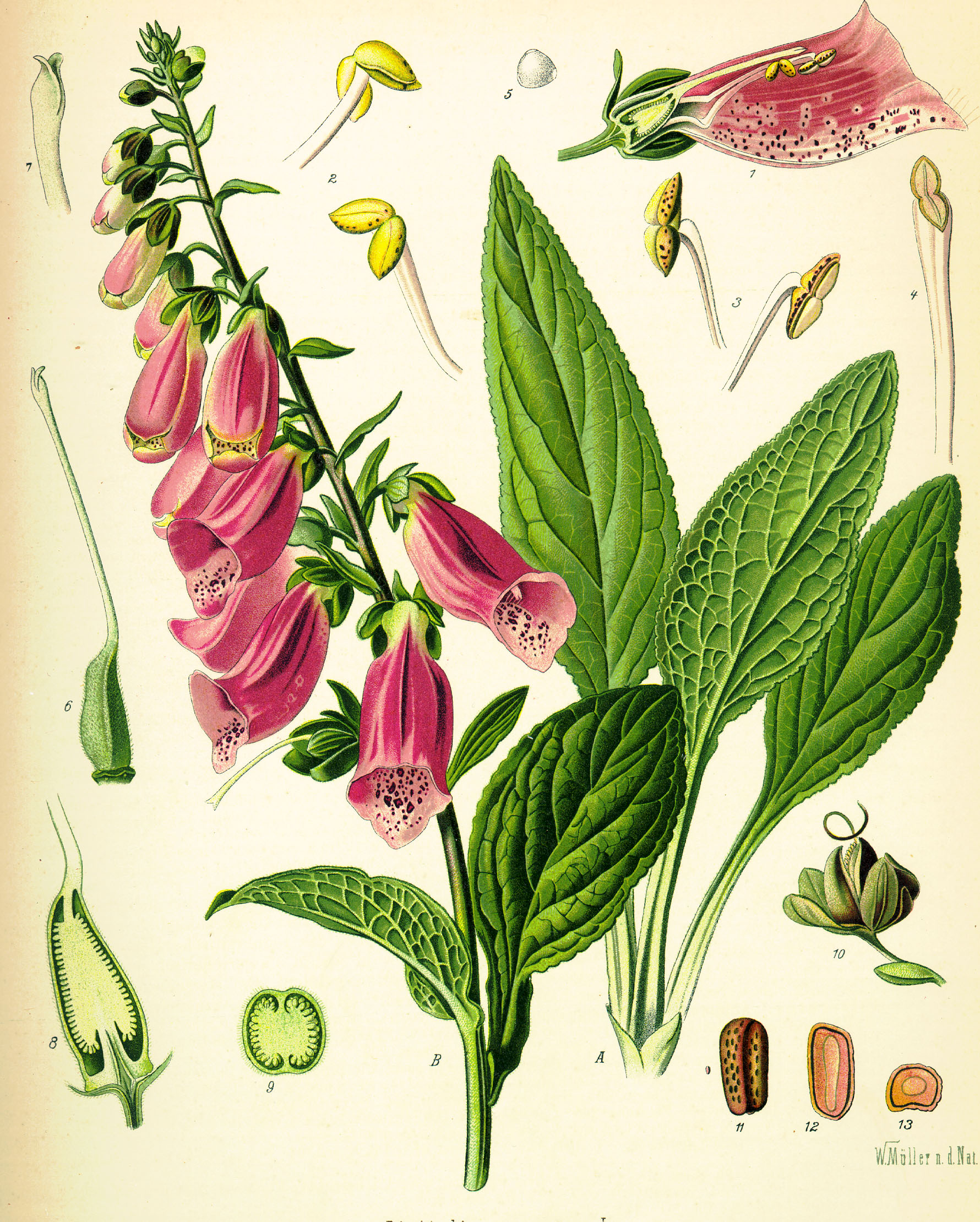
Digitalis purpurea Illustrated and lithographed by Walter Müller from Gera

Walther Otto Müller, also Otto Müller, (20 June 1833 – 17 July 1887, in Gera) was a German botanist and gardner. He was mainly interested in Cryptogamae, in particular lichen and mosses. Müller was the author of some books and several articles in scientific and botanical journals. He monochrome illustrated at least one. He collected plants, lichen and mosses for herbaria to sell the exsiccates as loose-leaf-collections. Several of these exsiccatae issued by him are known, among them Die Cladoniaceen von Nord-Deutschland, herausgegeben von W. O. Müller and Landwirthschaftliches Herbarium.

The topography of the Gera region provided flora and fauna from lowland and highland at one rich spot. Some of his specimens are housed at the British Museum.

Some confuse him with:

- Walther Müller, German lithographer in Gera, who somewhen changed the spelling to Walter Müller, complete name Wilhelm Walter Müller (1845-1927), working from 1870 to 1919 as an illustrator, lithographer who produced botanical and anatomical drawing, lithography, chromolithography and hand-colouring, marking with italics WM or WMüller (VIAF-ID: 236205928).
- Otto Müller, German botanist in Berlin, complete name Georg Ferdinand Otto Müller (1837-1917), who collected and studied algae (Diatomaceae, Bacillariaceae) from 1870 up to 1912. He has the taxonomic author abbreviation O.Müll. (VIAF ID: 295723048).
- Otto Müller, German botanist in Breslau (nowadays Wrocław), who did research in the field of plant physiology of vine 1887.

== Works ==
- Flora der Reussischen Länder und deren nächster Umgebungen (1863)
- Cryptogamen-Flora enthaltend die Abbildung und Beschreibung der vorzüglichsten Cryptogamen Deutschlands. - Gustav Pabst and Walther Otto Müller - Gera, C.B. Griesbach, 1874-1877. 3 parts in 1 volume. Large 4to (33 x 24.5 cm). With 12 numbered lithographed plates by C. Bollmann (Gera) in part 1 which was written jointly by Pabst and Müller; several wood engravings in text and 25 (numbered 23) chromolithographed plates by J.G. Bach (Leipzig) in part 2; illustrations by Müller and Pabst - 1 lithographed and 8 numbered chromo-lithographed plates by Franz Dietsch (Gera) in part 3. Parts 2 and 3 were written by Pabst.
