= Henry J. Muller =

American military officer (1917–2022)

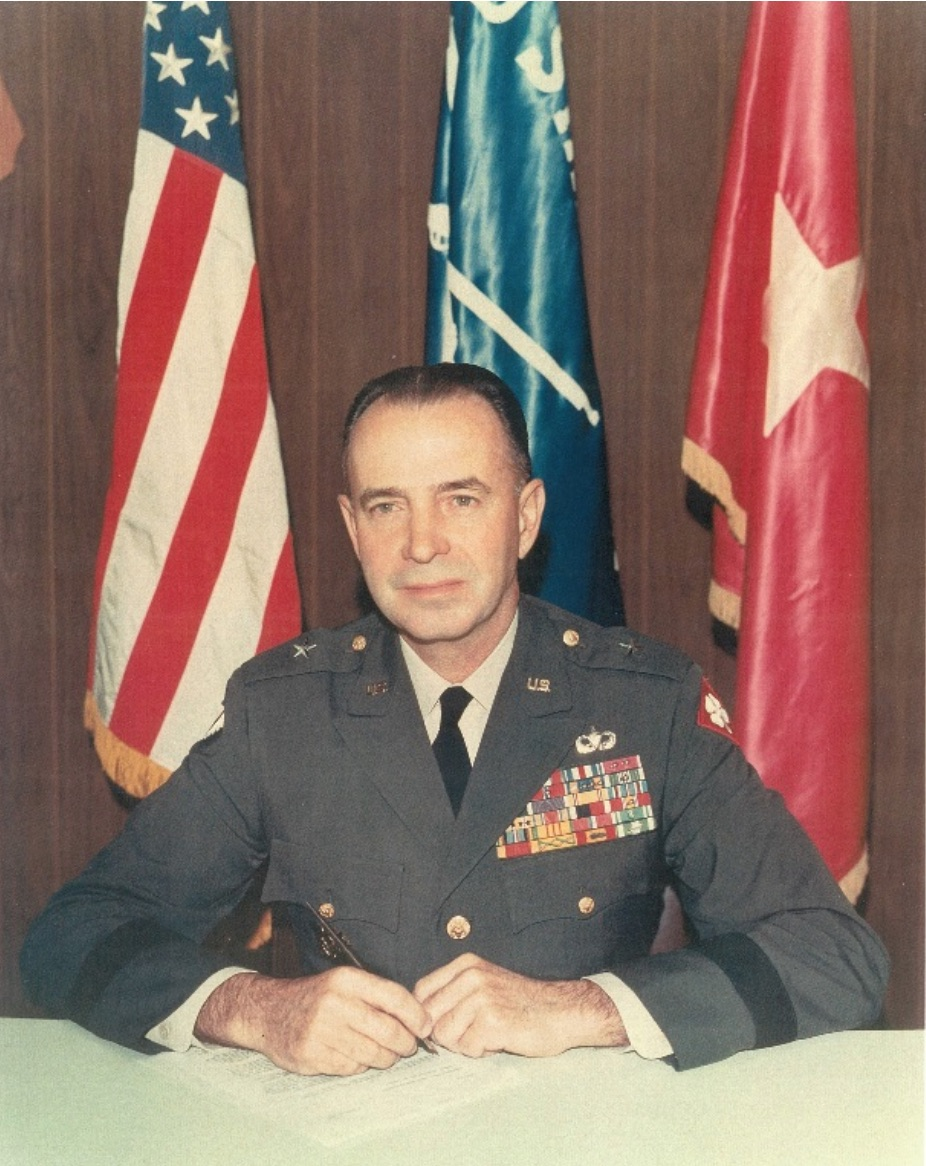
- Muller in the 1960s
- Born: April 7, 1917; Philadelphia, Pennsylvania, U.S.
- Died: January 31, 2022 (aged 104); California, U.S.
- Military career
- Allegiance: United States of America
- Branch: United States Army
- Rank: Brigadier general
- Conflicts: World War II; Vietnam War

Henry John Muller Jr. (April 7, 1917 – January 31, 2022) was an American soldier who served during World War II in the United States Army with the 11th Airborne Division between 1944 and 1945. During the Vietnam War, he served as assistant division commander of the 101st Airborne Division and as deputy senior adviser to the Vietnamese I Corps commander, Lieutenant General Lam. Muller served as the assistant division commander of the 101st until September 12, 1969.

In 2016, his wife Cathryn C. Muller died. She had studied Spanish with her husband and subsequently accompanied him on three diplomatic assignments to El Salvador, Panama, and Argentina. Cathryn Muller was a mother to Henry J. Muller III and Robert A. Muller. Henry Muller died in California on January 31, 2022, at the age of 104.
