= List of minor planets: 412001–413000 =

The following is a partial list of minor planets, running from minor-planet number 412001 through 413000, inclusive. The primary data for this and other partial lists is based on JPL's "Small-Body Orbital Elements" and data available from the Minor Planet Center. Critical list information is also provided by the MPC, unless otherwise specified from Lowell Observatory. A detailed description of the table's columns and additional sources are given on the main page including a complete list of every page in this series, and a statistical break-up on the dynamical classification of minor planets.

Also see the summary list of all named bodies in numerical and alphabetical order, and the corresponding naming citations for the number range of this particular list. New namings may only be added to this list after official publication, as the preannouncement of names is condemned by the Working Group for Small Bodies Nomenclature of the International Astronomical Union.

Near-Earth obj.	MBA (inner)	MBA (outer)	Centaur
Mars-crosser	MBA (middle)	Jupiter trojan	Trans-Neptunian obj.
Unclassified

== 412001–412100 ==
Designation			Discovery			Properties		Ref
Permanent	Provisional	Named after	Date	Site	Discoverer(s)	Category	Diam.	Ref
412001	2012 KV_{35}	—	October 14, 2009	Mount Lemmon	Mount Lemmon Survey	URS	3.5 km	MPC · JPL
412002	2012 KB_{36}	—	September 18, 2009	Kitt Peak	Spacewatch	·	2.1 km	MPC · JPL
412003	2012 KG_{44}	—	November 16, 2009	Mount Lemmon	Mount Lemmon Survey	EOS	2.2 km	MPC · JPL
412004	2012 LN_{7}	—	March 26, 2006	Kitt Peak	Spacewatch	·	3.5 km	MPC · JPL
412005	2012 LT_{26}	—	January 30, 2006	Kitt Peak	Spacewatch	·	3.7 km	MPC · JPL
412006	2012 MU	—	March 26, 2010	WISE	WISE	·	4.1 km	MPC · JPL
412007	2012 MS_{7}	—	April 19, 2006	Catalina	CSS	·	4.5 km	MPC · JPL
412008	2012 PU_{16}	—	January 7, 2006	Mount Lemmon	Mount Lemmon Survey	H	670 m	MPC · JPL
412009	2012 RB_{2}	—	October 12, 2007	Catalina	CSS	H	570 m	MPC · JPL
412010	2012 TC_{19}	—	April 25, 2000	Kitt Peak	Spacewatch	·	2.6 km	MPC · JPL
412011	2012 TX_{230}	—	January 15, 2005	Kitt Peak	Spacewatch	·	1.5 km	MPC · JPL
412012	2012 XB_{111}	—	September 10, 2007	Kitt Peak	Spacewatch	DOR	2.9 km	MPC · JPL
412013	2012 XX_{119}	—	February 14, 2008	Catalina	CSS	H	630 m	MPC · JPL
412014	2013 AE_{17}	—	November 17, 2006	Kitt Peak	Spacewatch	EOS	2.6 km	MPC · JPL
412015	2013 AV_{19}	—	September 10, 2001	Socorro	LINEAR	H	640 m	MPC · JPL
412016	2013 AO_{127}	—	December 18, 2007	Mount Lemmon	Mount Lemmon Survey	EOS	2.2 km	MPC · JPL
412017	2013 AQ_{169}	—	April 24, 2003	Kitt Peak	Spacewatch	·	3.3 km	MPC · JPL
412018	2013 BQ_{20}	—	February 2, 2000	Socorro	LINEAR	H	650 m	MPC · JPL
412019	2013 BX_{39}	—	December 25, 2005	Mount Lemmon	Mount Lemmon Survey	·	1.2 km	MPC · JPL
412020	2013 CT_{9}	—	March 8, 2009	Mount Lemmon	Mount Lemmon Survey	·	2.4 km	MPC · JPL
412021	2013 CR_{17}	—	January 23, 2006	Kitt Peak	Spacewatch	·	770 m	MPC · JPL
412022	2013 CD_{22}	—	February 27, 2008	Mount Lemmon	Mount Lemmon Survey	H	400 m	MPC · JPL
412023	2013 CE_{33}	—	January 28, 2009	Catalina	CSS	HNS	1.3 km	MPC · JPL
412024	2013 CX_{35}	—	March 31, 2008	Catalina	CSS	H	450 m	MPC · JPL
412025	2013 CE_{37}	—	January 7, 2006	Kitt Peak	Spacewatch	·	800 m	MPC · JPL
412026	2013 CO_{37}	—	October 28, 2008	Mount Lemmon	Mount Lemmon Survey	·	1.7 km	MPC · JPL
412027	2013 CU_{64}	—	January 31, 2006	Mount Lemmon	Mount Lemmon Survey	·	740 m	MPC · JPL
412028	2013 CP_{79}	—	January 5, 2000	Kitt Peak	Spacewatch	H	580 m	MPC · JPL
412029	2013 CK_{84}	—	February 5, 2013	Kitt Peak	Spacewatch	·	1.2 km	MPC · JPL
412030	2013 CK_{109}	—	April 7, 2006	Anderson Mesa	LONEOS	·	1.2 km	MPC · JPL
412031	2013 CA_{112}	—	October 26, 2008	Kitt Peak	Spacewatch	·	800 m	MPC · JPL
412032	2013 CJ_{113}	—	May 9, 2010	Siding Spring	SSS	·	2.2 km	MPC · JPL
412033	2013 CV_{117}	—	October 7, 2008	Mount Lemmon	Mount Lemmon Survey	·	710 m	MPC · JPL
412034	2013 CX_{143}	—	April 12, 1994	Kitt Peak	Spacewatch	·	540 m	MPC · JPL
412035	2013 CX_{144}	—	October 20, 2011	Mount Lemmon	Mount Lemmon Survey	·	570 m	MPC · JPL
412036	2013 CO_{153}	—	March 23, 2006	Mount Lemmon	Mount Lemmon Survey	·	930 m	MPC · JPL
412037	2013 CW_{163}	—	March 18, 2010	Kitt Peak	Spacewatch	·	720 m	MPC · JPL
412038	2013 CM_{173}	—	November 24, 2011	Mount Lemmon	Mount Lemmon Survey	·	1.2 km	MPC · JPL
412039	2013 CT_{173}	—	October 1, 2008	Kitt Peak	Spacewatch	·	560 m	MPC · JPL
412040	2013 CU_{184}	—	October 24, 2011	Mount Lemmon	Mount Lemmon Survey	·	820 m	MPC · JPL
412041	2013 CK_{191}	—	October 9, 2007	Mount Lemmon	Mount Lemmon Survey	·	1.4 km	MPC · JPL
412042	2013 CF_{202}	—	February 27, 2006	Kitt Peak	Spacewatch	MAS	610 m	MPC · JPL
412043	2013 DK_{1}	—	April 8, 2010	Kitt Peak	Spacewatch	·	700 m	MPC · JPL
412044	2013 DW_{2}	—	June 14, 2010	Mount Lemmon	Mount Lemmon Survey	·	1.1 km	MPC · JPL
412045	2013 DD_{7}	—	March 23, 2003	Kitt Peak	Spacewatch	·	700 m	MPC · JPL
412046	2013 DX_{8}	—	March 25, 2010	Kitt Peak	Spacewatch	·	670 m	MPC · JPL
412047	2013 DV_{11}	—	January 14, 2010	Kitt Peak	Spacewatch	H	550 m	MPC · JPL
412048	2013 EB_{3}	—	April 10, 2010	Mount Lemmon	Mount Lemmon Survey	·	770 m	MPC · JPL
412049	2013 ES_{7}	—	January 26, 2006	Mount Lemmon	Mount Lemmon Survey	·	590 m	MPC · JPL
412050	2013 EW_{9}	—	June 2, 2005	Catalina	CSS	·	1.7 km	MPC · JPL
412051	2013 ED_{10}	—	October 9, 2007	Socorro	LINEAR	V	790 m	MPC · JPL
412052	2013 EG_{13}	—	October 12, 2007	Kitt Peak	Spacewatch	NYS	1.1 km	MPC · JPL
412053	2013 EH_{13}	—	November 5, 2005	Kitt Peak	Spacewatch	·	810 m	MPC · JPL
412054	2013 EE_{20}	—	February 1, 2005	Kitt Peak	Spacewatch	H	490 m	MPC · JPL
412055	2013 ES_{21}	—	December 31, 2008	Kitt Peak	Spacewatch	·	1.2 km	MPC · JPL
412056	2013 EE_{26}	—	February 20, 2006	Kitt Peak	Spacewatch	·	860 m	MPC · JPL
412057	2013 EB_{27}	—	September 28, 2003	Kitt Peak	Spacewatch	·	1.4 km	MPC · JPL
412058	2013 EF_{31}	—	November 19, 2004	Kitt Peak	Spacewatch	V	740 m	MPC · JPL
412059	2013 EF_{38}	—	February 25, 2006	Kitt Peak	Spacewatch	·	1.0 km	MPC · JPL
412060	2013 EL_{40}	—	March 25, 2000	Kitt Peak	Spacewatch	·	600 m	MPC · JPL
412061	2013 EV_{40}	—	February 2, 2006	Mount Lemmon	Mount Lemmon Survey	PHO	760 m	MPC · JPL
412062	2013 EX_{62}	—	May 6, 2006	Mount Lemmon	Mount Lemmon Survey	·	1.0 km	MPC · JPL
412063	2013 ED_{80}	—	March 21, 2010	Mount Lemmon	Mount Lemmon Survey	·	550 m	MPC · JPL
412064	2013 EJ_{80}	—	September 28, 2011	Mount Lemmon	Mount Lemmon Survey	·	700 m	MPC · JPL
412065	2013 ET_{86}	—	January 8, 2006	Mount Lemmon	Mount Lemmon Survey	·	770 m	MPC · JPL
412066	2013 EV_{90}	—	October 22, 2011	Kitt Peak	Spacewatch	·	1.1 km	MPC · JPL
412067	2013 EJ_{92}	—	May 7, 2010	WISE	WISE	·	2.2 km	MPC · JPL
412068	2013 ED_{102}	—	March 25, 2006	Kitt Peak	Spacewatch	·	940 m	MPC · JPL
412069	2013 EN_{108}	—	January 16, 2009	Kitt Peak	Spacewatch	NYS	930 m	MPC · JPL
412070	2013 EM_{111}	—	October 16, 2007	Mount Lemmon	Mount Lemmon Survey	·	1.3 km	MPC · JPL
412071	2013 EG_{119}	—	January 22, 2006	Mount Lemmon	Mount Lemmon Survey	·	770 m	MPC · JPL
412072	2013 EX_{119}	—	November 3, 2007	Kitt Peak	Spacewatch	·	1.3 km	MPC · JPL
412073	2013 EB_{120}	—	April 20, 2006	Catalina	CSS	NYS	1.1 km	MPC · JPL
412074	2013 ET_{120}	—	March 5, 2006	Kitt Peak	Spacewatch	·	890 m	MPC · JPL
412075	2013 EU_{120}	—	May 29, 2000	Prescott	P. G. Comba	·	2.0 km	MPC · JPL
412076	2013 EK_{121}	—	April 5, 2000	Socorro	LINEAR	·	730 m	MPC · JPL
412077	2013 EN_{122}	—	March 5, 2002	Kitt Peak	Spacewatch	·	980 m	MPC · JPL
412078	2013 EP_{127}	—	April 4, 2010	Kitt Peak	Spacewatch	·	600 m	MPC · JPL
412079	2013 ES_{127}	—	February 7, 2006	Mount Lemmon	Mount Lemmon Survey	·	1.3 km	MPC · JPL
412080	2013 FA_{1}	—	January 2, 2009	Mount Lemmon	Mount Lemmon Survey	·	2.4 km	MPC · JPL
412081	2013 FF_{1}	—	September 24, 1995	Kitt Peak	Spacewatch	H	490 m	MPC · JPL
412082	2013 FG_{4}	—	September 12, 2007	Catalina	CSS	·	1.1 km	MPC · JPL
412083	2013 FF_{13}	—	October 23, 2006	Mount Lemmon	Mount Lemmon Survey	·	2.1 km	MPC · JPL
412084	2013 FQ_{15}	—	October 25, 2008	Kitt Peak	Spacewatch	·	670 m	MPC · JPL
412085	2013 FE_{16}	—	April 7, 2006	Kitt Peak	Spacewatch	NYS	890 m	MPC · JPL
412086	2013 FU_{16}	—	November 2, 2000	Socorro	LINEAR	H	680 m	MPC · JPL
412087	2013 FE_{17}	—	May 8, 2006	Mount Lemmon	Mount Lemmon Survey	V	690 m	MPC · JPL
412088	2013 FY_{17}	—	September 28, 2011	Mount Lemmon	Mount Lemmon Survey	·	640 m	MPC · JPL
412089	2013 FV_{18}	—	March 31, 2013	Mount Lemmon	Mount Lemmon Survey	·	1.6 km	MPC · JPL
412090	2013 FB_{19}	—	March 23, 2006	Mount Lemmon	Mount Lemmon Survey	·	770 m	MPC · JPL
412091	2013 FY_{19}	—	November 7, 2007	Kitt Peak	Spacewatch	·	1.2 km	MPC · JPL
412092	2013 FH_{20}	—	March 25, 2006	Kitt Peak	Spacewatch	V	580 m	MPC · JPL
412093	2013 FL_{20}	—	January 15, 2009	Kitt Peak	Spacewatch	MAS	710 m	MPC · JPL
412094	2013 FV_{20}	—	April 29, 2006	Kitt Peak	Spacewatch	V	550 m	MPC · JPL
412095	2013 FC_{21}	—	March 2, 2006	Kitt Peak	Spacewatch	·	890 m	MPC · JPL
412096	2013 FZ_{21}	—	April 26, 2000	Kitt Peak	Spacewatch	·	1.6 km	MPC · JPL
412097	2013 FF_{23}	—	March 25, 2006	Kitt Peak	Spacewatch	·	870 m	MPC · JPL
412098	2013 FR_{23}	—	October 15, 2001	Kitt Peak	Spacewatch	·	770 m	MPC · JPL
412099	2013 FX_{24}	—	February 28, 2009	Kitt Peak	Spacewatch	MAS	670 m	MPC · JPL
412100	2013 FT_{25}	—	February 10, 2002	Socorro	LINEAR	·	1.1 km	MPC · JPL

== 412101–412200 ==
back to top

Designation			Discovery			Properties		Ref
Permanent	Provisional	Named after	Date	Site	Discoverer(s)	Category	Diam.	Ref
412101	2013 FL_{26}	—	November 12, 2010	Mount Lemmon	Mount Lemmon Survey	BAR	1.4 km	MPC · JPL
412102	2013 GD_{5}	—	October 19, 2006	Kitt Peak	Spacewatch	·	1.1 km	MPC · JPL
412103	2013 GY_{5}	—	October 9, 2010	Mount Lemmon	Mount Lemmon Survey	BRG	1.2 km	MPC · JPL
412104	2013 GK_{6}	—	January 31, 2009	Kitt Peak	Spacewatch	·	930 m	MPC · JPL
412105	2013 GJ_{7}	—	October 30, 2011	Mount Lemmon	Mount Lemmon Survey	·	900 m	MPC · JPL
412106	2013 GE_{8}	—	March 23, 2009	XuYi	PMO NEO Survey Program	BAR	1.2 km	MPC · JPL
412107	2013 GD_{9}	—	October 13, 1999	Kitt Peak	Spacewatch	MAS	760 m	MPC · JPL
412108	2013 GB_{10}	—	April 22, 1998	Kitt Peak	Spacewatch	·	1.1 km	MPC · JPL
412109	2013 GH_{10}	—	March 24, 2006	Kitt Peak	Spacewatch	V	550 m	MPC · JPL
412110	2013 GY_{11}	—	October 6, 2004	Kitt Peak	Spacewatch	·	830 m	MPC · JPL
412111	2013 GF_{15}	—	May 3, 2006	Mount Lemmon	Mount Lemmon Survey	MAS	810 m	MPC · JPL
412112	2013 GD_{16}	—	April 8, 2006	Kitt Peak	Spacewatch	NYS	990 m	MPC · JPL
412113	2013 GC_{18}	—	October 30, 2010	Mount Lemmon	Mount Lemmon Survey	·	2.7 km	MPC · JPL
412114	2013 GL_{19}	—	February 9, 2002	Kitt Peak	Spacewatch	·	1.0 km	MPC · JPL
412115	2013 GF_{20}	—	February 10, 2008	Mount Lemmon	Mount Lemmon Survey	·	1.6 km	MPC · JPL
412116	2013 GK_{20}	—	February 9, 2005	Mount Lemmon	Mount Lemmon Survey	·	1.0 km	MPC · JPL
412117	2013 GB_{21}	—	April 2, 2006	Kitt Peak	Spacewatch	·	990 m	MPC · JPL
412118	2013 GS_{25}	—	December 16, 2006	Kitt Peak	Spacewatch	EUN	1.4 km	MPC · JPL
412119	2013 GU_{25}	—	May 20, 2010	WISE	WISE	PHO	3.4 km	MPC · JPL
412120	2013 GW_{25}	—	April 17, 2009	Mount Lemmon	Mount Lemmon Survey	EUN	1.7 km	MPC · JPL
412121	2013 GO_{30}	—	April 8, 2002	Kitt Peak	Spacewatch	·	1.2 km	MPC · JPL
412122	2013 GQ_{30}	—	March 31, 2013	Mount Lemmon	Mount Lemmon Survey	·	2.0 km	MPC · JPL
412123	2013 GO_{35}	—	March 29, 2000	Kitt Peak	Spacewatch	·	550 m	MPC · JPL
412124	2013 GF_{37}	—	August 13, 2010	Siding Spring	SSS	·	1.8 km	MPC · JPL
412125	2013 GU_{39}	—	January 2, 2009	Kitt Peak	Spacewatch	·	1.2 km	MPC · JPL
412126	2013 GA_{42}	—	April 30, 2006	Catalina	CSS	·	1.1 km	MPC · JPL
412127	2013 GQ_{42}	—	March 21, 2009	Kitt Peak	Spacewatch	·	1.2 km	MPC · JPL
412128	2013 GY_{42}	—	September 24, 1995	Kitt Peak	Spacewatch	·	1.6 km	MPC · JPL
412129	2013 GS_{45}	—	April 2, 2005	Kitt Peak	Spacewatch	H	580 m	MPC · JPL
412130	2013 GY_{45}	—	December 2, 2004	Socorro	LINEAR	(2076)	1.1 km	MPC · JPL
412131	2013 GS_{46}	—	May 7, 2006	Mount Lemmon	Mount Lemmon Survey	MAS	770 m	MPC · JPL
412132	2013 GD_{47}	—	May 13, 2009	Kitt Peak	Spacewatch	·	1.2 km	MPC · JPL
412133	2013 GP_{49}	—	November 18, 2011	Mount Lemmon	Mount Lemmon Survey	·	690 m	MPC · JPL
412134	2013 GV_{49}	—	March 16, 2002	Socorro	LINEAR	·	1.0 km	MPC · JPL
412135	2013 GW_{50}	—	October 21, 2003	Kitt Peak	Spacewatch	·	1.3 km	MPC · JPL
412136	2013 GE_{51}	—	September 10, 2007	Kitt Peak	Spacewatch	V	830 m	MPC · JPL
412137	2013 GX_{51}	—	April 26, 2009	Siding Spring	SSS	·	2.6 km	MPC · JPL
412138	2013 GG_{52}	—	September 25, 2006	Catalina	CSS	PHO	1.0 km	MPC · JPL
412139	2013 GB_{53}	—	December 29, 2011	Mount Lemmon	Mount Lemmon Survey	·	1.6 km	MPC · JPL
412140	2013 GO_{53}	—	February 16, 2001	Kitt Peak	Spacewatch	·	1.4 km	MPC · JPL
412141	2013 GH_{55}	—	September 26, 2006	Mount Lemmon	Mount Lemmon Survey	·	1.1 km	MPC · JPL
412142	2013 GD_{58}	—	September 24, 2000	Socorro	LINEAR	H	600 m	MPC · JPL
412143	2013 GN_{60}	—	October 3, 2006	Mount Lemmon	Mount Lemmon Survey	·	1.2 km	MPC · JPL
412144	2013 GF_{63}	—	January 16, 2008	Kitt Peak	Spacewatch	·	2.1 km	MPC · JPL
412145	2013 GV_{63}	—	December 13, 1999	Kitt Peak	Spacewatch	·	1.4 km	MPC · JPL
412146	2013 GA_{66}	—	May 7, 2008	Mount Lemmon	Mount Lemmon Survey	·	2.0 km	MPC · JPL
412147	2013 GX_{67}	—	December 5, 2007	Kitt Peak	Spacewatch	·	1.6 km	MPC · JPL
412148	2013 GH_{70}	—	March 12, 2007	Kitt Peak	Spacewatch	·	3.2 km	MPC · JPL
412149	2013 GE_{71}	—	December 19, 2004	Mount Lemmon	Mount Lemmon Survey	·	1.1 km	MPC · JPL
412150	2013 GF_{71}	—	April 12, 2002	Socorro	LINEAR	ERI	1.4 km	MPC · JPL
412151	2013 GK_{71}	—	February 7, 2008	Catalina	CSS	·	1.7 km	MPC · JPL
412152	2013 GK_{72}	—	September 27, 2006	Kitt Peak	Spacewatch	·	1.1 km	MPC · JPL
412153	2013 GV_{72}	—	May 13, 2005	Kitt Peak	Spacewatch	·	1.2 km	MPC · JPL
412154	2013 GG_{73}	—	March 23, 2006	Catalina	CSS	·	1.1 km	MPC · JPL
412155	2013 GU_{74}	—	September 20, 2003	Kitt Peak	Spacewatch	·	2.8 km	MPC · JPL
412156	2013 GP_{79}	—	March 14, 1999	Kitt Peak	Spacewatch	·	850 m	MPC · JPL
412157	2013 GH_{80}	—	April 14, 2005	Kitt Peak	Spacewatch	H	600 m	MPC · JPL
412158	2013 GC_{81}	—	October 2, 2006	Kitt Peak	Spacewatch	·	1.3 km	MPC · JPL
412159	2013 GH_{82}	—	January 3, 2009	Mount Lemmon	Mount Lemmon Survey	·	750 m	MPC · JPL
412160	2013 GM_{82}	—	March 26, 2006	Anderson Mesa	LONEOS	·	720 m	MPC · JPL
412161	2013 GA_{83}	—	January 31, 2006	Mount Lemmon	Mount Lemmon Survey	NYS	1 km	MPC · JPL
412162	2013 GA_{84}	—	December 31, 2008	Kitt Peak	Spacewatch	·	850 m	MPC · JPL
412163	2013 GB_{84}	—	March 24, 2006	Mount Lemmon	Mount Lemmon Survey	·	730 m	MPC · JPL
412164	2013 GO_{85}	—	March 17, 2005	Mount Lemmon	Mount Lemmon Survey	·	1.0 km	MPC · JPL
412165	2013 GP_{85}	—	March 6, 2008	Mount Lemmon	Mount Lemmon Survey	DOR	2.1 km	MPC · JPL
412166	2013 GR_{87}	—	February 28, 2006	Catalina	CSS	·	900 m	MPC · JPL
412167	2013 GW_{87}	—	July 19, 2009	Siding Spring	SSS	·	2.2 km	MPC · JPL
412168	2013 GW_{89}	—	April 29, 2008	Mount Lemmon	Mount Lemmon Survey	·	2.4 km	MPC · JPL
412169	2013 GX_{89}	—	September 24, 1995	Kitt Peak	Spacewatch	·	2.8 km	MPC · JPL
412170	2013 GR_{91}	—	February 9, 2005	Kitt Peak	Spacewatch	·	1.4 km	MPC · JPL
412171	2013 GF_{92}	—	March 9, 1999	Kitt Peak	Spacewatch	·	2.1 km	MPC · JPL
412172	2013 GY_{92}	—	February 17, 2010	Catalina	CSS	H	620 m	MPC · JPL
412173	2013 GS_{93}	—	September 17, 2010	Mount Lemmon	Mount Lemmon Survey	·	1.8 km	MPC · JPL
412174	2013 GV_{93}	—	April 8, 2002	Kitt Peak	Spacewatch	·	1.3 km	MPC · JPL
412175	2013 GE_{94}	—	January 6, 2006	Mount Lemmon	Mount Lemmon Survey	·	630 m	MPC · JPL
412176	2013 GL_{94}	—	April 4, 2005	Catalina	CSS	H	580 m	MPC · JPL
412177	2013 GO_{94}	—	April 5, 2000	Kitt Peak	Spacewatch	·	1.3 km	MPC · JPL
412178	2013 GW_{94}	—	March 25, 2006	Kitt Peak	Spacewatch	·	870 m	MPC · JPL
412179	2013 GL_{95}	—	October 7, 2004	Kitt Peak	Spacewatch	·	730 m	MPC · JPL
412180	2013 GD_{96}	—	February 19, 2009	Kitt Peak	Spacewatch	·	1.6 km	MPC · JPL
412181	2013 GO_{96}	—	May 16, 2010	WISE	WISE	PHO	920 m	MPC · JPL
412182	2013 GZ_{96}	—	February 27, 2006	Kitt Peak	Spacewatch	·	1.4 km	MPC · JPL
412183	2013 GG_{97}	—	December 26, 2005	Mount Lemmon	Mount Lemmon Survey	·	690 m	MPC · JPL
412184	2013 GS_{97}	—	September 25, 2006	Kitt Peak	Spacewatch	·	1.4 km	MPC · JPL
412185	2013 GU_{97}	—	October 2, 2003	Kitt Peak	Spacewatch	H	560 m	MPC · JPL
412186	2013 GD_{98}	—	May 11, 2005	Mount Lemmon	Mount Lemmon Survey	H	540 m	MPC · JPL
412187	2013 GT_{99}	—	September 24, 2006	Kitt Peak	Spacewatch	·	1.2 km	MPC · JPL
412188	2013 GV_{99}	—	April 26, 2006	Catalina	CSS	V	900 m	MPC · JPL
412189	2013 GR_{100}	—	September 14, 2007	Catalina	CSS	·	890 m	MPC · JPL
412190	2013 GS_{100}	—	December 31, 2008	Mount Lemmon	Mount Lemmon Survey	·	1.3 km	MPC · JPL
412191	2013 GT_{100}	—	October 12, 2007	Mount Lemmon	Mount Lemmon Survey	·	1.5 km	MPC · JPL
412192	2013 GV_{100}	—	September 23, 2004	Kitt Peak	Spacewatch	·	840 m	MPC · JPL
412193	2013 GB_{101}	—	February 10, 2008	Kitt Peak	Spacewatch	·	1.9 km	MPC · JPL
412194	2013 GL_{101}	—	November 12, 2010	Kitt Peak	Spacewatch	EOS	2.5 km	MPC · JPL
412195	2013 GM_{101}	—	September 11, 2010	Catalina	CSS	·	1.5 km	MPC · JPL
412196	2013 GP_{101}	—	November 17, 2011	Kitt Peak	Spacewatch	V	750 m	MPC · JPL
412197	2013 GV_{101}	—	May 20, 2005	Mount Lemmon	Mount Lemmon Survey	·	1.1 km	MPC · JPL
412198	2013 GW_{101}	—	December 10, 2010	Kitt Peak	Spacewatch	·	3.8 km	MPC · JPL
412199	2013 GC_{102}	—	October 11, 2007	Kitt Peak	Spacewatch	V	750 m	MPC · JPL
412200	2013 GW_{103}	—	February 4, 2005	Kitt Peak	Spacewatch	·	990 m	MPC · JPL

== 412201–412300 ==
back to top

Designation			Discovery			Properties		Ref
Permanent	Provisional	Named after	Date	Site	Discoverer(s)	Category	Diam.	Ref
412201	2013 GQ_{104}	—	October 3, 2008	Mount Lemmon	Mount Lemmon Survey	·	710 m	MPC · JPL
412202	2013 GE_{105}	—	April 9, 2006	Mount Lemmon	Mount Lemmon Survey	·	1.0 km	MPC · JPL
412203	2013 GH_{106}	—	February 4, 2005	Mount Lemmon	Mount Lemmon Survey	NYS	1.1 km	MPC · JPL
412204	2013 GJ_{106}	—	April 29, 2000	Socorro	LINEAR	·	1.7 km	MPC · JPL
412205	2013 GU_{107}	—	May 26, 2009	Catalina	CSS	·	1.4 km	MPC · JPL
412206	2013 GV_{107}	—	April 5, 2000	Anderson Mesa	LONEOS	·	770 m	MPC · JPL
412207	2013 GP_{108}	—	April 27, 2009	Mount Lemmon	Mount Lemmon Survey	·	1.7 km	MPC · JPL
412208	2013 GJ_{110}	—	October 8, 2007	Mount Lemmon	Mount Lemmon Survey	·	1.3 km	MPC · JPL
412209	2013 GP_{110}	—	September 5, 2007	Mount Lemmon	Mount Lemmon Survey	·	1.3 km	MPC · JPL
412210	2013 GD_{111}	—	October 12, 2007	Kitt Peak	Spacewatch	·	1.3 km	MPC · JPL
412211	2013 GM_{112}	—	January 19, 2004	Kitt Peak	Spacewatch	·	1.4 km	MPC · JPL
412212	2013 GU_{112}	—	March 15, 2004	Kitt Peak	Spacewatch	·	1.5 km	MPC · JPL
412213	2013 GD_{113}	—	December 22, 2008	Mount Lemmon	Mount Lemmon Survey	·	1.1 km	MPC · JPL
412214	2013 GK_{113}	—	November 10, 2010	Mount Lemmon	Mount Lemmon Survey	·	2.0 km	MPC · JPL
412215	2013 GD_{114}	—	November 16, 2006	Kitt Peak	Spacewatch	·	1.8 km	MPC · JPL
412216	2013 GJ_{114}	—	October 24, 2003	Kitt Peak	Spacewatch	·	3.9 km	MPC · JPL
412217	2013 GL_{114}	—	September 10, 2010	Mount Lemmon	Mount Lemmon Survey	·	1.2 km	MPC · JPL
412218	2013 GM_{114}	—	February 2, 2005	Kitt Peak	Spacewatch	·	1.4 km	MPC · JPL
412219	2013 GP_{115}	—	May 18, 2010	WISE	WISE	SUL	2.1 km	MPC · JPL
412220	2013 GL_{116}	—	October 10, 2010	Mount Lemmon	Mount Lemmon Survey	EUN	1.2 km	MPC · JPL
412221	2013 GT_{121}	—	March 10, 2002	Cima Ekar	ADAS	MAS	580 m	MPC · JPL
412222	2013 GE_{125}	—	January 4, 2012	Mount Lemmon	Mount Lemmon Survey	·	2.6 km	MPC · JPL
412223	2013 GB_{128}	—	March 19, 2009	Mount Lemmon	Mount Lemmon Survey	NYS	1.2 km	MPC · JPL
412224	2013 GR_{134}	—	December 3, 2008	Kitt Peak	Spacewatch	·	590 m	MPC · JPL
412225	2013 GZ_{135}	—	October 2, 2006	Mount Lemmon	Mount Lemmon Survey	·	1.2 km	MPC · JPL
412226	2013 GB_{136}	—	November 9, 2007	Kitt Peak	Spacewatch	·	1.2 km	MPC · JPL
412227	2013 HC_{1}	—	December 11, 2001	Socorro	LINEAR	H	580 m	MPC · JPL
412228	2013 HH_{3}	—	February 29, 2000	Socorro	LINEAR	·	1.4 km	MPC · JPL
412229	2013 HY_{3}	—	April 7, 2006	Catalina	CSS	(2076)	1.1 km	MPC · JPL
412230	2013 HA_{5}	—	January 29, 2009	Mount Lemmon	Mount Lemmon Survey	·	1.2 km	MPC · JPL
412231	2013 HM_{9}	—	December 4, 2007	Kitt Peak	Spacewatch	·	1.4 km	MPC · JPL
412232	2013 HV_{12}	—	February 1, 2009	Kitt Peak	Spacewatch	·	1.4 km	MPC · JPL
412233	2013 HY_{12}	—	March 24, 2006	Catalina	CSS	PHO	1.1 km	MPC · JPL
412234	2013 HT_{13}	—	January 30, 2012	Mount Lemmon	Mount Lemmon Survey	·	2.2 km	MPC · JPL
412235	2013 HQ_{15}	—	April 2, 2006	Catalina	CSS	·	870 m	MPC · JPL
412236	2013 HA_{17}	—	January 1, 2012	Mount Lemmon	Mount Lemmon Survey	V	880 m	MPC · JPL
412237	2013 HO_{19}	—	March 1, 2009	Mount Lemmon	Mount Lemmon Survey	·	1.2 km	MPC · JPL
412238	2013 HZ_{19}	—	May 29, 2009	Catalina	CSS	·	1.9 km	MPC · JPL
412239	2013 HS_{20}	—	January 17, 2008	Mount Lemmon	Mount Lemmon Survey	·	2.1 km	MPC · JPL
412240	2013 HU_{21}	—	March 14, 2007	Mount Lemmon	Mount Lemmon Survey	HYG	2.2 km	MPC · JPL
412241	2013 HY_{23}	—	November 15, 2006	Catalina	CSS	·	2.6 km	MPC · JPL
412242	2013 HE_{24}	—	August 1, 2005	Siding Spring	SSS	·	2.1 km	MPC · JPL
412243	2013 HA_{27}	—	March 25, 2006	Kitt Peak	Spacewatch	·	810 m	MPC · JPL
412244	2013 HC_{27}	—	October 2, 2006	Kitt Peak	Spacewatch	·	1.3 km	MPC · JPL
412245	2013 HG_{27}	—	May 3, 2008	Mount Lemmon	Mount Lemmon Survey	·	1.6 km	MPC · JPL
412246	2013 HF_{28}	—	November 22, 2006	Mount Lemmon	Mount Lemmon Survey	ADE	2.1 km	MPC · JPL
412247	2013 HL_{31}	—	December 30, 2007	Kitt Peak	Spacewatch	·	1.4 km	MPC · JPL
412248	2013 HT_{31}	—	October 1, 2003	Kitt Peak	Spacewatch	V	690 m	MPC · JPL
412249	2013 HF_{33}	—	October 21, 2011	Kitt Peak	Spacewatch	V	530 m	MPC · JPL
412250	2013 HF_{35}	—	October 8, 2010	Kitt Peak	Spacewatch	·	1.2 km	MPC · JPL
412251	2013 HP_{41}	—	October 13, 2010	Kitt Peak	Spacewatch	EUN	1.1 km	MPC · JPL
412252	2013 HJ_{46}	—	January 28, 2006	Mount Lemmon	Mount Lemmon Survey	·	660 m	MPC · JPL
412253	2013 HX_{51}	—	September 29, 2005	Mount Lemmon	Mount Lemmon Survey	·	1.7 km	MPC · JPL
412254	2013 HY_{57}	—	October 1, 2003	Kitt Peak	Spacewatch	·	1.0 km	MPC · JPL
412255	2013 HZ_{58}	—	February 28, 2008	Kitt Peak	Spacewatch	·	2.5 km	MPC · JPL
412256	2013 HK_{82}	—	October 13, 2001	Kitt Peak	Spacewatch	·	710 m	MPC · JPL
412257	2013 HZ_{84}	—	April 29, 2009	Mount Lemmon	Mount Lemmon Survey	·	1.1 km	MPC · JPL
412258	2013 HC_{103}	—	November 15, 2006	Kitt Peak	Spacewatch	·	1.1 km	MPC · JPL
412259	2013 HF_{103}	—	September 26, 2005	Kitt Peak	Spacewatch	GEF	1.1 km	MPC · JPL
412260	2013 HK_{103}	—	October 24, 1995	Kitt Peak	Spacewatch	·	620 m	MPC · JPL
412261	2013 HB_{107}	—	April 27, 2009	Mount Lemmon	Mount Lemmon Survey	(5)	840 m	MPC · JPL
412262	2013 HY_{107}	—	October 1, 2003	Kitt Peak	Spacewatch	MAS	580 m	MPC · JPL
412263	2013 HA_{110}	—	September 29, 2003	Kitt Peak	Spacewatch	MAS	760 m	MPC · JPL
412264	2013 HL_{112}	—	September 11, 2007	Kitt Peak	Spacewatch	·	910 m	MPC · JPL
412265	2013 HY_{113}	—	April 8, 2002	Kitt Peak	Spacewatch	·	1.3 km	MPC · JPL
412266	2013 HT_{119}	—	September 26, 2006	Kitt Peak	Spacewatch	·	1.2 km	MPC · JPL
412267	2013 HV_{128}	—	September 22, 2003	Kitt Peak	Spacewatch	·	1.0 km	MPC · JPL
412268	2013 HG_{133}	—	October 22, 2005	Kitt Peak	Spacewatch	·	1.4 km	MPC · JPL
412269	2013 JN_{1}	—	October 29, 2010	Mount Lemmon	Mount Lemmon Survey	·	1.3 km	MPC · JPL
412270	2013 JL_{2}	—	September 29, 2005	Mount Lemmon	Mount Lemmon Survey	·	1.6 km	MPC · JPL
412271	2013 JQ_{3}	—	November 30, 2008	Kitt Peak	Spacewatch	(2076)	830 m	MPC · JPL
412272	2013 JU_{3}	—	March 13, 2008	Catalina	CSS	·	2.0 km	MPC · JPL
412273	2013 JY_{4}	—	March 3, 2006	Mount Lemmon	Mount Lemmon Survey	·	750 m	MPC · JPL
412274	2013 JT_{5}	—	October 22, 2009	Mount Lemmon	Mount Lemmon Survey	·	2.2 km	MPC · JPL
412275	2013 JF_{6}	—	May 9, 2004	Kitt Peak	Spacewatch	·	1.6 km	MPC · JPL
412276	2013 JK_{6}	—	January 4, 2012	Mount Lemmon	Mount Lemmon Survey	BRA	1.5 km	MPC · JPL
412277	2013 JL_{6}	—	May 13, 2004	Kitt Peak	Spacewatch	AEO	1.1 km	MPC · JPL
412278	2013 JS_{8}	—	October 19, 2006	Kitt Peak	Spacewatch	RAF	850 m	MPC · JPL
412279	2013 JN_{10}	—	September 30, 2006	Mount Lemmon	Mount Lemmon Survey	·	1.5 km	MPC · JPL
412280	2013 JL_{11}	—	March 29, 2009	Kitt Peak	Spacewatch	V	640 m	MPC · JPL
412281	2013 JP_{11}	—	April 7, 2005	Mount Lemmon	Mount Lemmon Survey	·	990 m	MPC · JPL
412282	2013 JH_{13}	—	May 24, 2006	Mount Lemmon	Mount Lemmon Survey	·	660 m	MPC · JPL
412283	2013 JF_{14}	—	January 29, 2012	Kitt Peak	Spacewatch	·	1.6 km	MPC · JPL
412284	2013 JW_{15}	—	November 13, 2007	Mount Lemmon	Mount Lemmon Survey	V	790 m	MPC · JPL
412285	2013 JT_{18}	—	March 14, 2007	Mount Lemmon	Mount Lemmon Survey	·	2.6 km	MPC · JPL
412286	2013 JZ_{20}	—	November 9, 2007	Mount Lemmon	Mount Lemmon Survey	·	1.3 km	MPC · JPL
412287	2013 JN_{21}	—	February 11, 2008	Kitt Peak	Spacewatch	·	2.1 km	MPC · JPL
412288	2013 JW_{22}	—	February 28, 2006	Catalina	CSS	·	900 m	MPC · JPL
412289	2013 JC_{24}	—	April 28, 2000	Kitt Peak	Spacewatch	·	1.6 km	MPC · JPL
412290	2013 JD_{28}	—	October 2, 2006	Mount Lemmon	Mount Lemmon Survey	·	1.3 km	MPC · JPL
412291	2013 JD_{30}	—	April 7, 2013	Kitt Peak	Spacewatch	·	1.9 km	MPC · JPL
412292	2013 JR_{35}	—	May 16, 2004	Siding Spring	SSS	·	1.7 km	MPC · JPL
412293	2013 JW_{36}	—	December 26, 2006	Kitt Peak	Spacewatch	·	2.9 km	MPC · JPL
412294	2013 JP_{39}	—	November 2, 1999	Kitt Peak	Spacewatch	·	1.1 km	MPC · JPL
412295	2013 JV_{39}	—	May 6, 2002	Kitt Peak	Spacewatch	·	2.5 km	MPC · JPL
412296	2013 JS_{40}	—	December 15, 2006	Kitt Peak	Spacewatch	·	2.0 km	MPC · JPL
412297	2013 JY_{42}	—	February 22, 2006	Catalina	CSS	·	830 m	MPC · JPL
412298	2013 JC_{43}	—	November 2, 2007	Mount Lemmon	Mount Lemmon Survey	·	1.2 km	MPC · JPL
412299	2013 JT_{44}	—	March 23, 2006	Kitt Peak	Spacewatch	·	870 m	MPC · JPL
412300	2013 JJ_{46}	—	February 25, 2012	Mount Lemmon	Mount Lemmon Survey	·	1.2 km	MPC · JPL

== 412301–412400 ==
back to top

Designation			Discovery			Properties		Ref
Permanent	Provisional	Named after	Date	Site	Discoverer(s)	Category	Diam.	Ref
412301	2013 JE_{47}	—	February 22, 2004	Kitt Peak	Spacewatch	·	1.4 km	MPC · JPL
412302	2013 JL_{48}	—	August 31, 2009	Siding Spring	SSS	·	2.0 km	MPC · JPL
412303	2013 JX_{48}	—	July 18, 2006	Siding Spring	SSS	·	1.7 km	MPC · JPL
412304	2013 JN_{49}	—	April 25, 2006	Mount Lemmon	Mount Lemmon Survey	·	880 m	MPC · JPL
412305	2013 JU_{49}	—	March 10, 2008	Mount Lemmon	Mount Lemmon Survey	·	1.9 km	MPC · JPL
412306	2013 JB_{51}	—	May 14, 2008	Mount Lemmon	Mount Lemmon Survey	·	1.5 km	MPC · JPL
412307	2013 JX_{52}	—	September 20, 2001	Socorro	LINEAR	·	890 m	MPC · JPL
412308	2013 JV_{55}	—	May 22, 2003	Kitt Peak	Spacewatch	·	2.1 km	MPC · JPL
412309	2013 JK_{57}	—	December 3, 2010	Mount Lemmon	Mount Lemmon Survey	·	1.5 km	MPC · JPL
412310	2013 JF_{58}	—	April 12, 2002	Socorro	LINEAR	EOS	2.0 km	MPC · JPL
412311	2013 JR_{58}	—	March 17, 2009	Kitt Peak	Spacewatch	·	1.5 km	MPC · JPL
412312	2013 JJ_{61}	—	March 16, 2009	Kitt Peak	Spacewatch	·	1.1 km	MPC · JPL
412313	2013 JT_{61}	—	September 16, 2009	Catalina	CSS	EOS	2.8 km	MPC · JPL
412314	2013 JW_{61}	—	April 2, 2009	Mount Lemmon	Mount Lemmon Survey	V	750 m	MPC · JPL
412315	2013 JD_{62}	—	November 2, 2010	Mount Lemmon	Mount Lemmon Survey	·	2.1 km	MPC · JPL
412316	2013 JG_{62}	—	November 20, 2003	Kitt Peak	Spacewatch	·	1.4 km	MPC · JPL
412317	2013 JK_{62}	—	December 25, 2005	Kitt Peak	Spacewatch	·	3.0 km	MPC · JPL
412318	2013 JO_{62}	—	May 16, 2009	Mount Lemmon	Mount Lemmon Survey	·	1.1 km	MPC · JPL
412319	2013 JT_{63}	—	May 28, 2010	WISE	WISE	·	980 m	MPC · JPL
412320	2013 KE	—	December 25, 2005	Kitt Peak	Spacewatch	·	990 m	MPC · JPL
412321	2013 KF_{2}	—	January 23, 2006	Kitt Peak	Spacewatch	·	770 m	MPC · JPL
412322	2013 KK_{4}	—	November 24, 2008	Mount Lemmon	Mount Lemmon Survey	·	690 m	MPC · JPL
412323	2013 KN_{5}	—	October 20, 2006	Kitt Peak	Spacewatch	·	1.8 km	MPC · JPL
412324	2013 KD_{6}	—	October 2, 2006	Mount Lemmon	Mount Lemmon Survey	·	1.3 km	MPC · JPL
412325	2013 KE_{6}	—	December 4, 2005	Kitt Peak	Spacewatch	·	2.1 km	MPC · JPL
412326	2013 KT_{8}	—	September 11, 2001	Kitt Peak	Spacewatch	MIS	2.7 km	MPC · JPL
412327	2013 KO_{11}	—	September 14, 2009	Kitt Peak	Spacewatch	·	1.5 km	MPC · JPL
412328	2013 KH_{13}	—	September 30, 2006	Mount Lemmon	Mount Lemmon Survey	·	1.7 km	MPC · JPL
412329	2013 KT_{13}	—	April 3, 2008	Kitt Peak	Spacewatch	BRA	1.4 km	MPC · JPL
412330	2013 KX_{13}	—	June 1, 2009	Catalina	CSS	EUN	1.7 km	MPC · JPL
412331	2013 KM_{14}	—	October 3, 2006	Mount Lemmon	Mount Lemmon Survey	·	1.1 km	MPC · JPL
412332	2013 KR_{17}	—	March 22, 2004	Socorro	LINEAR	EUN	1.4 km	MPC · JPL
412333	2013 KE_{18}	—	November 23, 1997	Kitt Peak	Spacewatch	ADE	2.5 km	MPC · JPL
412334	2013 KF_{18}	—	August 10, 2010	Kitt Peak	Spacewatch	EUN	1.7 km	MPC · JPL
412335	2013 KH_{18}	—	October 3, 2006	Mount Lemmon	Mount Lemmon Survey	·	1.2 km	MPC · JPL
412336	2013 LH	—	March 10, 2007	Mount Lemmon	Mount Lemmon Survey	THM	2.0 km	MPC · JPL
412337	2013 LS_{1}	—	November 17, 2006	Mount Lemmon	Mount Lemmon Survey	EUN	1.7 km	MPC · JPL
412338	2013 LQ_{2}	—	October 19, 2003	Kitt Peak	Spacewatch	TIR	2.4 km	MPC · JPL
412339	2013 LP_{3}	—	October 13, 2006	Kitt Peak	Spacewatch	·	1.4 km	MPC · JPL
412340	2013 LV_{3}	—	February 22, 2001	Kitt Peak	Spacewatch	·	1.3 km	MPC · JPL
412341	2013 LX_{3}	—	October 8, 2005	Kitt Peak	Spacewatch	MRX	950 m	MPC · JPL
412342	2013 LB_{5}	—	October 23, 2006	Mount Lemmon	Mount Lemmon Survey	·	1.4 km	MPC · JPL
412343	2013 LL_{5}	—	November 10, 2006	Kitt Peak	Spacewatch	·	3.0 km	MPC · JPL
412344	2013 LZ_{7}	—	June 3, 2009	Mount Lemmon	Mount Lemmon Survey	·	3.5 km	MPC · JPL
412345	2013 LL_{8}	—	October 23, 2009	Kitt Peak	Spacewatch	·	2.0 km	MPC · JPL
412346	2013 LN_{8}	—	December 15, 2007	Kitt Peak	Spacewatch	·	1.4 km	MPC · JPL
412347	2013 LR_{8}	—	September 25, 2005	Catalina	CSS	EUN	1.4 km	MPC · JPL
412348	2013 LV_{9}	—	October 17, 2009	Mount Lemmon	Mount Lemmon Survey	HYG	2.5 km	MPC · JPL
412349	2013 LD_{10}	—	November 23, 2006	Kitt Peak	Spacewatch	ADE	2.2 km	MPC · JPL
412350	2013 LF_{11}	—	October 8, 2004	Kitt Peak	Spacewatch	EOS	2.3 km	MPC · JPL
412351	2013 LO_{11}	—	March 18, 2007	Kitt Peak	Spacewatch	·	2.7 km	MPC · JPL
412352	2013 LH_{14}	—	March 31, 2008	Kitt Peak	Spacewatch	·	1.8 km	MPC · JPL
412353	2013 LF_{15}	—	October 19, 2010	Mount Lemmon	Mount Lemmon Survey	·	1.6 km	MPC · JPL
412354	2013 LP_{15}	—	October 9, 2007	Mount Lemmon	Mount Lemmon Survey	·	1.1 km	MPC · JPL
412355	2013 LT_{15}	—	October 5, 2003	Kitt Peak	Spacewatch	·	2.4 km	MPC · JPL
412356	2013 LV_{15}	—	May 12, 2013	Mount Lemmon	Mount Lemmon Survey	(1118)	3.8 km	MPC · JPL
412357	2013 LV_{19}	—	November 8, 2009	Mount Lemmon	Mount Lemmon Survey	·	2.2 km	MPC · JPL
412358	2013 LF_{20}	—	April 21, 2004	Kitt Peak	Spacewatch	·	2.3 km	MPC · JPL
412359	2013 LN_{20}	—	April 27, 2000	Socorro	LINEAR	·	830 m	MPC · JPL
412360	2013 LZ_{20}	—	October 20, 2006	Mount Lemmon	Mount Lemmon Survey	·	1.4 km	MPC · JPL
412361	2013 LH_{21}	—	November 10, 2009	Kitt Peak	Spacewatch	·	3.2 km	MPC · JPL
412362	2013 LT_{23}	—	September 25, 2005	Kitt Peak	Spacewatch	·	2.0 km	MPC · JPL
412363	2013 LH_{26}	—	April 4, 2008	Kitt Peak	Spacewatch	·	1.9 km	MPC · JPL
412364	2013 LO_{26}	—	September 7, 2004	Kitt Peak	Spacewatch	·	1.5 km	MPC · JPL
412365	2013 LQ_{29}	—	September 30, 2010	Mount Lemmon	Mount Lemmon Survey	·	1.3 km	MPC · JPL
412366	2013 MZ_{1}	—	May 15, 1996	Kitt Peak	Spacewatch	·	1.4 km	MPC · JPL
412367	2013 MF_{6}	—	September 27, 2006	Mount Lemmon	Mount Lemmon Survey	·	1.2 km	MPC · JPL
412368	2013 MZ_{10}	—	December 14, 2004	Kitt Peak	Spacewatch	EOS	2.1 km	MPC · JPL
412369	2013 MK_{11}	—	June 13, 2007	Kitt Peak	Spacewatch	·	3.0 km	MPC · JPL
412370	2013 NY_{6}	—	December 15, 2001	Socorro	LINEAR	·	2.5 km	MPC · JPL
412371	2013 NC_{13}	—	August 20, 2008	Kitt Peak	Spacewatch	EOS	2.0 km	MPC · JPL
412372	2013 NO_{19}	—	April 1, 2012	Mount Lemmon	Mount Lemmon Survey	·	2.8 km	MPC · JPL
412373	2013 ND_{21}	—	December 15, 2009	Mount Lemmon	Mount Lemmon Survey	·	4.5 km	MPC · JPL
412374	2013 NY_{21}	—	October 23, 2009	Mount Lemmon	Mount Lemmon Survey	·	1.7 km	MPC · JPL
412375	2013 OO	—	September 16, 2009	Kitt Peak	Spacewatch	·	2.0 km	MPC · JPL
412376	2013 OP_{10}	—	October 3, 1997	Caussols	ODAS	·	3.3 km	MPC · JPL
412377	2013 OD_{11}	—	September 28, 2008	Catalina	CSS	·	3.3 km	MPC · JPL
412378	2013 PA_{26}	—	December 22, 2005	Catalina	CSS	·	2.6 km	MPC · JPL
412379	2013 PL_{33}	—	October 27, 2008	Catalina	CSS	·	5.7 km	MPC · JPL
412380	2013 PD_{43}	—	July 21, 2006	Mount Lemmon	Mount Lemmon Survey	3:2	6.7 km	MPC · JPL
412381	2013 PN_{58}	—	May 26, 2007	Mount Lemmon	Mount Lemmon Survey	EMA	3.0 km	MPC · JPL
412382	2013 PJ_{62}	—	November 3, 2010	Mount Lemmon	Mount Lemmon Survey	·	3.3 km	MPC · JPL
412383	2013 PB_{69}	—	October 26, 2008	Mount Lemmon	Mount Lemmon Survey	·	3.0 km	MPC · JPL
412384	2013 QK_{22}	—	January 28, 2011	Kitt Peak	Spacewatch	·	2.3 km	MPC · JPL
412385	2013 QE_{47}	—	September 23, 2008	Mount Lemmon	Mount Lemmon Survey	EOS	1.8 km	MPC · JPL
412386	2013 QK_{56}	—	February 28, 2008	Kitt Peak	Spacewatch	L5	10 km	MPC · JPL
412387	2013 QB_{59}	—	December 27, 2005	Kitt Peak	Spacewatch	·	2.3 km	MPC · JPL
412388	2013 QR_{76}	—	January 13, 2005	Kitt Peak	Spacewatch	·	3.7 km	MPC · JPL
412389	2013 QG_{82}	—	December 13, 2010	Mount Lemmon	Mount Lemmon Survey	EOS	2.3 km	MPC · JPL
412390	2013 RG_{57}	—	August 31, 2005	Kitt Peak	Spacewatch	3:2	5.3 km	MPC · JPL
412391	2013 RM_{78}	—	May 4, 2006	Siding Spring	SSS	·	3.9 km	MPC · JPL
412392	2013 RV_{85}	—	February 22, 2006	Kitt Peak	Spacewatch	·	2.8 km	MPC · JPL
412393	2013 SS_{58}	—	January 15, 2004	Kitt Peak	Spacewatch	EOS	4.2 km	MPC · JPL
412394	2013 TZ_{46}	—	April 29, 2008	Mount Lemmon	Mount Lemmon Survey	L5	8.6 km	MPC · JPL
412395	2013 TX_{127}	—	March 8, 2008	Kitt Peak	Spacewatch	L5	10 km	MPC · JPL
412396	2013 TO_{155}	—	March 6, 2006	Kitt Peak	Spacewatch	EOS	1.7 km	MPC · JPL
412397	2014 AJ_{42}	—	December 16, 1999	Kitt Peak	Spacewatch	·	2.4 km	MPC · JPL
412398	2014 BG_{23}	—	September 19, 2003	Kitt Peak	Spacewatch	·	2.1 km	MPC · JPL
412399	2014 BL_{29}	—	November 24, 2009	Mount Lemmon	Mount Lemmon Survey	EUN	2.2 km	MPC · JPL
412400	2014 BO_{37}	—	February 2, 2005	Catalina	CSS	·	2.9 km	MPC · JPL

== 412401–412500 ==
back to top

Designation			Discovery			Properties		Ref
Permanent	Provisional	Named after	Date	Site	Discoverer(s)	Category	Diam.	Ref
412401	2014 BX_{37}	—	September 13, 2007	Catalina	CSS	H	590 m	MPC · JPL
412402	2014 BF_{39}	—	October 9, 2008	Mount Lemmon	Mount Lemmon Survey	·	1.2 km	MPC · JPL
412403	2014 BE_{47}	—	July 5, 2005	Mount Lemmon	Mount Lemmon Survey	·	730 m	MPC · JPL
412404	2014 BG_{57}	—	October 15, 2007	Mount Lemmon	Mount Lemmon Survey	·	2.2 km	MPC · JPL
412405	2014 BQ_{62}	—	January 26, 2006	Mount Lemmon	Mount Lemmon Survey	MAR	1.2 km	MPC · JPL
412406	2014 CU_{17}	—	March 13, 2003	Kitt Peak	Spacewatch	·	1.1 km	MPC · JPL
412407	2014 CY_{17}	—	February 17, 2007	Mount Lemmon	Mount Lemmon Survey	·	700 m	MPC · JPL
412408	2014 CD_{18}	—	July 12, 2005	Mount Lemmon	Mount Lemmon Survey	·	900 m	MPC · JPL
412409	2014 CN_{18}	—	March 8, 2005	Mount Lemmon	Mount Lemmon Survey	·	1.7 km	MPC · JPL
412410	2014 CV_{22}	—	February 19, 2010	Mount Lemmon	Mount Lemmon Survey	·	1.9 km	MPC · JPL
412411	2014 CW_{22}	—	March 8, 2005	Mount Lemmon	Mount Lemmon Survey	·	2.2 km	MPC · JPL
412412	2014 DT_{6}	—	September 29, 2005	Mount Lemmon	Mount Lemmon Survey	MAS	680 m	MPC · JPL
412413	2014 DE_{21}	—	September 20, 1995	Kitt Peak	Spacewatch	EOS	2.9 km	MPC · JPL
412414	2014 DB_{24}	—	September 7, 1999	Socorro	LINEAR	·	4.2 km	MPC · JPL
412415	2014 DH_{60}	—	September 23, 2008	Mount Lemmon	Mount Lemmon Survey	(5)	1.2 km	MPC · JPL
412416	2014 DU_{68}	—	February 7, 2008	Mount Lemmon	Mount Lemmon Survey	·	3.5 km	MPC · JPL
412417	2014 DV_{82}	—	November 3, 2005	Mount Lemmon	Mount Lemmon Survey	ERI	2.0 km	MPC · JPL
412418	2014 DF_{84}	—	January 28, 2007	Mount Lemmon	Mount Lemmon Survey	·	900 m	MPC · JPL
412419	2014 DZ_{94}	—	June 6, 2010	Kitt Peak	Spacewatch	BRA	1.6 km	MPC · JPL
412420	2014 DV_{97}	—	October 8, 2008	Kitt Peak	Spacewatch	·	1.1 km	MPC · JPL
412421	2014 DD_{118}	—	October 4, 2006	Mount Lemmon	Mount Lemmon Survey	·	3.1 km	MPC · JPL
412422	2014 DJ_{130}	—	November 2, 2008	Kitt Peak	Spacewatch	MAS	780 m	MPC · JPL
412423	2014 DU_{130}	—	November 30, 1995	Kitt Peak	Spacewatch	·	790 m	MPC · JPL
412424	2014 DK_{139}	—	April 30, 1997	Socorro	LINEAR	·	690 m	MPC · JPL
412425	2014 DF_{142}	—	September 27, 2006	Kitt Peak	Spacewatch	TIR	3.4 km	MPC · JPL
412426	2014 EV_{1}	—	November 8, 2007	Kitt Peak	Spacewatch	·	2.4 km	MPC · JPL
412427	2014 EA_{2}	—	April 9, 1997	Kitt Peak	Spacewatch	·	1.9 km	MPC · JPL
412428	2014 EN_{4}	—	August 23, 2008	Siding Spring	SSS	PHO	2.6 km	MPC · JPL
412429	2014 EQ_{4}	—	March 17, 2010	Kitt Peak	Spacewatch	·	1.2 km	MPC · JPL
412430	2014 EU_{11}	—	June 11, 2005	Kitt Peak	Spacewatch	DOR	2.6 km	MPC · JPL
412431	2014 EF_{17}	—	May 11, 2003	Kitt Peak	Spacewatch	·	1.2 km	MPC · JPL
412432	2014 EG_{31}	—	December 14, 2010	Mount Lemmon	Mount Lemmon Survey	L4 · ERY	8.4 km	MPC · JPL
412433	2014 EY_{37}	—	October 26, 2005	Kitt Peak	Spacewatch	V	780 m	MPC · JPL
412434	2014 EP_{47}	—	September 18, 1998	Kitt Peak	Spacewatch	·	2.5 km	MPC · JPL
412435	2014 EV_{47}	—	January 4, 2010	Kitt Peak	Spacewatch	·	1.1 km	MPC · JPL
412436	2014 EG_{50}	—	December 5, 2000	Socorro	LINEAR	MAR	1.9 km	MPC · JPL
412437	2014 FW_{21}	—	December 11, 2004	Kitt Peak	Spacewatch	·	1.3 km	MPC · JPL
412438	2014 FB_{25}	—	February 29, 2000	Socorro	LINEAR	·	2.5 km	MPC · JPL
412439	2014 FT_{34}	—	September 24, 2008	Mount Lemmon	Mount Lemmon Survey	·	1.8 km	MPC · JPL
412440	2014 FM_{35}	—	June 11, 2005	Kitt Peak	Spacewatch	·	1.1 km	MPC · JPL
412441	2014 FF_{37}	—	March 18, 2009	Kitt Peak	Spacewatch	·	1.8 km	MPC · JPL
412442	2014 FU_{40}	—	April 11, 2007	Catalina	CSS	·	790 m	MPC · JPL
412443	2014 FV_{46}	—	October 18, 2007	Kitt Peak	Spacewatch	(5)	1.2 km	MPC · JPL
412444	2014 FU_{49}	—	July 27, 1995	Kitt Peak	Spacewatch	·	1.5 km	MPC · JPL
412445	2014 FG_{56}	—	August 31, 2005	Kitt Peak	Spacewatch	·	4.2 km	MPC · JPL
412446	2014 FQ_{62}	—	April 11, 2003	Kitt Peak	Spacewatch	TIR	2.7 km	MPC · JPL
412447	2014 GO_{4}	—	April 20, 2009	Mount Lemmon	Mount Lemmon Survey	·	2.4 km	MPC · JPL
412448	2014 GY_{4}	—	April 10, 2010	Kitt Peak	Spacewatch	·	1.2 km	MPC · JPL
412449	2014 GH_{5}	—	September 30, 2005	Mount Lemmon	Mount Lemmon Survey	·	3.0 km	MPC · JPL
412450	2014 GS_{14}	—	February 27, 2003	Campo Imperatore	CINEOS	·	2.3 km	MPC · JPL
412451	2014 GG_{15}	—	September 10, 2007	Kitt Peak	Spacewatch	·	1.9 km	MPC · JPL
412452	2014 GU_{31}	—	May 11, 1996	Kitt Peak	Spacewatch	NYS	1.8 km	MPC · JPL
412453	2014 GR_{36}	—	October 7, 2007	Catalina	CSS	PAD	2.4 km	MPC · JPL
412454	2014 GV_{36}	—	January 15, 2004	Kitt Peak	Spacewatch	·	2.5 km	MPC · JPL
412455	2014 GF_{39}	—	April 16, 2005	Kitt Peak	Spacewatch	·	2.0 km	MPC · JPL
412456	2014 GO_{39}	—	April 30, 2003	Socorro	LINEAR	NYS	1.4 km	MPC · JPL
412457	2014 GN_{42}	—	September 4, 2007	Catalina	CSS	·	2.0 km	MPC · JPL
412458	2014 GU_{46}	—	April 5, 2003	Kitt Peak	Spacewatch	NYS	1.3 km	MPC · JPL
412459	2014 GE_{48}	—	December 17, 2001	Socorro	LINEAR	·	4.1 km	MPC · JPL
412460	2014 HC_{1}	—	May 19, 2010	Kitt Peak	Spacewatch	·	2.1 km	MPC · JPL
412461	2014 HG_{1}	—	April 14, 2010	Kitt Peak	Spacewatch	·	2.5 km	MPC · JPL
412462	2014 HD_{6}	—	March 15, 2007	Mount Lemmon	Mount Lemmon Survey	NYS	1 km	MPC · JPL
412463	2014 HG_{6}	—	September 11, 2004	Kitt Peak	Spacewatch	·	1.0 km	MPC · JPL
412464	2014 HH_{6}	—	December 1, 2003	Kitt Peak	Spacewatch	·	2.0 km	MPC · JPL
412465	2014 HR_{6}	—	August 26, 2011	Kitt Peak	Spacewatch	·	1.4 km	MPC · JPL
412466	2014 HX_{6}	—	April 15, 2005	Anderson Mesa	LONEOS	NEM	2.6 km	MPC · JPL
412467	2014 HU_{16}	—	August 20, 1995	Kitt Peak	Spacewatch	·	740 m	MPC · JPL
412468	2014 HR_{22}	—	April 13, 2005	Catalina	CSS	·	1.9 km	MPC · JPL
412469	2014 HE_{25}	—	April 7, 2005	Kitt Peak	Spacewatch	·	1.9 km	MPC · JPL
412470	2014 HR_{25}	—	April 20, 2010	Kitt Peak	Spacewatch	·	1.2 km	MPC · JPL
412471	2014 HN_{33}	—	November 10, 2005	Mount Lemmon	Mount Lemmon Survey	·	1.2 km	MPC · JPL
412472	2014 HE_{52}	—	October 20, 2006	Mount Lemmon	Mount Lemmon Survey	·	2.3 km	MPC · JPL
412473	2014 HC_{93}	—	March 15, 2007	Kitt Peak	Spacewatch	·	880 m	MPC · JPL
412474	2014 HN_{124}	—	March 1, 2011	Catalina	CSS	H	700 m	MPC · JPL
412475	2014 HL_{130}	—	March 24, 2006	Kitt Peak	Spacewatch	·	1.1 km	MPC · JPL
412476	2014 HC_{133}	—	November 9, 1999	Kitt Peak	Spacewatch	·	3.0 km	MPC · JPL
412477	2014 HR_{147}	—	September 6, 2008	Kitt Peak	Spacewatch	L4	10 km	MPC · JPL
412478	2014 HX_{157}	—	September 7, 2011	Kitt Peak	Spacewatch	·	1.3 km	MPC · JPL
412479	2014 HX_{180}	—	December 15, 2006	Kitt Peak	Spacewatch	·	5.4 km	MPC · JPL
412480	2014 HP_{194}	—	March 11, 2007	Kitt Peak	Spacewatch	·	920 m	MPC · JPL
412481	2014 HQ_{194}	—	April 30, 1997	Socorro	LINEAR	·	1.8 km	MPC · JPL
412482	2014 HU_{194}	—	March 10, 2008	Catalina	CSS	·	3.5 km	MPC · JPL
412483	2014 HK_{195}	—	December 30, 2007	Kitt Peak	Spacewatch	·	2.2 km	MPC · JPL
412484	2014 JP	—	December 19, 2004	Mount Lemmon	Mount Lemmon Survey	·	1.9 km	MPC · JPL
412485	2014 JW_{2}	—	January 13, 2005	Kitt Peak	Spacewatch	·	1.4 km	MPC · JPL
412486	2014 JL_{4}	—	February 9, 2008	Mount Lemmon	Mount Lemmon Survey	·	4.6 km	MPC · JPL
412487	2014 JB_{6}	—	March 15, 2007	Mount Lemmon	Mount Lemmon Survey	·	840 m	MPC · JPL
412488	2014 JE_{16}	—	March 9, 2007	Kitt Peak	Spacewatch	·	640 m	MPC · JPL
412489	2014 JV_{16}	—	March 6, 2008	Mount Lemmon	Mount Lemmon Survey	·	3.5 km	MPC · JPL
412490	2014 JZ_{18}	—	March 24, 2006	Mount Lemmon	Mount Lemmon Survey	·	1.3 km	MPC · JPL
412491	2014 JW_{19}	—	January 5, 2006	Kitt Peak	Spacewatch	·	1.2 km	MPC · JPL
412492	2014 JV_{20}	—	December 7, 2005	Kitt Peak	Spacewatch	·	930 m	MPC · JPL
412493	2014 JV_{26}	—	January 16, 2005	Kitt Peak	Spacewatch	·	1.4 km	MPC · JPL
412494	2014 JE_{33}	—	May 3, 2010	Kitt Peak	Spacewatch	·	1.2 km	MPC · JPL
412495	2014 JN_{60}	—	August 27, 2006	Kitt Peak	Spacewatch	·	1.7 km	MPC · JPL
412496	2014 JN_{70}	—	March 12, 2003	Kitt Peak	Spacewatch	·	1.2 km	MPC · JPL
412497	2014 JL_{77}	—	September 1, 2005	Kitt Peak	Spacewatch	·	3.4 km	MPC · JPL
412498	2014 KJ_{7}	—	September 22, 2008	Mount Lemmon	Mount Lemmon Survey	V	770 m	MPC · JPL
412499	2014 KC_{26}	—	November 27, 2006	Mount Lemmon	Mount Lemmon Survey	·	3.2 km	MPC · JPL
412500	2014 KR_{27}	—	September 18, 2003	Kitt Peak	Spacewatch	·	1.0 km	MPC · JPL

== 412501–412600 ==
back to top

Designation			Discovery			Properties		Ref
Permanent	Provisional	Named after	Date	Site	Discoverer(s)	Category	Diam.	Ref
412501	2014 KT_{27}	—	September 11, 2007	Kitt Peak	Spacewatch	·	2.2 km	MPC · JPL
412502	2014 KY_{36}	—	December 28, 2000	Kitt Peak	Spacewatch	·	1.4 km	MPC · JPL
412503	2014 KT_{58}	—	January 17, 2007	Kitt Peak	Spacewatch	EOS	2.3 km	MPC · JPL
412504	2014 KA_{84}	—	September 24, 2000	Socorro	LINEAR	·	1.6 km	MPC · JPL
412505	2014 KM_{85}	—	May 30, 2006	Siding Spring	SSS	·	2.8 km	MPC · JPL
412506	2014 KJ_{86}	—	July 28, 2009	Catalina	CSS	·	4.1 km	MPC · JPL
412507	2014 KV_{89}	—	May 2, 2003	Kitt Peak	Spacewatch	·	4.1 km	MPC · JPL
412508	2014 KN_{90}	—	May 20, 2010	WISE	WISE	ADE	2.9 km	MPC · JPL
412509	2014 LL_{9}	—	August 19, 2001	Socorro	LINEAR	H	580 m	MPC · JPL
412510	2014 LN_{11}	—	March 26, 2009	Mount Lemmon	Mount Lemmon Survey	·	1.6 km	MPC · JPL
412511	2014 LO_{15}	—	December 1, 2003	Kitt Peak	Spacewatch	·	1.5 km	MPC · JPL
412512	2014 LY_{26}	—	October 7, 2004	Anderson Mesa	LONEOS	·	2.4 km	MPC · JPL
412513	2014 MY_{2}	—	April 10, 2010	Kitt Peak	Spacewatch	SUL	2.6 km	MPC · JPL
412514	2014 MJ_{4}	—	November 19, 2007	Mount Lemmon	Mount Lemmon Survey	·	2.9 km	MPC · JPL
412515	2014 MM_{5}	—	December 10, 2004	Socorro	LINEAR	·	940 m	MPC · JPL
412516	2014 MM_{14}	—	September 4, 2008	Kitt Peak	Spacewatch	·	790 m	MPC · JPL
412517	2014 MS_{16}	—	December 19, 1995	Kitt Peak	Spacewatch	MAS	1.1 km	MPC · JPL
412518	2014 MD_{17}	—	April 8, 2003	Kitt Peak	Spacewatch	·	830 m	MPC · JPL
412519	2014 MN_{20}	—	February 28, 2009	Kitt Peak	Spacewatch	·	1.8 km	MPC · JPL
412520	2014 MW_{20}	—	December 25, 2005	Kitt Peak	Spacewatch	·	940 m	MPC · JPL
412521	2014 ML_{22}	—	September 15, 2004	Anderson Mesa	LONEOS	·	780 m	MPC · JPL
412522	2014 ME_{34}	—	September 24, 2008	Kitt Peak	Spacewatch	V	850 m	MPC · JPL
412523	2014 MO_{34}	—	May 27, 2000	Socorro	LINEAR	·	1.1 km	MPC · JPL
412524	2014 MY_{36}	—	October 23, 2003	Kitt Peak	Spacewatch	NYS	1.4 km	MPC · JPL
412525	2014 MH_{37}	—	May 25, 2010	WISE	WISE	·	1.0 km	MPC · JPL
412526	2014 MT_{37}	—	October 21, 2003	Kitt Peak	Spacewatch	·	1.5 km	MPC · JPL
412527	2014 MW_{37}	—	April 20, 2009	Mount Lemmon	Mount Lemmon Survey	·	1.1 km	MPC · JPL
412528	2014 MX_{37}	—	April 30, 2003	Kitt Peak	Spacewatch	·	1.1 km	MPC · JPL
412529	2014 MY_{37}	—	September 13, 2004	Kitt Peak	Spacewatch	KOR	1.6 km	MPC · JPL
412530	2014 MN_{38}	—	August 9, 2007	Kitt Peak	Spacewatch	·	850 m	MPC · JPL
412531	2014 MS_{39}	—	March 13, 2010	Mount Lemmon	Mount Lemmon Survey	·	1.9 km	MPC · JPL
412532	2014 MS_{42}	—	November 24, 1995	Kitt Peak	Spacewatch	V	790 m	MPC · JPL
412533	2014 MH_{43}	—	September 18, 2003	Kitt Peak	Spacewatch	·	3.7 km	MPC · JPL
412534	2014 MN_{43}	—	October 7, 2004	Kitt Peak	Spacewatch	·	720 m	MPC · JPL
412535	2014 MR_{43}	—	February 24, 2009	Catalina	CSS	·	1.6 km	MPC · JPL
412536 Farquharson	2014 MF_{46}	Farquharson	November 15, 2006	Mount Lemmon	Mount Lemmon Survey	·	1.8 km	MPC · JPL
412537	2014 MR_{49}	—	October 16, 2006	Kitt Peak	Spacewatch	·	1.7 km	MPC · JPL
412538	2014 MN_{51}	—	February 25, 2006	Mount Lemmon	Mount Lemmon Survey	LUT	5.0 km	MPC · JPL
412539	2014 MQ_{52}	—	October 25, 2008	Mount Lemmon	Mount Lemmon Survey	·	650 m	MPC · JPL
412540	2014 MM_{53}	—	February 23, 2007	Kitt Peak	Spacewatch	TIR	2.5 km	MPC · JPL
412541	2014 MV_{62}	—	December 2, 2005	Kitt Peak	Spacewatch	·	3.5 km	MPC · JPL
412542	2014 MY_{62}	—	February 7, 1995	Kitt Peak	Spacewatch	VER	3.0 km	MPC · JPL
412543	2014 MJ_{64}	—	October 21, 2006	Catalina	CSS	·	1.5 km	MPC · JPL
412544	2014 MK_{65}	—	September 15, 2009	Kitt Peak	Spacewatch	·	2.7 km	MPC · JPL
412545	2014 NW	—	September 11, 2004	Kitt Peak	Spacewatch	V	610 m	MPC · JPL
412546	2014 NP_{1}	—	August 23, 2007	Kitt Peak	Spacewatch	·	1.0 km	MPC · JPL
412547	2014 NW_{12}	—	November 19, 2008	Kitt Peak	Spacewatch	V	740 m	MPC · JPL
412548	2014 NF_{20}	—	April 24, 2001	Kitt Peak	Spacewatch	·	3.0 km	MPC · JPL
412549	2014 ND_{24}	—	October 4, 2004	Kitt Peak	Spacewatch	V	630 m	MPC · JPL
412550	2014 NL_{25}	—	April 21, 1998	Socorro	LINEAR	·	1.1 km	MPC · JPL
412551	2014 NG_{29}	—	January 9, 2006	Kitt Peak	Spacewatch	·	3.7 km	MPC · JPL
412552	2014 NT_{30}	—	March 31, 2009	Mount Lemmon	Mount Lemmon Survey	·	2.3 km	MPC · JPL
412553	2014 NP_{33}	—	September 13, 2007	Mount Lemmon	Mount Lemmon Survey	V	610 m	MPC · JPL
412554	2014 NZ_{37}	—	February 5, 2006	Mount Lemmon	Mount Lemmon Survey	(2076)	790 m	MPC · JPL
412555	2014 NA_{40}	—	May 18, 2004	Socorro	LINEAR	·	2.3 km	MPC · JPL
412556	2014 NC_{44}	—	January 13, 2010	WISE	WISE	LUT	6.0 km	MPC · JPL
412557	2014 NH_{44}	—	December 15, 2004	Kitt Peak	Spacewatch	·	3.7 km	MPC · JPL
412558	2014 NH_{45}	—	September 18, 2009	Catalina	CSS	ELF	5.3 km	MPC · JPL
412559	2014 NQ_{51}	—	December 21, 2008	Mount Lemmon	Mount Lemmon Survey	·	1.3 km	MPC · JPL
412560	2014 NP_{54}	—	November 4, 2004	Kitt Peak	Spacewatch	EOS	2.3 km	MPC · JPL
412561	2014 NS_{54}	—	November 7, 2008	Mount Lemmon	Mount Lemmon Survey	·	980 m	MPC · JPL
412562	2014 NH_{55}	—	November 5, 2007	Mount Lemmon	Mount Lemmon Survey	·	1.4 km	MPC · JPL
412563	2014 NH_{56}	—	January 18, 2008	Mount Lemmon	Mount Lemmon Survey	·	2.4 km	MPC · JPL
412564	2014 NX_{58}	—	January 11, 2008	Kitt Peak	Spacewatch	EUN	1.4 km	MPC · JPL
412565	2014 NY_{58}	—	January 7, 2006	Kitt Peak	Spacewatch	·	3.0 km	MPC · JPL
412566	2014 NE_{59}	—	April 22, 2007	Kitt Peak	Spacewatch	·	660 m	MPC · JPL
412567	2014 NM_{59}	—	August 22, 2003	Socorro	LINEAR	TIR	3.3 km	MPC · JPL
412568	2014 NU_{59}	—	October 10, 2007	Catalina	CSS	V	850 m	MPC · JPL
412569	2014 NX_{59}	—	January 31, 2009	Mount Lemmon	Mount Lemmon Survey	V	1.0 km	MPC · JPL
412570	2014 NQ_{60}	—	January 20, 2010	WISE	WISE	·	2.0 km	MPC · JPL
412571	2014 NJ_{62}	—	January 7, 2006	Mount Lemmon	Mount Lemmon Survey	·	3.2 km	MPC · JPL
412572	2014 OD_{2}	—	December 16, 2004	Kitt Peak	Spacewatch	·	830 m	MPC · JPL
412573	2014 OD_{3}	—	October 23, 2003	Anderson Mesa	LONEOS	·	1.7 km	MPC · JPL
412574	2014 OE_{3}	—	February 8, 2002	Kitt Peak	Spacewatch	·	1.0 km	MPC · JPL
412575	2014 OK_{6}	—	August 27, 2006	Kitt Peak	Spacewatch	·	2.7 km	MPC · JPL
412576	2014 OD_{12}	—	February 7, 2008	Mount Lemmon	Mount Lemmon Survey	AGN	1.0 km	MPC · JPL
412577	2014 OA_{15}	—	September 9, 2007	Anderson Mesa	LONEOS	V	640 m	MPC · JPL
412578	2014 OG_{20}	—	December 28, 2005	Kitt Peak	Spacewatch	·	2.6 km	MPC · JPL
412579	2014 OC_{21}	—	September 12, 2007	Mount Lemmon	Mount Lemmon Survey	MAS	590 m	MPC · JPL
412580	2014 OE_{29}	—	October 30, 2005	Kitt Peak	Spacewatch	·	1.8 km	MPC · JPL
412581	2014 OF_{36}	—	December 20, 2007	Kitt Peak	Spacewatch	·	1.7 km	MPC · JPL
412582	2014 ON_{38}	—	March 16, 2010	Mount Lemmon	Mount Lemmon Survey	·	770 m	MPC · JPL
412583	2014 OR_{39}	—	September 3, 2010	Mount Lemmon	Mount Lemmon Survey	·	1.1 km	MPC · JPL
412584	2014 OO_{42}	—	January 31, 2006	Kitt Peak	Spacewatch	·	940 m	MPC · JPL
412585	2014 OK_{46}	—	February 19, 2009	Mount Lemmon	Mount Lemmon Survey	·	1.1 km	MPC · JPL
412586	2014 OV_{46}	—	December 14, 2001	Socorro	LINEAR	·	2.2 km	MPC · JPL
412587	2014 OU_{55}	—	February 3, 2000	Kitt Peak	Spacewatch	·	1.6 km	MPC · JPL
412588	2014 OL_{57}	—	August 30, 2005	Kitt Peak	Spacewatch	·	1.7 km	MPC · JPL
412589	2014 OE_{60}	—	February 21, 2007	Mount Lemmon	Mount Lemmon Survey	·	3.0 km	MPC · JPL
412590	2014 OC_{64}	—	February 1, 2005	Kitt Peak	Spacewatch	·	2.0 km	MPC · JPL
412591	2014 OS_{64}	—	March 23, 2006	Kitt Peak	Spacewatch	NYS	1.1 km	MPC · JPL
412592	2014 OG_{65}	—	November 13, 2006	Kitt Peak	Spacewatch	PAD	1.8 km	MPC · JPL
412593	2014 OU_{65}	—	July 27, 2001	Anderson Mesa	LONEOS	·	650 m	MPC · JPL
412594	2014 OH_{67}	—	January 23, 2006	Kitt Peak	Spacewatch	EOS	2.3 km	MPC · JPL
412595	2014 OF_{68}	—	October 15, 2004	Mount Lemmon	Mount Lemmon Survey	·	3.9 km	MPC · JPL
412596	2014 OL_{68}	—	November 19, 2006	Kitt Peak	Spacewatch	·	2.1 km	MPC · JPL
412597	2014 OU_{69}	—	October 10, 2001	Kitt Peak	Spacewatch	·	650 m	MPC · JPL
412598	2014 OW_{70}	—	November 4, 2004	Kitt Peak	Spacewatch	·	590 m	MPC · JPL
412599	2014 OY_{70}	—	May 10, 2005	Kitt Peak	Spacewatch	·	2.1 km	MPC · JPL
412600	2014 ON_{71}	—	September 16, 2009	Kitt Peak	Spacewatch	·	3.0 km	MPC · JPL

== 412601–412700 ==
back to top

Designation			Discovery			Properties		Ref
Permanent	Provisional	Named after	Date	Site	Discoverer(s)	Category	Diam.	Ref
412601	2014 OX_{71}	—	October 9, 2004	Kitt Peak	Spacewatch	·	600 m	MPC · JPL
412602	2014 OL_{72}	—	May 4, 2005	Kitt Peak	Spacewatch	·	1.2 km	MPC · JPL
412603	2014 OW_{76}	—	March 3, 2006	Mount Lemmon	Mount Lemmon Survey	·	930 m	MPC · JPL
412604	2014 OT_{80}	—	May 21, 2005	Mount Lemmon	Mount Lemmon Survey	·	2.4 km	MPC · JPL
412605	2014 OK_{89}	—	December 1, 2003	Kitt Peak	Spacewatch	·	1.1 km	MPC · JPL
412606	2014 OG_{90}	—	January 7, 2006	Kitt Peak	Spacewatch	·	3.4 km	MPC · JPL
412607	2014 OA_{93}	—	June 29, 2005	Kitt Peak	Spacewatch	·	1.7 km	MPC · JPL
412608	2014 OS_{94}	—	July 24, 2010	WISE	WISE	·	1.7 km	MPC · JPL
412609	2014 OH_{95}	—	March 15, 2004	Kitt Peak	Spacewatch	·	1.5 km	MPC · JPL
412610	2014 OO_{95}	—	January 15, 2004	Kitt Peak	Spacewatch	·	1.3 km	MPC · JPL
412611	2014 OG_{96}	—	September 20, 2003	Kitt Peak	Spacewatch	·	1.3 km	MPC · JPL
412612	2014 OE_{99}	—	February 27, 2001	Kitt Peak	Spacewatch	·	2.6 km	MPC · JPL
412613	2014 OT_{99}	—	April 26, 2001	Kitt Peak	Spacewatch	·	1.2 km	MPC · JPL
412614	2014 OA_{100}	—	August 20, 2003	Campo Imperatore	CINEOS	TIR	3.1 km	MPC · JPL
412615	2014 OH_{100}	—	September 11, 2004	Kitt Peak	Spacewatch	·	1.9 km	MPC · JPL
412616	2014 OG_{101}	—	February 25, 2010	WISE	WISE	T_{j} (2.98) · EUP	4.3 km	MPC · JPL
412617	2014 OP_{101}	—	February 10, 2008	Kitt Peak	Spacewatch	(194)	1.7 km	MPC · JPL
412618	2014 OA_{102}	—	March 16, 2010	Mount Lemmon	Mount Lemmon Survey	·	750 m	MPC · JPL
412619	2014 OM_{103}	—	January 26, 2006	Kitt Peak	Spacewatch	·	830 m	MPC · JPL
412620	2014 OT_{103}	—	September 18, 2003	Kitt Peak	Spacewatch	·	1.5 km	MPC · JPL
412621	2014 OW_{103}	—	July 2, 2008	Kitt Peak	Spacewatch	·	4.5 km	MPC · JPL
412622	2014 OY_{103}	—	January 31, 2006	Kitt Peak	Spacewatch	·	2.7 km	MPC · JPL
412623	2014 OT_{109}	—	June 27, 2010	WISE	WISE	·	1.9 km	MPC · JPL
412624	2014 OX_{110}	—	March 14, 2007	Kitt Peak	Spacewatch	·	2.6 km	MPC · JPL
412625	2014 OS_{111}	—	April 5, 2003	Kitt Peak	Spacewatch	·	860 m	MPC · JPL
412626	2014 OZ_{119}	—	December 21, 2003	Kitt Peak	Spacewatch	·	1.6 km	MPC · JPL
412627	2014 OS_{130}	—	November 9, 1999	Kitt Peak	Spacewatch	MAS	810 m	MPC · JPL
412628	2014 OQ_{136}	—	March 11, 2008	Mount Lemmon	Mount Lemmon Survey	·	1.7 km	MPC · JPL
412629	2014 OO_{152}	—	February 11, 2004	Kitt Peak	Spacewatch	·	1.8 km	MPC · JPL
412630	2014 OY_{167}	—	December 19, 2007	Mount Lemmon	Mount Lemmon Survey	·	1.7 km	MPC · JPL
412631	2014 OG_{169}	—	November 14, 2006	Kitt Peak	Spacewatch	·	1.5 km	MPC · JPL
412632	2014 OO_{169}	—	January 16, 2004	Catalina	CSS	BRG	1.4 km	MPC · JPL
412633	2014 OW_{169}	—	December 25, 2010	Kitt Peak	Spacewatch	·	3.4 km	MPC · JPL
412634	2014 OU_{171}	—	July 29, 2010	WISE	WISE	·	1.9 km	MPC · JPL
412635	2014 OU_{174}	—	October 23, 2006	Catalina	CSS	·	2.9 km	MPC · JPL
412636	2014 OB_{175}	—	September 26, 2006	Kitt Peak	Spacewatch	·	1.3 km	MPC · JPL
412637	2014 OA_{180}	—	December 23, 2003	Socorro	LINEAR	·	1.3 km	MPC · JPL
412638	2014 OL_{180}	—	April 5, 2005	Mount Lemmon	Mount Lemmon Survey	·	1.8 km	MPC · JPL
412639	2014 OL_{181}	—	March 20, 2007	Mount Lemmon	Mount Lemmon Survey	·	2.4 km	MPC · JPL
412640	2014 OY_{184}	—	December 6, 2005	Kitt Peak	Spacewatch	·	2.3 km	MPC · JPL
412641	2014 OH_{185}	—	December 14, 2004	Catalina	CSS	·	830 m	MPC · JPL
412642	2014 OJ_{185}	—	January 19, 2005	Kitt Peak	Spacewatch	CYB	6.1 km	MPC · JPL
412643	2014 OH_{186}	—	April 14, 2007	Catalina	CSS	·	3.5 km	MPC · JPL
412644	2014 OY_{186}	—	April 21, 2009	Mount Lemmon	Mount Lemmon Survey	·	1.4 km	MPC · JPL
412645	2014 OV_{187}	—	February 1, 2006	Kitt Peak	Spacewatch	·	3.0 km	MPC · JPL
412646	2014 OC_{188}	—	September 19, 2003	Kitt Peak	Spacewatch	·	3.2 km	MPC · JPL
412647	2014 OL_{188}	—	December 15, 2004	Kitt Peak	Spacewatch	·	980 m	MPC · JPL
412648	2014 OC_{189}	—	March 12, 2007	Kitt Peak	Spacewatch	EOS	1.9 km	MPC · JPL
412649	2014 OE_{189}	—	September 28, 2003	Kitt Peak	Spacewatch	·	1.1 km	MPC · JPL
412650	2014 OQ_{189}	—	October 20, 1995	Kitt Peak	Spacewatch	MAS	850 m	MPC · JPL
412651	2014 OW_{190}	—	October 1, 2005	Kitt Peak	Spacewatch	·	2.1 km	MPC · JPL
412652	2014 OH_{191}	—	May 30, 2006	Mount Lemmon	Mount Lemmon Survey	·	1.3 km	MPC · JPL
412653	2014 OK_{191}	—	September 20, 2001	Socorro	LINEAR	·	3.5 km	MPC · JPL
412654	2014 OO_{192}	—	February 20, 2006	Kitt Peak	Spacewatch	·	2.9 km	MPC · JPL
412655	2014 OP_{192}	—	October 1, 2009	Mount Lemmon	Mount Lemmon Survey	·	4.1 km	MPC · JPL
412656	2014 OU_{192}	—	October 23, 2003	Kitt Peak	Spacewatch	NYS	1.4 km	MPC · JPL
412657	2014 OC_{193}	—	July 29, 2008	Kitt Peak	Spacewatch	·	3.0 km	MPC · JPL
412658	2014 OH_{193}	—	March 14, 2005	Mount Lemmon	Mount Lemmon Survey	·	1.7 km	MPC · JPL
412659	2014 OD_{194}	—	December 16, 2007	Kitt Peak	Spacewatch	MAS	680 m	MPC · JPL
412660	2014 OU_{194}	—	March 31, 2008	Mount Lemmon	Mount Lemmon Survey	·	1.7 km	MPC · JPL
412661	2014 OA_{195}	—	October 10, 2004	Kitt Peak	Spacewatch	·	900 m	MPC · JPL
412662	2014 OC_{195}	—	August 10, 2004	Socorro	LINEAR	·	600 m	MPC · JPL
412663	2014 OP_{195}	—	September 16, 2003	Kitt Peak	Spacewatch	MAS	670 m	MPC · JPL
412664	2014 OH_{196}	—	February 3, 2009	Mount Lemmon	Mount Lemmon Survey	·	1.5 km	MPC · JPL
412665	2014 OQ_{196}	—	August 16, 2009	Kitt Peak	Spacewatch	·	2.2 km	MPC · JPL
412666	2014 OT_{196}	—	September 4, 2000	Kitt Peak	Spacewatch	·	840 m	MPC · JPL
412667	2014 OY_{196}	—	March 8, 2005	Mount Lemmon	Mount Lemmon Survey	·	1.5 km	MPC · JPL
412668	2014 OK_{197}	—	February 13, 2010	WISE	WISE	EUP	5.5 km	MPC · JPL
412669	2014 OF_{198}	—	February 26, 1995	Kitt Peak	Spacewatch	·	2.3 km	MPC · JPL
412670	2014 OJ_{198}	—	February 6, 1997	Kitt Peak	Spacewatch	PHO	1.2 km	MPC · JPL
412671	2014 OM_{198}	—	October 17, 2003	Kitt Peak	Spacewatch	·	1.4 km	MPC · JPL
412672	2014 OU_{200}	—	December 24, 2005	Kitt Peak	Spacewatch	·	3.0 km	MPC · JPL
412673	2014 OG_{202}	—	December 15, 2006	Mount Lemmon	Mount Lemmon Survey	AGN	1.1 km	MPC · JPL
412674	2014 OW_{206}	—	October 1, 2003	Kitt Peak	Spacewatch	·	2.3 km	MPC · JPL
412675	2014 OB_{207}	—	September 24, 2009	Kitt Peak	Spacewatch	·	2.7 km	MPC · JPL
412676	2014 OW_{211}	—	September 11, 2007	Mount Lemmon	Mount Lemmon Survey	·	750 m	MPC · JPL
412677	2014 OM_{214}	—	July 7, 2003	Kitt Peak	Spacewatch	·	1.3 km	MPC · JPL
412678	2014 OX_{216}	—	January 8, 2000	Kitt Peak	Spacewatch	TIR	3.9 km	MPC · JPL
412679	2014 OO_{222}	—	November 2, 2010	Kitt Peak	Spacewatch	VER	3.4 km	MPC · JPL
412680	2014 OL_{226}	—	December 2, 2010	Mount Lemmon	Mount Lemmon Survey	EOS	1.8 km	MPC · JPL
412681	2014 OB_{227}	—	April 19, 2004	Kitt Peak	Spacewatch	·	1.9 km	MPC · JPL
412682	2014 OY_{230}	—	July 24, 1995	Kitt Peak	Spacewatch	NYS	1.4 km	MPC · JPL
412683	2014 OK_{231}	—	September 16, 2003	Kitt Peak	Spacewatch	·	2.4 km	MPC · JPL
412684	2014 OT_{231}	—	October 26, 2009	Catalina	CSS	EOS	2.7 km	MPC · JPL
412685	2014 OV_{232}	—	April 24, 2007	Mount Lemmon	Mount Lemmon Survey	·	2.8 km	MPC · JPL
412686	2014 OP_{234}	—	September 5, 2010	Mount Lemmon	Mount Lemmon Survey	·	1.2 km	MPC · JPL
412687 Shaxigao	2014 OW_{234}	Shaxigao	August 13, 2007	XuYi	PMO NEO Survey Program	·	850 m	MPC · JPL
412688	2014 OT_{240}	—	September 13, 2007	Mount Lemmon	Mount Lemmon Survey	·	920 m	MPC · JPL
412689	2014 OF_{251}	—	August 30, 2003	Kitt Peak	Spacewatch	·	4.0 km	MPC · JPL
412690	2014 OC_{256}	—	October 6, 2004	Kitt Peak	Spacewatch	·	2.0 km	MPC · JPL
412691	2014 OU_{256}	—	February 7, 2008	Kitt Peak	Spacewatch	·	1.8 km	MPC · JPL
412692	2014 OF_{257}	—	July 18, 2006	Siding Spring	SSS	·	1.5 km	MPC · JPL
412693	2014 OL_{258}	—	March 15, 2004	Kitt Peak	Spacewatch	·	1.8 km	MPC · JPL
412694	2014 OS_{258}	—	December 19, 2003	Kitt Peak	Spacewatch	EUN	1.3 km	MPC · JPL
412695	2014 OQ_{259}	—	December 30, 2005	Kitt Peak	Spacewatch	·	3.2 km	MPC · JPL
412696	2014 OF_{274}	—	April 6, 2005	Catalina	CSS	RAF	1.0 km	MPC · JPL
412697	2014 OW_{276}	—	August 31, 2003	Kitt Peak	Spacewatch	·	3.5 km	MPC · JPL
412698	2014 OB_{277}	—	January 20, 2002	Kitt Peak	Spacewatch	·	1.4 km	MPC · JPL
412699	2014 OE_{277}	—	October 10, 1999	Kitt Peak	Spacewatch	NYS	1.2 km	MPC · JPL
412700	2014 OL_{277}	—	July 2, 2005	Kitt Peak	Spacewatch	·	1.4 km	MPC · JPL

== 412701–412800 ==
back to top

Designation			Discovery			Properties		Ref
Permanent	Provisional	Named after	Date	Site	Discoverer(s)	Category	Diam.	Ref
412701	2014 OH_{279}	—	November 10, 2004	Kitt Peak	Spacewatch	·	2.6 km	MPC · JPL
412702	2014 OD_{280}	—	September 8, 2004	Socorro	LINEAR	·	1.8 km	MPC · JPL
412703	2014 OD_{286}	—	April 26, 1993	Kitt Peak	Spacewatch	·	770 m	MPC · JPL
412704	2014 OT_{292}	—	December 10, 2006	Kitt Peak	Spacewatch	MRX	1.0 km	MPC · JPL
412705	2014 OC_{293}	—	February 2, 2006	Kitt Peak	Spacewatch	·	4.1 km	MPC · JPL
412706	2014 OE_{294}	—	February 25, 2006	Kitt Peak	Spacewatch	·	770 m	MPC · JPL
412707	2014 OL_{294}	—	September 28, 2000	Kitt Peak	Spacewatch	·	2.0 km	MPC · JPL
412708	2014 OV_{294}	—	March 13, 2007	Mount Lemmon	Mount Lemmon Survey	·	560 m	MPC · JPL
412709	2014 OB_{295}	—	October 20, 2006	Mount Lemmon	Mount Lemmon Survey	·	1.3 km	MPC · JPL
412710	2014 OY_{295}	—	March 26, 2010	WISE	WISE	CYB	3.7 km	MPC · JPL
412711	2014 OF_{296}	—	December 29, 2003	Kitt Peak	Spacewatch	·	1.3 km	MPC · JPL
412712	2014 OJ_{297}	—	March 7, 2008	Kitt Peak	Spacewatch	·	1.4 km	MPC · JPL
412713	2014 OA_{298}	—	September 7, 2000	Kitt Peak	Spacewatch	·	2.7 km	MPC · JPL
412714	2014 OH_{298}	—	August 30, 2005	Anderson Mesa	LONEOS	·	2.2 km	MPC · JPL
412715	2014 OH_{299}	—	November 18, 2007	Mount Lemmon	Mount Lemmon Survey	·	1.2 km	MPC · JPL
412716	2014 OP_{299}	—	July 11, 2005	Kitt Peak	Spacewatch	·	1.5 km	MPC · JPL
412717	2014 OA_{307}	—	September 5, 2007	Catalina	CSS	PHO	1.1 km	MPC · JPL
412718	2014 OM_{310}	—	March 15, 2010	Mount Lemmon	Mount Lemmon Survey	·	730 m	MPC · JPL
412719	2014 OP_{316}	—	September 17, 2006	Catalina	CSS	MAR	1.4 km	MPC · JPL
412720	2014 OX_{316}	—	April 10, 2013	Mount Lemmon	Mount Lemmon Survey	·	3.5 km	MPC · JPL
412721	2014 OP_{329}	—	December 14, 2010	Mount Lemmon	Mount Lemmon Survey	·	4.0 km	MPC · JPL
412722	2014 OR_{333}	—	March 9, 2007	Catalina	CSS	BRA	2.1 km	MPC · JPL
412723	2014 OX_{333}	—	March 3, 2006	Kitt Peak	Spacewatch	·	670 m	MPC · JPL
412724	2014 OM_{334}	—	March 24, 2006	Mount Lemmon	Mount Lemmon Survey	·	1.1 km	MPC · JPL
412725	2014 OT_{339}	—	December 22, 2003	Kitt Peak	Spacewatch	·	1.2 km	MPC · JPL
412726	2014 OO_{341}	—	September 4, 2000	Kitt Peak	Spacewatch	·	1.3 km	MPC · JPL
412727	2014 OX_{343}	—	September 19, 2003	Kitt Peak	Spacewatch	·	3.2 km	MPC · JPL
412728	2014 OA_{344}	—	December 20, 2004	Mount Lemmon	Mount Lemmon Survey	EUP	4.1 km	MPC · JPL
412729	2014 OG_{344}	—	May 10, 2010	Mount Lemmon	Mount Lemmon Survey	PHO	2.9 km	MPC · JPL
412730	2014 OR_{346}	—	October 23, 2006	Kitt Peak	Spacewatch	·	2.0 km	MPC · JPL
412731	2014 OV_{346}	—	January 18, 1998	Kitt Peak	Spacewatch	·	1.1 km	MPC · JPL
412732	2014 OT_{347}	—	March 10, 2005	Mount Lemmon	Mount Lemmon Survey	(5)	1.2 km	MPC · JPL
412733	2014 OY_{349}	—	February 19, 2009	Kitt Peak	Spacewatch	·	1.5 km	MPC · JPL
412734	2014 OF_{353}	—	January 31, 2008	Mount Lemmon	Mount Lemmon Survey	·	1.8 km	MPC · JPL
412735	2014 OD_{355}	—	October 1, 2003	Kitt Peak	Spacewatch	NYS	880 m	MPC · JPL
412736	2014 OV_{355}	—	August 29, 2006	Kitt Peak	Spacewatch	EUN	1.0 km	MPC · JPL
412737	2014 OP_{358}	—	July 12, 2005	Mount Lemmon	Mount Lemmon Survey	·	3.6 km	MPC · JPL
412738	2014 OA_{359}	—	September 15, 2006	Kitt Peak	Spacewatch	·	940 m	MPC · JPL
412739	2014 OS_{359}	—	March 17, 2004	Kitt Peak	Spacewatch	·	1.9 km	MPC · JPL
412740	2014 OY_{359}	—	February 4, 2009	Mount Lemmon	Mount Lemmon Survey	·	1.2 km	MPC · JPL
412741	2014 OE_{360}	—	January 21, 2010	WISE	WISE	·	5.0 km	MPC · JPL
412742	2014 OK_{360}	—	October 8, 2010	Kitt Peak	Spacewatch	·	1.8 km	MPC · JPL
412743	2014 OV_{360}	—	August 29, 2009	Kitt Peak	Spacewatch	·	2.5 km	MPC · JPL
412744	2014 OD_{362}	—	January 13, 2004	Kitt Peak	Spacewatch	·	970 m	MPC · JPL
412745	2014 OX_{362}	—	January 31, 2006	Kitt Peak	Spacewatch	·	930 m	MPC · JPL
412746	2014 OO_{363}	—	November 25, 2005	Kitt Peak	Spacewatch	·	1.6 km	MPC · JPL
412747	2014 OB_{367}	—	March 14, 2007	Kitt Peak	Spacewatch	·	1.1 km	MPC · JPL
412748	2014 OD_{367}	—	February 22, 2009	Mount Lemmon	Mount Lemmon Survey	·	1.3 km	MPC · JPL
412749	2014 OV_{368}	—	January 10, 2008	Kitt Peak	Spacewatch	·	1.7 km	MPC · JPL
412750	2014 OV_{369}	—	December 3, 2010	Mount Lemmon	Mount Lemmon Survey	·	1.6 km	MPC · JPL
412751	2014 OC_{370}	—	November 22, 2005	Kitt Peak	Spacewatch	·	1.8 km	MPC · JPL
412752	2014 OE_{370}	—	November 19, 1996	Kitt Peak	Spacewatch	·	1.3 km	MPC · JPL
412753	2014 OP_{374}	—	January 7, 2006	Kitt Peak	Spacewatch	HYG	3.3 km	MPC · JPL
412754	2014 OF_{375}	—	September 17, 2006	Catalina	CSS	EUN	1.3 km	MPC · JPL
412755	2014 OA_{376}	—	February 4, 2006	Kitt Peak	Spacewatch	·	3.0 km	MPC · JPL
412756	2014 OE_{377}	—	February 5, 1995	Kitt Peak	Spacewatch	V	670 m	MPC · JPL
412757	2014 OW_{377}	—	September 15, 2007	Kitt Peak	Spacewatch	NYS	1.2 km	MPC · JPL
412758	2014 OU_{378}	—	September 7, 2004	Kitt Peak	Spacewatch	·	1.9 km	MPC · JPL
412759	2014 OJ_{380}	—	July 7, 2010	WISE	WISE	·	2.1 km	MPC · JPL
412760	2014 OX_{380}	—	February 27, 2006	Mount Lemmon	Mount Lemmon Survey	·	3.1 km	MPC · JPL
412761	2014 OF_{381}	—	August 16, 2009	Kitt Peak	Spacewatch	TEL	1.6 km	MPC · JPL
412762	2014 OC_{382}	—	October 22, 2005	Kitt Peak	Spacewatch	KOR	1.3 km	MPC · JPL
412763	2014 OK_{384}	—	March 9, 2006	Catalina	CSS	·	1.7 km	MPC · JPL
412764	2014 OE_{385}	—	April 23, 2007	Mount Lemmon	Mount Lemmon Survey	EOS	2.1 km	MPC · JPL
412765	2014 OP_{385}	—	December 1, 2005	Kitt Peak	Spacewatch	·	1 km	MPC · JPL
412766	2014 OD_{386}	—	September 26, 2008	Kitt Peak	Spacewatch	·	530 m	MPC · JPL
412767	2014 OO_{386}	—	November 10, 1999	Kitt Peak	Spacewatch	·	2.0 km	MPC · JPL
412768	2014 OQ_{386}	—	March 12, 2007	Catalina	CSS	EOS	1.8 km	MPC · JPL
412769	2014 OS_{386}	—	September 25, 2009	Catalina	CSS	·	3.2 km	MPC · JPL
412770	2014 OB_{387}	—	August 22, 2004	Kitt Peak	Spacewatch	·	2.1 km	MPC · JPL
412771	2014 OC_{387}	—	September 15, 2004	Kitt Peak	Spacewatch	·	2.4 km	MPC · JPL
412772	2014 OD_{387}	—	August 31, 2005	Kitt Peak	Spacewatch	AGN	1.0 km	MPC · JPL
412773	2014 ON_{387}	—	January 28, 2006	Kitt Peak	Spacewatch	·	1.1 km	MPC · JPL
412774	2014 OU_{388}	—	March 4, 2005	Mount Lemmon	Mount Lemmon Survey	·	1.2 km	MPC · JPL
412775	2014 OP_{389}	—	September 12, 1994	Kitt Peak	Spacewatch	·	1.1 km	MPC · JPL
412776	2014 OS_{390}	—	October 7, 1999	Socorro	LINEAR	NYS	1.4 km	MPC · JPL
412777	2014 PY_{2}	—	October 13, 2007	Catalina	CSS	·	1.3 km	MPC · JPL
412778	2014 PB_{6}	—	June 22, 2007	Kitt Peak	Spacewatch	V	680 m	MPC · JPL
412779	2014 PS_{6}	—	March 29, 2008	Kitt Peak	Spacewatch	·	1.9 km	MPC · JPL
412780	2014 PL_{10}	—	February 12, 2004	Kitt Peak	Spacewatch	MAR	1.2 km	MPC · JPL
412781	2014 PS_{10}	—	January 9, 2006	Kitt Peak	Spacewatch	VER	3.0 km	MPC · JPL
412782	2014 PZ_{11}	—	May 27, 2008	Kitt Peak	Spacewatch	TEL	1.5 km	MPC · JPL
412783	2014 PY_{12}	—	October 1, 1998	Kitt Peak	Spacewatch	·	1.2 km	MPC · JPL
412784	2014 PX_{13}	—	January 19, 2012	Kitt Peak	Spacewatch	ADE	2.0 km	MPC · JPL
412785	2014 PQ_{15}	—	October 30, 2005	Mount Lemmon	Mount Lemmon Survey	KOR	1.4 km	MPC · JPL
412786	2014 PB_{17}	—	February 22, 2007	Kitt Peak	Spacewatch	EOS	1.8 km	MPC · JPL
412787	2014 PE_{17}	—	November 1, 2005	Mount Lemmon	Mount Lemmon Survey	·	2.0 km	MPC · JPL
412788	2014 PA_{19}	—	March 26, 1993	Kitt Peak	Spacewatch	·	2.3 km	MPC · JPL
412789	2014 PC_{19}	—	January 1, 2008	Mount Lemmon	Mount Lemmon Survey	(5)	1.4 km	MPC · JPL
412790	2014 PZ_{20}	—	February 24, 2006	Kitt Peak	Spacewatch	·	960 m	MPC · JPL
412791	2014 PT_{21}	—	September 14, 2005	Kitt Peak	Spacewatch	·	1.9 km	MPC · JPL
412792	2014 PU_{21}	—	May 3, 2005	Kitt Peak	Spacewatch	·	1.4 km	MPC · JPL
412793	2014 PW_{21}	—	October 16, 2006	Catalina	CSS	(5)	1.2 km	MPC · JPL
412794	2014 PN_{22}	—	August 8, 2004	Anderson Mesa	LONEOS	·	2.6 km	MPC · JPL
412795	2014 PQ_{22}	—	October 18, 2003	Kitt Peak	Spacewatch	·	1.0 km	MPC · JPL
412796	2014 PS_{22}	—	September 1, 2005	Kitt Peak	Spacewatch	AGN	1.1 km	MPC · JPL
412797	2014 PZ_{22}	—	April 10, 2005	Kitt Peak	Spacewatch	·	1 km	MPC · JPL
412798	2014 PF_{23}	—	October 2, 2009	Mount Lemmon	Mount Lemmon Survey	·	3.1 km	MPC · JPL
412799	2014 PB_{25}	—	September 18, 2010	Mount Lemmon	Mount Lemmon Survey	·	2.0 km	MPC · JPL
412800	2014 PG_{25}	—	September 26, 2006	Catalina	CSS	KON	1.3 km	MPC · JPL

== 412801–412900 ==
back to top

Designation			Discovery			Properties		Ref
Permanent	Provisional	Named after	Date	Site	Discoverer(s)	Category	Diam.	Ref
412801	2014 PK_{27}	—	December 12, 1999	Kitt Peak	Spacewatch	·	1.4 km	MPC · JPL
412802	2014 PH_{28}	—	October 8, 2004	Kitt Peak	Spacewatch	·	2.1 km	MPC · JPL
412803	2014 PK_{28}	—	August 16, 2009	Kitt Peak	Spacewatch	·	1.8 km	MPC · JPL
412804	2014 PT_{28}	—	October 1, 2003	Kitt Peak	Spacewatch	·	1.5 km	MPC · JPL
412805	2014 PG_{29}	—	March 21, 2002	Kitt Peak	Spacewatch	MAS	760 m	MPC · JPL
412806	2014 PH_{29}	—	October 16, 2009	Catalina	CSS	LIX	3.1 km	MPC · JPL
412807	2014 PC_{30}	—	February 24, 2006	Kitt Peak	Spacewatch	·	1.0 km	MPC · JPL
412808	2014 PJ_{32}	—	December 28, 2005	Kitt Peak	Spacewatch	·	1.9 km	MPC · JPL
412809	2014 PV_{32}	—	February 2, 2008	Kitt Peak	Spacewatch	·	1.4 km	MPC · JPL
412810	2014 PP_{34}	—	September 14, 2007	Catalina	CSS	·	1.1 km	MPC · JPL
412811	2014 PA_{35}	—	February 26, 2008	Mount Lemmon	Mount Lemmon Survey	·	1.2 km	MPC · JPL
412812	2014 PL_{36}	—	March 8, 2008	Mount Lemmon	Mount Lemmon Survey	·	1.8 km	MPC · JPL
412813	2014 PU_{36}	—	September 19, 2003	Kitt Peak	Spacewatch	·	2.7 km	MPC · JPL
412814	2014 PN_{37}	—	August 28, 2005	Kitt Peak	Spacewatch	·	1.4 km	MPC · JPL
412815	2014 PT_{37}	—	January 28, 2007	Mount Lemmon	Mount Lemmon Survey	·	2.2 km	MPC · JPL
412816	2014 PG_{38}	—	April 26, 2007	Mount Lemmon	Mount Lemmon Survey	·	880 m	MPC · JPL
412817	2014 PO_{38}	—	November 19, 2009	Mount Lemmon	Mount Lemmon Survey	THM	2.7 km	MPC · JPL
412818	2014 PE_{39}	—	February 17, 2004	Kitt Peak	Spacewatch	·	1.7 km	MPC · JPL
412819	2014 PQ_{39}	—	February 25, 2007	Mount Lemmon	Mount Lemmon Survey	·	2.1 km	MPC · JPL
412820	2014 PU_{39}	—	January 28, 2006	Mount Lemmon	Mount Lemmon Survey	·	3.4 km	MPC · JPL
412821	2014 PV_{39}	—	May 1, 2003	Kitt Peak	Spacewatch	KOR	1.3 km	MPC · JPL
412822	2014 PP_{40}	—	September 19, 2003	Kitt Peak	Spacewatch	·	810 m	MPC · JPL
412823	2014 PU_{40}	—	October 21, 2001	Kitt Peak	Spacewatch	·	1.7 km	MPC · JPL
412824	2014 PF_{41}	—	February 21, 2007	Mount Lemmon	Mount Lemmon Survey	·	2.2 km	MPC · JPL
412825	2014 PK_{41}	—	October 11, 2004	Kitt Peak	Spacewatch	·	2.2 km	MPC · JPL
412826	2014 PF_{42}	—	March 11, 2007	Kitt Peak	Spacewatch	·	2.8 km	MPC · JPL
412827	2014 PK_{42}	—	April 26, 2007	Mount Lemmon	Mount Lemmon Survey	·	3.8 km	MPC · JPL
412828	2014 PU_{44}	—	January 27, 2006	Kitt Peak	Spacewatch	·	3.0 km	MPC · JPL
412829	2014 PY_{44}	—	December 31, 1999	Kitt Peak	Spacewatch	·	950 m	MPC · JPL
412830	2014 PP_{45}	—	January 4, 2003	Kitt Peak	Spacewatch	·	1.9 km	MPC · JPL
412831	2014 PQ_{45}	—	February 17, 2007	Kitt Peak	Spacewatch	·	560 m	MPC · JPL
412832	2014 PB_{46}	—	September 11, 2004	Kitt Peak	Spacewatch	·	1.6 km	MPC · JPL
412833	2014 PN_{46}	—	September 12, 1998	Kitt Peak	Spacewatch	·	2.2 km	MPC · JPL
412834	2014 PQ_{46}	—	December 25, 2005	Kitt Peak	Spacewatch	HYG	3.1 km	MPC · JPL
412835	2014 PP_{48}	—	September 23, 2009	Kitt Peak	Spacewatch	·	2.6 km	MPC · JPL
412836	2014 PW_{48}	—	April 11, 2005	Mount Lemmon	Mount Lemmon Survey	·	1.1 km	MPC · JPL
412837	2014 PP_{49}	—	February 14, 2010	Mount Lemmon	Mount Lemmon Survey	·	620 m	MPC · JPL
412838	2014 PB_{50}	—	February 1, 2006	Mount Lemmon	Mount Lemmon Survey	·	950 m	MPC · JPL
412839	2014 PC_{50}	—	September 16, 2003	Kitt Peak	Spacewatch	·	2.7 km	MPC · JPL
412840	2014 PF_{50}	—	September 19, 2009	Kitt Peak	Spacewatch	EOS	1.8 km	MPC · JPL
412841	2014 PY_{50}	—	December 24, 2005	Kitt Peak	Spacewatch	·	2.7 km	MPC · JPL
412842	2014 PB_{52}	—	February 9, 2005	Mount Lemmon	Mount Lemmon Survey	·	1.4 km	MPC · JPL
412843	2014 PM_{52}	—	January 31, 2006	Mount Lemmon	Mount Lemmon Survey	·	2.5 km	MPC · JPL
412844	2014 PS_{52}	—	August 29, 2005	Kitt Peak	Spacewatch	·	1.6 km	MPC · JPL
412845	2014 PV_{52}	—	September 12, 2009	Kitt Peak	Spacewatch	·	2.2 km	MPC · JPL
412846	2014 PF_{53}	—	December 19, 2004	Mount Lemmon	Mount Lemmon Survey	·	1.4 km	MPC · JPL
412847	2014 PL_{53}	—	March 10, 2007	Mount Lemmon	Mount Lemmon Survey	·	2.0 km	MPC · JPL
412848	2014 PR_{53}	—	February 28, 2008	Mount Lemmon	Mount Lemmon Survey	·	1.3 km	MPC · JPL
412849	2014 PO_{54}	—	September 17, 1998	Kitt Peak	Spacewatch	THM	1.9 km	MPC · JPL
412850	2014 PL_{55}	—	March 29, 2008	Kitt Peak	Spacewatch	·	2.0 km	MPC · JPL
412851	2014 PY_{55}	—	October 1, 2005	Anderson Mesa	LONEOS	·	2.5 km	MPC · JPL
412852	2014 PL_{56}	—	September 11, 2007	Mount Lemmon	Mount Lemmon Survey	(2076)	700 m	MPC · JPL
412853	2014 PQ_{56}	—	September 20, 2003	Socorro	LINEAR	·	980 m	MPC · JPL
412854	2014 PT_{56}	—	October 3, 2003	Kitt Peak	Spacewatch	·	3.3 km	MPC · JPL
412855	2014 PU_{56}	—	June 6, 2002	Socorro	LINEAR	·	1.7 km	MPC · JPL
412856	2014 PY_{57}	—	February 16, 2009	Kitt Peak	Spacewatch	·	1.3 km	MPC · JPL
412857	2014 PK_{62}	—	October 1, 2005	Anderson Mesa	LONEOS	·	2.1 km	MPC · JPL
412858	2014 PD_{63}	—	January 1, 2009	Mount Lemmon	Mount Lemmon Survey	·	1.5 km	MPC · JPL
412859	2014 PH_{64}	—	September 19, 2009	Kitt Peak	Spacewatch	·	2.5 km	MPC · JPL
412860	2014 PX_{64}	—	June 17, 2005	Mount Lemmon	Mount Lemmon Survey	·	2.3 km	MPC · JPL
412861	2014 PO_{67}	—	February 4, 2009	Kitt Peak	Spacewatch	·	560 m	MPC · JPL
412862	2014 PV_{69}	—	September 16, 2003	Kitt Peak	Spacewatch	NYS	1.2 km	MPC · JPL
412863	2014 PH_{70}	—	January 31, 2006	Kitt Peak	Spacewatch	·	810 m	MPC · JPL
412864	2014 PJ_{70}	—	September 16, 2009	Mount Lemmon	Mount Lemmon Survey	·	3.5 km	MPC · JPL
412865	2014 QT	—	March 26, 2006	Mount Lemmon	Mount Lemmon Survey	NYS	1.1 km	MPC · JPL
412866	2014 QC_{1}	—	August 7, 2004	Campo Imperatore	CINEOS	·	2.5 km	MPC · JPL
412867	2014 QF_{1}	—	August 4, 2010	Socorro	LINEAR	V	760 m	MPC · JPL
412868	2014 QO_{1}	—	April 25, 2006	Kitt Peak	Spacewatch	V	670 m	MPC · JPL
412869	2014 QP_{2}	—	March 23, 2003	Kitt Peak	Spacewatch	·	800 m	MPC · JPL
412870	2014 QL_{3}	—	October 18, 2003	Kitt Peak	Spacewatch	·	1.2 km	MPC · JPL
412871	2014 QB_{10}	—	May 13, 1996	Kitt Peak	Spacewatch	TIR	4.3 km	MPC · JPL
412872	2014 QR_{15}	—	November 3, 2005	Kitt Peak	Spacewatch	TRE	2.9 km	MPC · JPL
412873	2014 QV_{15}	—	July 5, 2005	Kitt Peak	Spacewatch	·	2.0 km	MPC · JPL
412874	2014 QK_{18}	—	August 10, 2007	Kitt Peak	Spacewatch	·	1.4 km	MPC · JPL
412875	2014 QL_{18}	—	May 4, 2006	Mount Lemmon	Mount Lemmon Survey	·	1.0 km	MPC · JPL
412876	2014 QU_{18}	—	November 2, 2007	Mount Lemmon	Mount Lemmon Survey	V	640 m	MPC · JPL
412877	2014 QE_{21}	—	February 9, 2008	Catalina	CSS	·	2.2 km	MPC · JPL
412878	2014 QA_{24}	—	September 17, 2003	Kitt Peak	Spacewatch	·	910 m	MPC · JPL
412879	2014 QG_{24}	—	October 8, 2008	Mount Lemmon	Mount Lemmon Survey	CYB	3.1 km	MPC · JPL
412880	2014 QB_{25}	—	December 29, 2011	Kitt Peak	Spacewatch	GEF	1.4 km	MPC · JPL
412881	2014 QD_{25}	—	December 28, 2005	Kitt Peak	Spacewatch	·	820 m	MPC · JPL
412882	2014 QZ_{25}	—	April 15, 2008	Mount Lemmon	Mount Lemmon Survey	·	1.9 km	MPC · JPL
412883	2014 QH_{28}	—	October 11, 2010	Mount Lemmon	Mount Lemmon Survey	·	1.4 km	MPC · JPL
412884	2014 QE_{30}	—	November 19, 2006	Kitt Peak	Spacewatch	·	1.5 km	MPC · JPL
412885	2014 QF_{30}	—	November 22, 2006	Catalina	CSS	MAR	1.1 km	MPC · JPL
412886	2014 QG_{33}	—	January 15, 2004	Kitt Peak	Spacewatch	·	1.6 km	MPC · JPL
412887	2014 QJ_{36}	—	September 20, 2001	Socorro	LINEAR	·	640 m	MPC · JPL
412888	2014 QM_{37}	—	October 29, 2005	Mount Lemmon	Mount Lemmon Survey	·	530 m	MPC · JPL
412889	2014 QX_{39}	—	December 28, 2005	Kitt Peak	Spacewatch	EOS	2.4 km	MPC · JPL
412890	2014 QT_{40}	—	May 3, 2005	Catalina	CSS	·	2.7 km	MPC · JPL
412891	2014 QX_{49}	—	September 29, 2011	Mount Lemmon	Mount Lemmon Survey	V	710 m	MPC · JPL
412892	2014 QP_{52}	—	September 30, 2005	Mount Lemmon	Mount Lemmon Survey	KOR	1.2 km	MPC · JPL
412893	2014 QL_{54}	—	October 24, 2004	Kitt Peak	Spacewatch	·	1.2 km	MPC · JPL
412894	2014 QW_{62}	—	November 18, 2006	Mount Lemmon	Mount Lemmon Survey	·	1.8 km	MPC · JPL
412895	2014 QY_{64}	—	September 2, 2010	Mount Lemmon	Mount Lemmon Survey	·	1.3 km	MPC · JPL
412896	2014 QQ_{70}	—	December 26, 2005	Kitt Peak	Spacewatch	·	3.0 km	MPC · JPL
412897	2014 QE_{78}	—	January 13, 2002	Kitt Peak	Spacewatch	·	2.2 km	MPC · JPL
412898	2014 QW_{78}	—	March 15, 2007	Kitt Peak	Spacewatch	·	3.0 km	MPC · JPL
412899	2014 QW_{81}	—	November 6, 2005	Mount Lemmon	Mount Lemmon Survey	·	2.2 km	MPC · JPL
412900	2014 QV_{95}	—	October 24, 2005	Mauna Kea	A. Boattini	·	4.3 km	MPC · JPL

== 412901–413000 ==
back to top

Designation			Discovery			Properties		Ref
Permanent	Provisional	Named after	Date	Site	Discoverer(s)	Category	Diam.	Ref
412901	2014 QV_{97}	—	September 16, 2003	Kitt Peak	Spacewatch	·	3.6 km	MPC · JPL
412902	2014 QX_{97}	—	September 17, 1996	Kitt Peak	Spacewatch	·	1.9 km	MPC · JPL
412903	2014 QS_{98}	—	October 16, 2006	Kitt Peak	Spacewatch	WIT	810 m	MPC · JPL
412904	2014 QK_{101}	—	March 11, 2007	Kitt Peak	Spacewatch	·	3.0 km	MPC · JPL
412905	2014 QH_{102}	—	October 4, 2006	Mount Lemmon	Mount Lemmon Survey	·	1.6 km	MPC · JPL
412906	2014 QG_{106}	—	January 20, 2009	Mount Lemmon	Mount Lemmon Survey	V	750 m	MPC · JPL
412907	2014 QA_{112}	—	October 17, 2006	Mount Lemmon	Mount Lemmon Survey	·	1.8 km	MPC · JPL
412908	2014 QH_{118}	—	December 28, 2005	Kitt Peak	Spacewatch	KOR	1.2 km	MPC · JPL
412909	2014 QV_{120}	—	October 20, 1995	Kitt Peak	Spacewatch	·	1.6 km	MPC · JPL
412910	2014 QE_{122}	—	September 19, 1995	Kitt Peak	Spacewatch	·	1.3 km	MPC · JPL
412911	2014 QY_{130}	—	April 5, 2005	Mount Lemmon	Mount Lemmon Survey	·	1.2 km	MPC · JPL
412912	2014 QY_{131}	—	January 23, 2006	Kitt Peak	Spacewatch	·	2.3 km	MPC · JPL
412913	2014 QA_{133}	—	October 20, 1995	Kitt Peak	Spacewatch	·	1.0 km	MPC · JPL
412914	2014 QR_{136}	—	May 27, 2003	Kitt Peak	Spacewatch	·	730 m	MPC · JPL
412915	2014 QT_{137}	—	February 17, 2007	Kitt Peak	Spacewatch	·	2.9 km	MPC · JPL
412916	2014 QR_{138}	—	December 16, 2007	Mount Lemmon	Mount Lemmon Survey	·	1.3 km	MPC · JPL
412917	2014 QS_{139}	—	October 11, 2004	Kitt Peak	Spacewatch	·	590 m	MPC · JPL
412918	2014 QD_{140}	—	October 8, 2007	Kitt Peak	Spacewatch	·	1.2 km	MPC · JPL
412919	2014 QK_{141}	—	November 25, 2005	Mount Lemmon	Mount Lemmon Survey	·	2.5 km	MPC · JPL
412920	2014 QX_{144}	—	March 10, 2005	Mount Lemmon	Mount Lemmon Survey	V	630 m	MPC · JPL
412921	2014 QK_{145}	—	February 21, 2007	Mount Lemmon	Mount Lemmon Survey	·	1.7 km	MPC · JPL
412922	2014 QL_{149}	—	March 2, 2006	Kitt Peak	Spacewatch	·	800 m	MPC · JPL
412923	2014 QC_{150}	—	October 8, 2010	Catalina	CSS	·	1.4 km	MPC · JPL
412924	2014 QD_{150}	—	February 1, 2003	Kitt Peak	Spacewatch	·	900 m	MPC · JPL
412925	2014 QF_{152}	—	May 13, 2004	Kitt Peak	Spacewatch	·	2.2 km	MPC · JPL
412926	2014 QS_{152}	—	September 5, 2010	Mount Lemmon	Mount Lemmon Survey	·	2.1 km	MPC · JPL
412927	2014 QZ_{152}	—	October 8, 2004	Anderson Mesa	LONEOS	·	2.3 km	MPC · JPL
412928	2014 QY_{170}	—	December 4, 2005	Mount Lemmon	Mount Lemmon Survey	·	1.7 km	MPC · JPL
412929	2014 QE_{172}	—	October 11, 2010	Mount Lemmon	Mount Lemmon Survey	·	1.7 km	MPC · JPL
412930	2014 QG_{172}	—	November 25, 2005	Mount Lemmon	Mount Lemmon Survey	KOR	1.5 km	MPC · JPL
412931	2014 QX_{175}	—	September 16, 2003	Kitt Peak	Spacewatch	·	3.0 km	MPC · JPL
412932	2014 QS_{179}	—	November 9, 1993	Kitt Peak	Spacewatch	·	840 m	MPC · JPL
412933	2014 QT_{179}	—	November 16, 2006	Mount Lemmon	Mount Lemmon Survey	·	2.2 km	MPC · JPL
412934	2014 QC_{180}	—	November 12, 2010	Kitt Peak	Spacewatch	·	2.1 km	MPC · JPL
412935	2014 QH_{188}	—	February 8, 2008	Catalina	CSS	·	1.7 km	MPC · JPL
412936	2014 QQ_{203}	—	April 27, 2006	Kitt Peak	Spacewatch	NYS	980 m	MPC · JPL
412937	2014 QD_{204}	—	October 11, 2004	Kitt Peak	Spacewatch	·	2.3 km	MPC · JPL
412938	2014 QY_{207}	—	November 21, 2006	Mount Lemmon	Mount Lemmon Survey	·	1.7 km	MPC · JPL
412939	2014 QY_{214}	—	September 30, 1999	Kitt Peak	Spacewatch	NYS	1.3 km	MPC · JPL
412940	2014 QS_{216}	—	November 21, 2009	Catalina	CSS	·	3.4 km	MPC · JPL
412941	2014 QY_{217}	—	March 29, 2009	Kitt Peak	Spacewatch	·	1.3 km	MPC · JPL
412942	2014 QQ_{224}	—	September 18, 2009	Kitt Peak	Spacewatch	·	2.0 km	MPC · JPL
412943	2014 QR_{225}	—	February 17, 2007	Mount Lemmon	Mount Lemmon Survey	·	1.7 km	MPC · JPL
412944	2014 QE_{227}	—	December 26, 2005	Mount Lemmon	Mount Lemmon Survey	·	1.8 km	MPC · JPL
412945	2014 QF_{227}	—	September 16, 2009	Kitt Peak	Spacewatch	·	2.5 km	MPC · JPL
412946	2014 QX_{228}	—	November 18, 2007	Kitt Peak	Spacewatch	·	1.0 km	MPC · JPL
412947	2014 QV_{229}	—	February 22, 2006	Catalina	CSS	·	3.1 km	MPC · JPL
412948	2014 QP_{230}	—	December 30, 2005	Catalina	CSS	·	2.6 km	MPC · JPL
412949	2014 QG_{238}	—	March 15, 2007	Kitt Peak	Spacewatch	·	2.3 km	MPC · JPL
412950	2014 QP_{240}	—	December 25, 2005	Kitt Peak	Spacewatch	·	2.3 km	MPC · JPL
412951	2014 QB_{241}	—	April 14, 2004	Kitt Peak	Spacewatch	·	1.3 km	MPC · JPL
412952	2014 QP_{244}	—	September 24, 2008	Mount Lemmon	Mount Lemmon Survey	CYB	4.8 km	MPC · JPL
412953	2014 QR_{245}	—	December 8, 2005	Kitt Peak	Spacewatch	TEL	1.8 km	MPC · JPL
412954	2014 QH_{259}	—	November 10, 2004	Kitt Peak	Spacewatch	·	3.1 km	MPC · JPL
412955	2014 QF_{270}	—	October 29, 2010	Mount Lemmon	Mount Lemmon Survey	AGN	1.1 km	MPC · JPL
412956	2014 QU_{270}	—	October 23, 2004	Kitt Peak	Spacewatch	V	650 m	MPC · JPL
412957	2014 QF_{271}	—	October 20, 2008	Kitt Peak	Spacewatch	·	980 m	MPC · JPL
412958	2014 QN_{277}	—	November 26, 2003	Kitt Peak	Spacewatch	·	1.3 km	MPC · JPL
412959	2014 QD_{280}	—	January 28, 2007	Mount Lemmon	Mount Lemmon Survey	·	2.7 km	MPC · JPL
412960	2014 QX_{283}	—	September 24, 2009	Catalina	CSS	·	2.3 km	MPC · JPL
412961	2014 QS_{290}	—	August 23, 2004	Anderson Mesa	LONEOS	·	900 m	MPC · JPL
412962	2014 QO_{300}	—	September 18, 2006	Kitt Peak	Spacewatch	·	1.1 km	MPC · JPL
412963	2014 QS_{300}	—	April 10, 2010	Mount Lemmon	Mount Lemmon Survey	·	2.0 km	MPC · JPL
412964	2014 QW_{300}	—	January 26, 2006	Kitt Peak	Spacewatch	·	5.2 km	MPC · JPL
412965	2014 QX_{304}	—	March 19, 2004	Kitt Peak	Spacewatch	MAR	1.0 km	MPC · JPL
412966	2014 QU_{306}	—	November 9, 2009	Socorro	LINEAR	·	2.9 km	MPC · JPL
412967	2014 QA_{309}	—	December 4, 2007	Kitt Peak	Spacewatch	MAS	870 m	MPC · JPL
412968	2014 QG_{309}	—	January 23, 2006	Kitt Peak	Spacewatch	·	890 m	MPC · JPL
412969	2014 QU_{336}	—	August 26, 2005	Palomar	NEAT	·	1.8 km	MPC · JPL
412970	2014 QV_{347}	—	June 13, 2004	Kitt Peak	Spacewatch	·	2.4 km	MPC · JPL
412971	2014 QJ_{351}	—	May 1, 2009	Kitt Peak	Spacewatch	·	1.4 km	MPC · JPL
412972	2014 QQ_{351}	—	February 27, 2006	Kitt Peak	Spacewatch	·	3.5 km	MPC · JPL
412973	2014 QN_{360}	—	September 28, 2000	Socorro	LINEAR	·	2.8 km	MPC · JPL
412974	2237 P-L	—	September 24, 1960	Palomar	C. J. van Houten, I. van Houten-Groeneveld, T. Gehrels	·	1.6 km	MPC · JPL
412975	5055 T-2	—	September 25, 1973	Palomar	C. J. van Houten, I. van Houten-Groeneveld, T. Gehrels	·	1.6 km	MPC · JPL
412976	1987 WC	—	November 21, 1987	Palomar	J. E. Mueller	AMO	370 m	MPC · JPL
412977	1990 UO	—	October 22, 1990	Kitt Peak	Spacewatch	APO	430 m	MPC · JPL
412978	1993 TB_{5}	—	October 8, 1993	Kitt Peak	Spacewatch	·	1.3 km	MPC · JPL
412979	1995 BH_{14}	—	January 31, 1995	Kitt Peak	Spacewatch	·	1.2 km	MPC · JPL
412980	1995 SL_{80}	—	September 26, 1995	Kitt Peak	Spacewatch	·	1.7 km	MPC · JPL
412981	1995 UE_{10}	—	October 16, 1995	Kitt Peak	Spacewatch	MAS	680 m	MPC · JPL
412982	1995 UN_{52}	—	October 22, 1995	Kitt Peak	Spacewatch	·	2.1 km	MPC · JPL
412983	1996 FO_{3}	—	March 24, 1996	Siding Spring	G. J. Garradd	AMO · PHA	330 m	MPC · JPL
412984	1996 TJ_{32}	—	October 9, 1996	Kitt Peak	Spacewatch	·	1.4 km	MPC · JPL
412985	1997 CT_{12}	—	February 3, 1997	Kitt Peak	Spacewatch	·	2.2 km	MPC · JPL
412986	1997 SC_{14}	—	September 28, 1997	Kitt Peak	Spacewatch	·	2.8 km	MPC · JPL
412987	1997 WM_{29}	—	November 30, 1997	Kitt Peak	Spacewatch	·	3.1 km	MPC · JPL
412988	1998 AP_{1}	—	January 1, 1998	Kitt Peak	Spacewatch	·	1.8 km	MPC · JPL
412989	1998 HA_{11}	—	April 17, 1998	Kitt Peak	Spacewatch	V	670 m	MPC · JPL
412990	1998 HM_{31}	—	April 23, 1998	Kitt Peak	Spacewatch	·	1.2 km	MPC · JPL
412991	1998 TO_{24}	—	October 14, 1998	Kitt Peak	Spacewatch	T_{j} (2.99) · 3:2 · SHU	4.8 km	MPC · JPL
412992	1998 VW_{40}	—	November 14, 1998	Kitt Peak	Spacewatch	·	3.4 km	MPC · JPL
412993	1998 VO_{48}	—	November 15, 1998	Kitt Peak	Spacewatch	·	1.2 km	MPC · JPL
412994	1999 GF_{56}	—	April 9, 1999	Kitt Peak	Spacewatch	·	690 m	MPC · JPL
412995	1999 LP_{28}	—	June 14, 1999	Socorro	LINEAR	AMO	350 m	MPC · JPL
412996	1999 ST_{16}	—	September 29, 1999	Catalina	CSS	·	2.3 km	MPC · JPL
412997	1999 TH_{43}	—	October 3, 1999	Kitt Peak	Spacewatch	NYS	1.0 km	MPC · JPL
412998	1999 TM_{84}	—	October 13, 1999	Kitt Peak	Spacewatch	V	710 m	MPC · JPL
412999	1999 TL_{129}	—	October 6, 1999	Socorro	LINEAR	·	1.4 km	MPC · JPL
413000	1999 TW_{261}	—	October 13, 1999	Socorro	LINEAR	NYS	1.1 km	MPC · JPL

back to top

== Meaning of names ==
As minor planet discoveries are confirmed, they are given a permanent number by the IAU's Minor Planet Center (MPC), and the discoverers can then submit names for them, following the IAU's naming conventions. The list below concerns those minor planets in the specified number-range that have received names, and explains the meanings of those names.

Official naming citations of newly named small Solar System bodies are approved and published in a bulletin by IAU's Working Group for Small Bodies Nomenclature (WGSBN). Before May 2021, citations were published in MPC's Minor Planet Circulars for many decades. Recent citations can also be found on the JPL Small-Body Database (SBDB). Until his death in 2016, German astronomer Lutz D. Schmadel compiled these citations into the Dictionary of Minor Planet Names (DMP) and regularly updated the collection.

Based on Paul Herget's The Names of the Minor Planets, Schmadel also researched the unclear origin of numerous asteroids, most of which had been named prior to World War II. This article incorporates text from this source, which is in the public domain: SBDB New namings may only be added to this list below after official publication as the preannouncement of names is condemned. The WGSBN publishes a comprehensive guideline for the naming rules of non-cometary small Solar System bodies.

Named minor planet	Provisional	This minor planet was named for...	Ref · Catalog
412536 Farquharson	2014 MF_{46}	Marian Farquharson, British naturalist and women’s rights activist.	IAU · 412536
412687 Shaxigao	2014 OW_{234}	Shaxigao (Shaxi high school of Jiangsu Province) is located in the city of Taicang, China.	IAU · 412687
