= Mueller (surname) =

Mueller is a spelling variant of the German surname Müller (miller). In German, the letter "ü" can be replaced with "ue". Notable people with this surname include:

== Acting and filmmaking ==
- Armin Mueller-Stahl (born 1930), German actor
- Brooke Mueller (born 1977), American actress
- Cookie Mueller (1949–1989), American actress
- Heidi Mueller (born 1982), American actress
- Jessie Mueller (born 1983), American actress and singer
- Mauro Mueller, Swiss Mexican narrative filmmaker
- William A. Mueller (1901–1992), American sound engineer

== Government ==
- Allan Mueller (1942–2024), American politician from Missouri
- Anne Mueller (1930–2000), British civil servant and academic
- August B. Mueller (1905–1996), American politician and farmer in Minnesota
- Fred A. Mueller (1868–?), American politician in Wisconsin
- Frederick H. Mueller (1893–1976), American politician
- Jacob Mueller (1822–1905), German-born American politician in Ohio
- James Mueller, American politician in Ohio
- James Mueller (mayor) (born 1982), American politician in Indiana
- Johannes Ferdinand Mueller (fl. 1875–1879), Australian postmaster
- Kimberly J. Mueller (born 1957), American judge in California
- Mike Mueller (born 1974), American politician in Michigan
- Otto Mueller (politician) (1875–1973), American politician in Wisconsin
- Robert Mueller (1944–2026), American lawyer, Director of the FBI and author of the Mueller Report
- Ursula Mueller, German foreign affairs figure
- Walter H. Mueller (c. 1925–2011), American politician in Missouri

== Journalism, writing, publishing ==
- Andrew Mueller, Australian-born, London-based journalist and author
- Gene Mueller (born 1942), American historian and author
- Jen Mueller (born 1978), American television and radio sports broadcast journalist
- Lisel Mueller (1924–2020), German-born American poet, translator, and teacher
- Marnie Mueller, American novelist
- Merrill Mueller (1916–1980), American journalist
- P. S. Mueller, American cartoonist and voice actor
- Pamela Bauer Mueller (born 1945), American author
- Wolfgang Philipp Mueller (born 1966), German founder of VDM Publishing

== Military ==
- Greta Bösel (née Mueller) (1908–1947), German concentration camp guard executed for war crimes
- Desmond Mueller (born 1943), Australian Army officer
- Paul J. Mueller (1892–1962), United States Army officer

== Music ==
- Caleb Mueller, known as Decomposure, Canadian electronic music mixer, graphic and visual artist
- Gussie Mueller (1890–1965), American jazz clarinetist
- Ivan Mueller (1786–1854), Russian clarinetist
- Jeff Mueller, American math-rock vocalist and guitarist
- Jon Mueller (born 1970), American drummer, percussionist, and composer
- Karl Mueller (rock musician) (1963–2005), American rock musician
- Mark Mueller, American songwriter
- Otto-Werner Mueller (1926–2016), German-born conductor in the United States
- Karl Friedrich Müller-Pfalz (1894–1969), German concert pianist and composer

== Painters and artisans ==
- Herman Carl Mueller (1854–1941), German-born ceramicist in the United States
- Otto Mueller (1874–1930), German Expressionist painter
- Stephen Mueller (1947–2011), American painter

== Religion ==
- Gerhard Ludwig Müller (born 1947), German Cardinal

== Science and education ==
- Alfred Mueller (born 1939), American theoretical physicist
- Brian Mueller, American academic and university administrator
- Dennis Mueller (born 1940), professor of economics at the University of Vienna
- Eva Mueller (1920–2006), American professor of economics
- Ferdinand von Mueller (1825–1896), German-Australian botanist
- Fritz Mueller (1907–2001), German engineer who later emigrated to the United States
- George Mueller (NASA) (1918–2015), American engineer who served as an associate administrator at NASA
- Gerhard Mueller (engineer) (1835–1918), German-born New Zealand surveyor, engineer and land commissioner
- Gustav Adolph Mueller (1864–1937), German-American architect, engineer, and sculptor
- Gustav Emil Mueller (1898–1987), Swiss philosopher
- Hans Mueller (physicist) (1900-1965), Swiss-American physicist, inventor of Mueller calculus
- Ivan I. Mueller (1930–2023), Hungarian-American geodesist
- Jean Mueller (born 1950), American astronomer
- Jennifer Mueller, American applied mathematician
- John Mueller (born 1937), American political scientist
- John Howard Mueller (1891–1954), American biochemist, pathologist, and bacteriologist
- Kai-Markus Mueller (born 1976), German neuroscientist, entrepreneur, and professor
- Kate Hevner Mueller (1898–1984), American educator
- Steffen Mueller, American virologist and professor
- Tom Mueller (born 1961), American rocket engineer

== Sports ==
=== Association football (soccer) ===
- Chris Mueller (soccer) (born 1996), American soccer player
- Danny Mueller (born 1966), American-born, Puerto Rico football player
- Taylor Mueller (born 1988), American soccer player

=== Baseball ===
- Bill Mueller (born 1971), American baseball player
- Bill Mueller (outfielder) (1920–2001), American baseball player
- Don Mueller (1927–2011), American baseball player
- Dorothy Mueller (1925–1985), American baseball player
- Gordie Mueller (1922–2006), American baseball player
- Heinie Mueller (second baseman) (1912–1986), American baseball player
- Heinie Mueller (outfielder) (1899–1975), American baseball player
- Jon Mueller (baseball) (born 1970), American baseball coach
- Les Mueller (1919–2012), American baseball player
- Ray Mueller (1912–1994), American baseball player
- Walter Mueller (1894–1971), American baseball player
- Willie Mueller (born 1956), American baseball player

=== Basketball ===
- Blaine Mueller, American basketball coach
- Earl Mueller (1903–1932), American basketball player
- Erwin Mueller (1944–2018), American basketball player
- Kit Mueller (born c. 1971), American basketball player
- Tex Mueller (1916–2012), American basketball player

=== Gridiron football ===
- Jamie Mueller (born 1964), American football player
- Marc Mueller (born 1989), Canadian football coach
- Randy Mueller (born 1961), American football executive
- Rick Mueller (born 1967), American football executive
- Ryan Mueller (born 1991), American football player
- Tom Mueller (American football) (born c. 1945), American football coach (Nebraska–Omaha)
- Tom Mueller (American football, born 1946), American football coach (Texas Lutheran)
- Vance Mueller (born 1964), American football player

=== Ice hockey ===
- Chris Mueller (ice hockey) (born 1986), American ice hockey player
- Greg Mueller (born 1971), Swiss-born ice hockey player in Germany; poker player
- Norbert Mueller (1906–1956), Canadian ice hockey player
- Peter Mueller (ice hockey) (born 1988), American ice hockey player
- Ty Mueller (born 2003), Canadian ice hockey player

=== Other ===
- Alexandra Mueller (born 1988), American tennis player
- Barbara Mueller (athlete) (born 1933), American track and field athlete
- Blake Mueller (born 1982), Australian rugby player
- Brock Mueller (born 1978), Australian rugby player
- Eric Mueller (born 1970), American rower
- Felice Mueller (born 1989), American rower
- Gunnar Mueller (born 1948), Swedish golfer
- Jack Mueller (1915–2001), Australian football player
- Julio Mueller (1905–1984), Mexican polo player
- Marcus Mueller (born 2005), American luger
- Melissa Mueller (born 1972), American pole vaulter
- Merv Mueller (1914–1984), Australian cricketer
- Michelle Mueller (fl. 2012), Canadian equestrian
- Peter Mueller (speed skater) (born 1954), American speed skater and coach

== Other fields ==
- Barbara R. Mueller (1925–2016), American philatelist
- Christoph Mueller (born 1961), German aviation business executive
- Christopher Mueller (disambiguation), several people
- Gordon H. Mueller (born 1940), American historian
- Gustave A. Mueller (1863–1912), American homeopath and surgeon
- Joseph Maximilian Mueller (1894–1981), American Catholic prelate
- Kayla Mueller (1988–2015), American human rights activist
- Peter Mueller (disambiguation), several people
- William Boyce Mueller (1942–1993), American scouting figure

== See also ==
- Müller (surname)
