= Gustave Mueller =

Gustave or Gustav Mueller may refer to:

- Gustave A. Mueller (1863–1912), American homeopath and surgeon
- Gussie Mueller (1890–1965), American jazz clarinetist
- Gustav Adolph Mueller (1864–1937), German-American architect
- Gustav Emil Mueller (1898–1987), philosopher

== See also ==
- Gustave Moeller (1881–1931), American painter
- Gustav Müller (disambiguation)
