= List of Kyle XY characters =

The following is a list of characters from the American science fiction mystery series Kyle XY, which premiered on ABC Family on June 26, 2006. The series follows a mysterious teenage boy of unknown origin who is taken in by a family from Seattle, and his attempts to solve the puzzles of who he is and why he has no memory.

== Main characters ==
- Kyle Trager (Matt Dallas) is the protagonist, a teenage boy with no bellybutton and no memory of who he is. His strange case is referred to Nicole Trager, a therapist who takes him home. Kyle must learn to do everyday things like eat and drink, speak, and avoid hurting himself. Season one follows Kyle as he learns about how people live, but nothing of who he is. Season two explains Kyle's existence, and he begins to discover his purpose. Kyle also discovers, in season 2, that he was created by scientists as an experiment. Throughout the show Kyle has encounters with scientific communities that know of his "special abilities" like Zzyzx, MadaCorp, and Latnok. His experiment name is "781227" or "XY". He is romantically interested in Amanda Bloom and then Jessi.
- Nicole Trager (Marguerite MacIntyre) is a psychologist who is assigned Kyle as a patient and decides to take him in as foster child. She is married to Stephen Trager, and has two other children: an older daughter named Lori and a son named Josh. Nicole is Kyle's main source of support and his moral anchor throughout the series.
- Stephen Trager (Bruce Thomas) is Nicole's husband. He is a well-paid software designer who directs a programming team. Stephen and Nicole are happily married and supportive of the kids.
- Lori Trager (April Matson) is the teenage daughter of Stephen and Nicole, as well as the older sister of Josh and Kyle. Lori sneaks out to date Declan and gets drunk at parties. She loves Declan, but they have something of an on and off romance, but in the third season she starts dating her father's TA, Mark. Lori confides in her best friend, Hillary.
- Josh Trager (Jean-Luc Bilodeau) is the son of Nicole and Stephen Trager, and the younger brother of Lori and Kyle. Josh is more interested in pornography than school, and is devoted to "G-Force" online gaming. He introduces Kyle to basketball. Josh struggles during the first season, first with getting admitted to high school then with getting out of remedial classes. Josh is a schemer with a mercenary personality, and is unintentionally predictive about Kyle. His only love throughout the series is Andy Jensen.
- Declan McDonough (Chris Olivero) is a spoiled rich kid and high school basketball star. He is the on and off boyfriend of Lori Trager, yet remains in love with her through the series. Declan's best friend is Charlie Tanner. He also becomes very close friends with Kyle, sharing Kyle's secrets and adventures throughout the series.
- Amanda Bloom (Kirsten Prout) is the girl who lives next door to the Tragers. Kyle is drawn to the sound of her piano and immediately falls in love with her. She also feels an attraction to Kyle, but her mother tries to keep them apart. Kyle is afraid that Amanda will not like him the same if she knows of his origins, though she learns about many of his strange ways and abilities. Their romance continues through the series, even though they break up in season 3, but in the last episode Amanda reveals to Jessi that she will tell Kyle that she wants him back.
- Jessi (Jaimie Alexander) is introduced in the second season. She arrives in the world in the same way as Kyle but shows a very different personality. About a day after Jessi is "born" she is found by one of MadaCorp's employees, Emily, then they give her a life-full of false memories that include Jessi being Emily's sister. In only small part of the second season does Jessi believe these memories are true, until Kyle reveals the truth about them. As the series progresses, she becomes an increasingly important part of Kyle's story and falls in love with him. Her experiment name is "781228" or "XX"

== Recurring characters ==
- Tom Foss (Nicholas Lea) is the antagonist in the first season, stalking Kyle in an old red truck. He appears increasingly dangerous as the series progresses and becomes pivotal to Kyle through the second season, but later on in season 2 he tries to help Kyle discover more powers and abilities.
- Carol Bloom (Teryl Rothery) is Amanda Bloom's mother and lives next door to the Tragers. She has a bad first impression of Kyle that continues throughout the series. She tries to prevent the relationship between Kyle and Amanda, but softens towards the relationship as the series progresses.
- Hillary (Chelan Simmons) is Lori's best friend, though she frequently fights with Lori. She makes a career decision in season two that has unexpected consequences for all the Trager kids.
- Charlie Tanner (Cory Monteith) is Declan's best friend and captain of the basketball team. He is Amanda's boyfriend, which prevents Kyle from directly pursuing her in season one. in the very beginning of season two Charlie and Amanda break up, which gives Kyle the opportunity to directly pursue her. His activities become more apparent and his friendship with Kyle grows during season two.
- Bradford Hooper (Malcolm Stewart) is the principal at Beachwood High School. He is proper, strict, and causes trouble for all of the Trager kids.
- Andy Jensen (Magda Apanowicz) meets Josh when he works at The Rack coffee shop. They had already been online gaming competitors, with 'andyJ' always winning their online battles. They meet again at school and quickly become friends, then later become a couple. She was raised by lesbian mothers and has terminal cancer, though Kyle somehow manages to cure her cancer with his "special abilities".
- Mark (Josh Zuckerman) is a student at University of Washington who Lori meets by accident at The Rack. She finds out too late that he is her father's teaching assistant. She wants his help with her music, though he offers her more than she asks for. Lori accepts Mark's offer with some conditions, which makes Declan jealous. Later on he becomes Lori's boyfriend.

== Season 1 characters ==
- Lou Daniels (Dorian Harewood) directs the Juvenile Detention Center where the naked boy is taken when he is arrested. Lou calls Nicole about the strange case, knowing that such cases are her specialty. Lou says that the boy's "good looks" remind him of his brother Kyle. When the boy responds to the name Kyle, Nicole decides to call him that.
- Detective Jason Breen (Kurt Max Runte) is assigned to investigate Kyle as a missing persons case. He contacts Kyle and the Tragers repeatedly with developments regarding Kyle's case.
- L.K. Deichman (Cascy Beddow) is a nerdy boy called "geekman" and "dykeman" who meets Kyle at lunch on Kyle's first day of high school. They share an interest in drawing, and L.K. helps Kyle by showing him the library and then after he sees Kyle protect Josh he thinks of him as some kind of superhero.
- Toby Neuwirth (Calum Worthy) has problems with anger management. He is in Josh's remedial English class. Toby feels insulted by being in the same class as Josh because Toby is a lot bigger than Josh.
- Wes (Brendan Penny) meets Lori when she is visiting the University of Washington with Kyle and Declan. Wes likes Lori and spends more time with her than Declan likes.
- William Kern (Bill Dow) was a science professor at the University of Washington. He taught Baylin and was later recruited by Baylin to work at Zzyzx. He was in charge of "781227".
- Dennis Bunker (Mackenzie Gray) works in personnel at Zzyzx. When Foss resigns, Bunker puts some details together that could be valuable.
- Rebecca Thatcher (Sarah-Jane Redmond) is an administrator at Zzyzx, rather than a scientist like Kern. She is Cyrus Reynolds's boss.
- Cyrus Reynolds (Andrew Jackson) is the director of security of Zzyzx. Rebecca sends him to correct a threat to their secrecy.
- Anna Manfredi (Eileen Pedde) still works at the University of Washington, where she was Kern's research assistant. She helps Kyle search for information about his connection to Kern and Baylin.
- David and Julie Peterson (Ken Tremblett and Carrie Genzel) present themselves as Kyle's birth parents at the end of the first season. "Julie" strongly resembles Kyle, and they have a full explanation of how "Noah" was abducted and lost to them for five years. When Tom Foss explains their roles, Kyle plays his role too.

== Season 2 characters ==
- Adam Baylin (J. Eddie Peck) was the creator of Zzyzx as a research facility for an experiment in artificial gestation. Kyle was cloned from him, and Kyle comes to see him as a close friend and mentor. His connection to Kyle is revealed in season two.
- Brian Taylor (Martin Cummins) grew up with Adam Baylin and remained a close friend of Adam's, despite not being entirely trusted by Adam. Brian had a competing experiment that Adam was unaware of. He is also Jessi's birth father.
- Julian Ballantine (Conrad Coates) is an executive at MadaCorp. Once he discovers that both "assets" from Zzyzx are alive, he wants both assets destroyed after the data on "781227" is retrieved from Zzyzx.
- Emily Hollander (Leah Cairns) works on secret missions for MadaCorp under Ballantine. She does what she is told, because she is also being threatened. Therefore, she pretends to be Jessi's sister.
- Paige Hollander (Nicole Leduc) is the young daughter of Emily Hollander.
- Sarah Emerson (Ally Sheedy) was Adam Baylin's college girlfriend. She contributed to the experiments at Zzyzx, but suffered emotional problems and was presumed dead after disappearing. Jessi was cloned from her. Sarah returns and she and Jessi attempt to live as mother and daughter, but Sarah disappears again and is later found to have been murdered.

== Season 3 characters ==
- Michael Cassidy (Hal Ozsan) serves as a director of Latnok. He works with a group of exceptional students doing creative science projects in a special facility, funded by Latnok, at the University of Washington. He is determined to convince Kyle to join with Latnok. Only on the very last episode does he reveal that he is Kyle's half brother.
- Nate (Jesse Hutch) is introduced to Kyle as Nathaniel Harrison, an important student working on Latnok's project at the University of Washington. He competes with Kyle for Amanda.
- Jackie (Ali Liebert) is another student working in the University of Washington's Latnok project. She is the first student in this project that Kyle meets. She meets Declan at their club party and they appear to have chemistry.
