= April Matson =

American actress and singer

- Occupation(s): Actress, singer
- Years active: 2003–present
- Spouse: Scott Grady (m. 2018)

April Matson is an American actress and singer. She is known for her portrayal of Lori Trager on the ABC Family cable television network series Kyle XY. She was also featured on the Fox network television series Quintuplets alongside Andy Richter, and in the 2005 film short Forsaken.

Matson has performed in numerous theatrical productions, a rejected pilot for MTV and several independent films. In 2003, Matson made a guest appearance on American Dreams.

She is also a singer, and had two songs featured in episodes of Kyle XY. The first song is called "Will You Remember Me (Lori's Song)" and was played in the season two episode "Does Kyle Dream of Electric Fish?". A non-acoustic version of this song is available on the Kyle XY soundtrack album. The other song is called "Right In Front Of Me," which was featured in the season two finale, "I've Had the Time of My Life." Matson released a debut album called Pieces of My Heart.

Matson recently played April Johnson on the Idaho-based web series The Gratitude Clan and Crystal in the 2015 mystery-thriller Primrose Lane.

Currently living in Idaho, she founded PLATFORM, a company designed for creative individuals to collaborate on ideas, in December 2015. She's also the office manager for AnchorPoint Accounting, according to her LinkedIn page.

== Discography ==
Kyle XY Soundtrack- released May 22, 2007
14. Will You Remember Me (Lori's Song) (3:04)

Pieces of My Heart- EP- released May 10, 2008 on Myspace, released July 9, 2008 on iTunes
1. Pieces of My Heart (3:47)
2. Don't Crucify Me (3:41)
3. 99 Miles To San Francisco (Featuring The Brandon James) (3:22)
4. I Don't Want To Be Strong (2:44)
5. Dear Jeanine (3:23)

== Filmography ==
=== Television ===
Year	Title	Role	Notes
2004–05	Quintuplets	Penny Chase	Main cast, 22 episodes
2006	NCIS	Carolyn	Episode: "Twisted Sister"
2006–09	Kyle XY	Lori Trager	Main cast, 43 episodes
2010	Psych	Carol	Episode: "In Plain Fright"
2016	The Gratitude Clan	April Johnson	3 episodes

=== Films ===
Year	Title	Role
2005	Forsaken (short)	Judith
2006	God's Little Monster (short)	Goth
2009	Black Russian	Sunny
2010	The Latin & The Gringo	Big Red
2011	Vile	Tayler
2015	Primrose Lane	Crystal
