= Hurlbut Memorial Gate =

- U.S. National Register of Historic Places
- Michigan State Historic Site
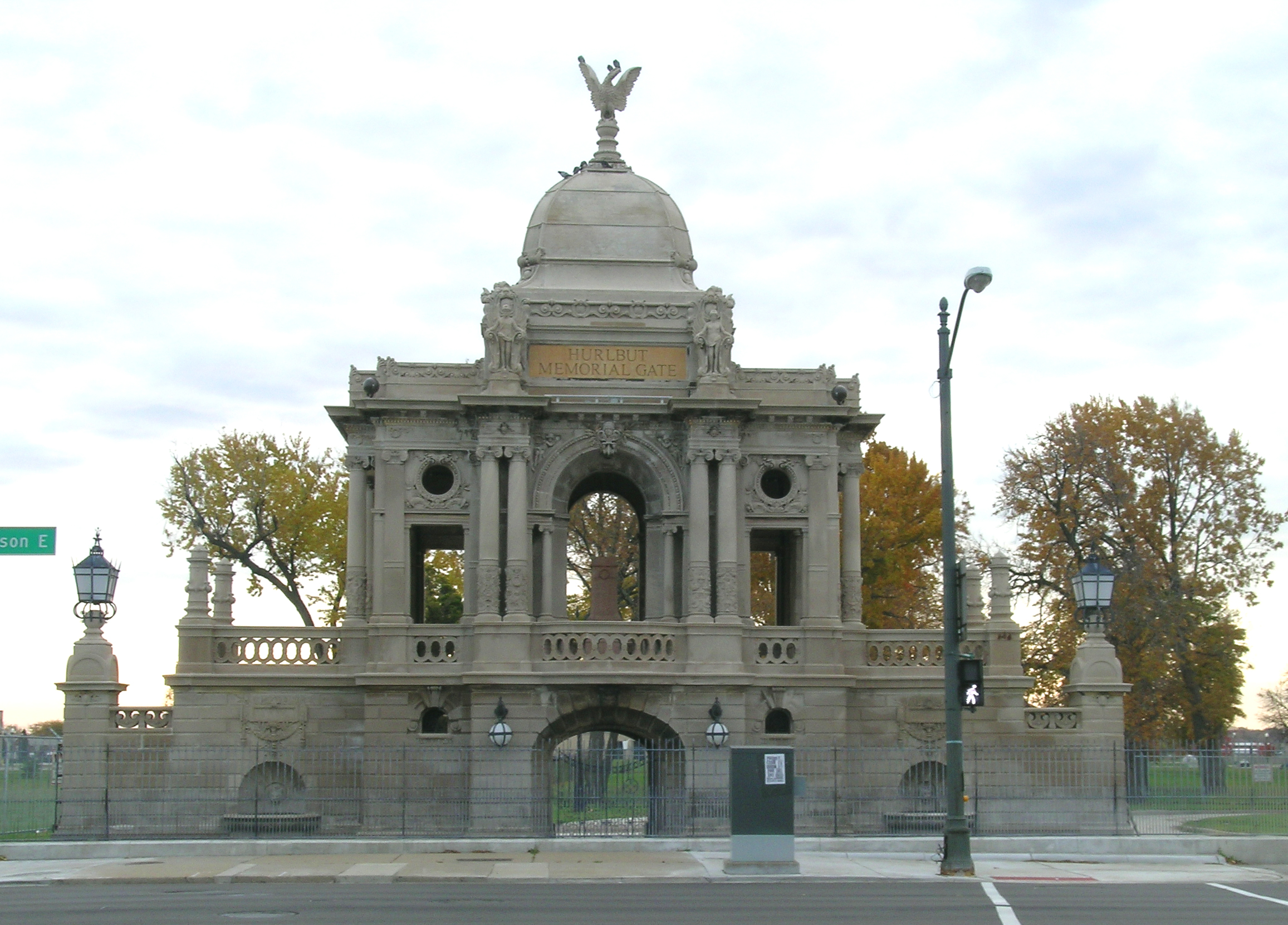
- Interactive map
- Location: East Jefferson Avenue at Cadillac Boulevard; Detroit, Michigan
- Coordinates: 42°21′39″N 82°58′53″W
- Built: 1894, restored in 2007
- Architect: Brede & Mueller
- Architectural style: Beaux-Arts
- NRHP reference No.: 75000967

Significant dates
- Added to NRHP: March 27, 1975
- Designated MSHS: July 26, 1974

Hurlbut Memorial Gate is a monumental structure, 132 ft (40 m) long, 50 ft (15 m) high, and 40 ft (12 m) in depth, at the entry way to Water Works Park located at East Jefferson Avenue and Cadillac Boulevard in a historic area of Detroit, Michigan. It is named after Chauncey (sometimes "Chauncy") Hurlbut, a 19th-century Detroit grocer, president of the Board of Water Commissioners, and philanthropist. The gate was designated a Michigan State Historic Site in 1974 and listed on the National Register of Historic Places in 1975. The monument was built in 1894 and fully restored in 2007.

== History ==
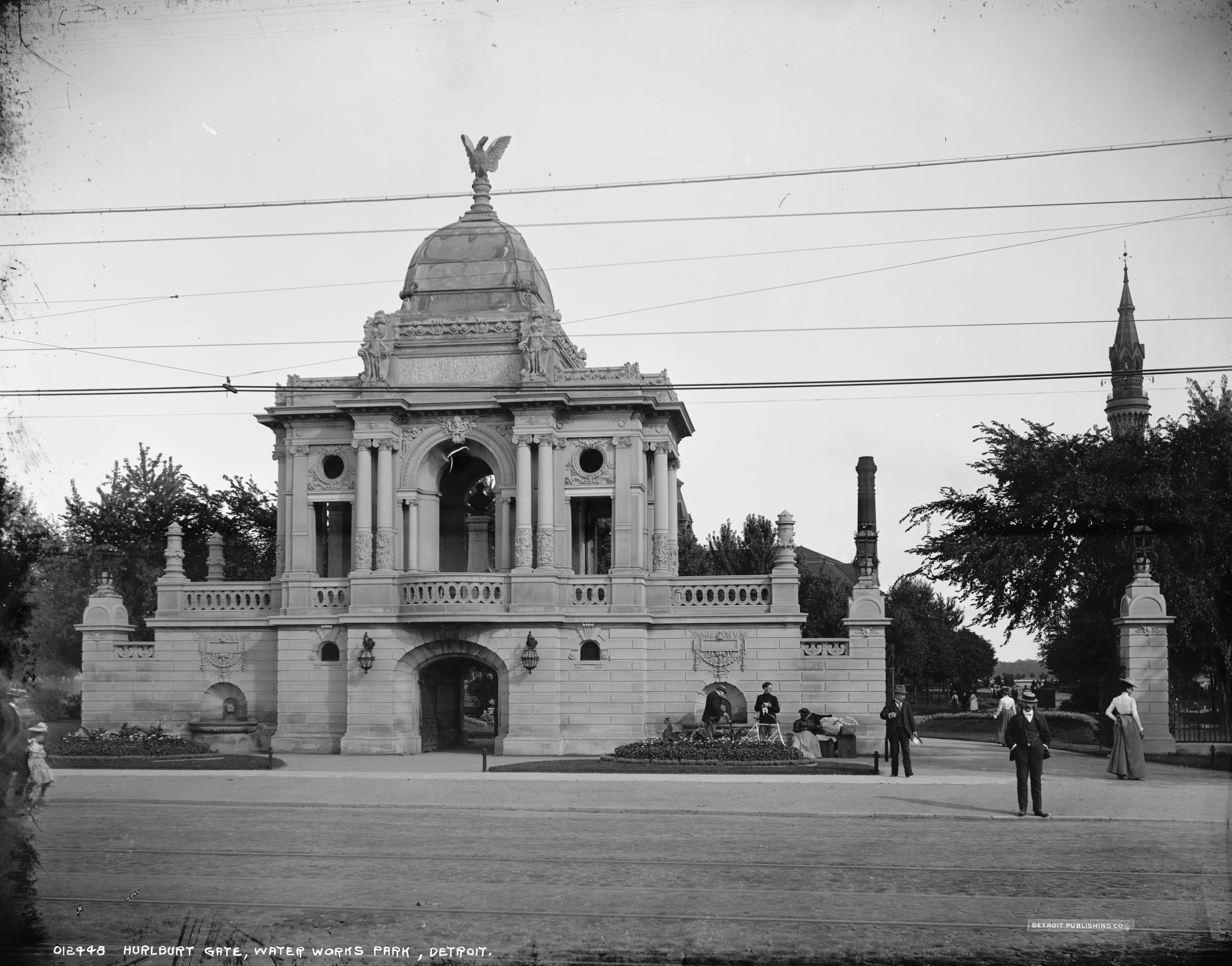
Hurlbut Gate, c. 1895

The city of Detroit began building its water system as early as 1824, with the construction of a waterworks at the foot of Orleans. The prosperity of the city in the time after the American Civil War allowed Detroit to develop a municipal water system, using water from the Detroit River.

In 1868, the city began developing Water Works Park, on Jefferson Avenue near at the foot of Cadillac Boulevard. The main function of the site was to provide water to the municipal system, but it was also intended that the grounds be used as a public park. By 1879, the pumping station was completed, and by 1900, the 110-acre (0.45 km^{2}) park had become the second most-used park in the city. Early French settlers planted twelve missionary pear trees "named for the twelve Apostles" on the grounds of what became Water Works Park.

Water Works Park was named Gladwin Park in 1910 in honor of Major Henry Gladwin during Siege of Fort Detroit from Pontiac's Rebellion. In 1951 the park was closed with no more public access. It reopened as a much smaller part in 1957 but would close again a few years later.

== Chauncey Hurlbut ==
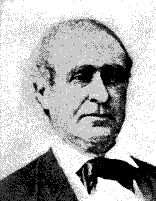
Chauncey Hurlbut

Chauncey Hurlbut (1803–1885) was born in Oneida, New York, and moved to Detroit in 1825. He worked as a saddler and harnessmaker for a few years, then went into the grocery business with his brother-in-law. In 1837, Hurlbut bought out the grocery store, and continued in the trade until his death. Hurlbut was also heavily involved in public service, serving on the board of the fire department, as a city alderman, as a director of the Detroit Board of Trade, and as a sewer commissioner. Hurlbut also served on the Detroit Board of Water Commissioners from 1861 to 1863, and again from 1868 to 1885. He was president of the commission from 1871 onward, when he presided over the original acquisition of property for and planning of Water Works Park.

When Chauncey Hurlbut died in 1885, he willed the bulk of his fortune, some $250,000, to beautify Water Works Park. The architectural philosophies of the era called for construction of monumental gates at the entrances to public places, to symbolically separate the park from the hustle and filth of the city. Part of Hurlbut's fortune was used to construct just such a gate.

== Description ==
Herman A. Brede and Gustave Mueller were chosen to design this gate at a cost of $30,000. The structure is a three tiered triumphal arch, 132 feet (40 m) in length, 40 feet (12 m) in depth, and over 50 feet (15 m) high, built from limestone. It is decorated with carved garlands, water fonts and roundels, and an American eagle with outstretched wings tops the entire structure. Two stairways lead to a terrace twelve feet above the ground.

The gate originally featured a statue of Chauncey Hurlbut inside the center dome, and an ornamental iron gate for vehicle entry, but both are now gone. The gate was substantially restored in 2007, with damaged limestone repaired or replaced, a stairway reconfiguration, repair of the eagle sculpture, and repair and replacement of light fixtures.
