= Gustav Müller =

Gustav Müller may refer to:

- Gustav Müller (astronomer) (1851–1925), German astronomer
- Gustav Müller (politician) (1860–1921), Swiss politician
- Gustav Müller (serial killer) (1865–?), German bigamist, murderer and serial killer
- Gustav Wilhelm Müller (1857–1940), German zoologist
- Gustl Müller (1903–1989), German Nordic combined and cross-country skier

== See also ==
- Gustave Mueller (disambiguation)
