= DeMarco Murray =

American football player and coach (born 1988)

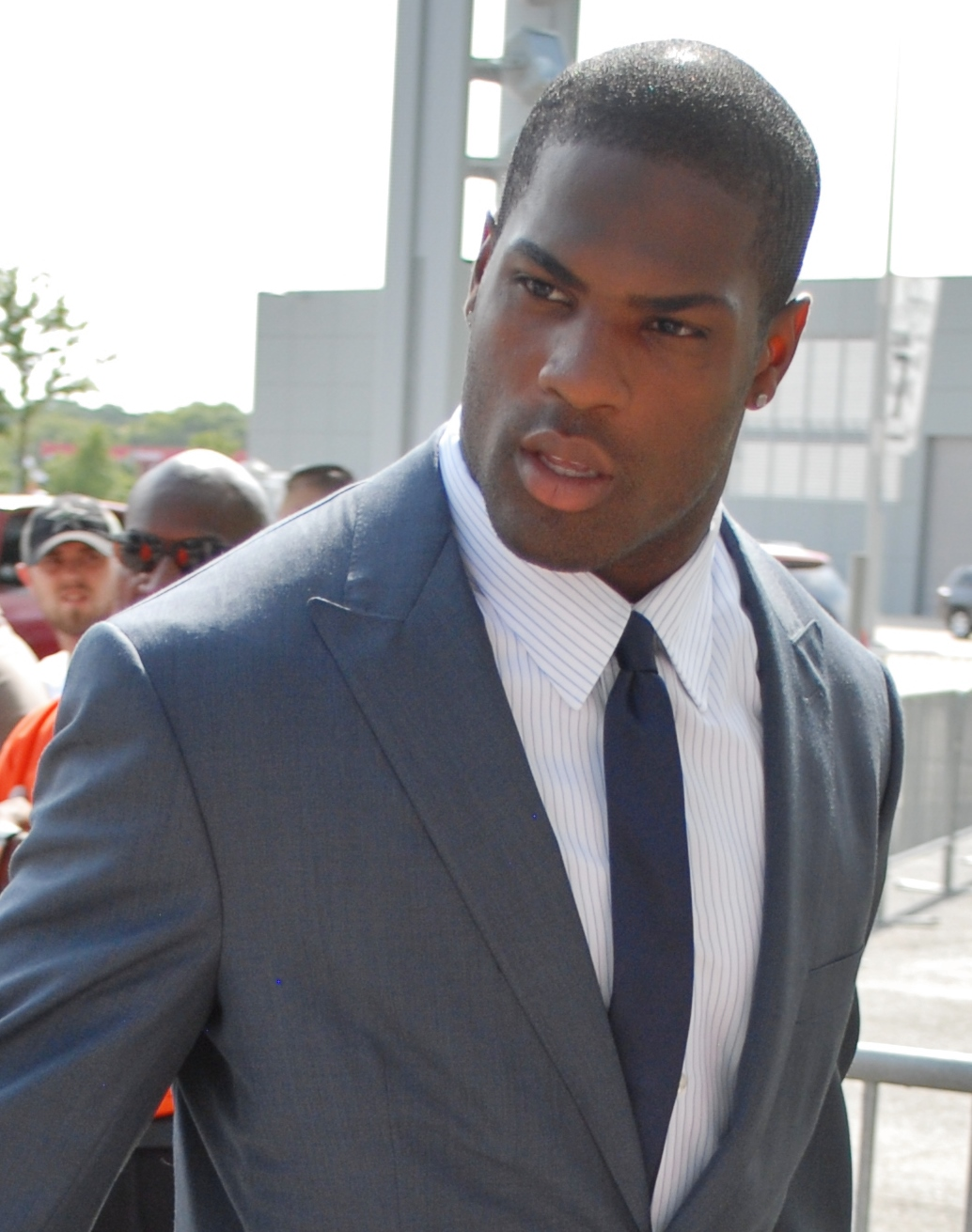
- Murray in 2012

Kansas City Chiefs
- Title: Running backs coach

Personal information
- Born: February 12, 1988 (age 38); Las Vegas, Nevada, U.S.
- Listed height: 6 ft 1 in (1.85 m)
- Listed weight: 220 lb (100 kg)

Career information
- Position: Running back (No. 29)
- High school: Bishop Gorman (Las Vegas)
- College: Oklahoma (2006–2010)
- NFL draft: 2011: 3rd round, 71st overall pick

Career history

Playing
- Dallas Cowboys (2011–2014); Philadelphia Eagles (2015); Tennessee Titans (2016–2017)

Coaching
- Arizona (2019) Running backs coach; Oklahoma (2020–2025) Running backs coach; Kansas City Chiefs (2026–present) Running backs coach

Awards and highlights
- NFL Offensive Player of the Year (2014); First-team All-Pro (2014); 3× Pro Bowl (2013, 2014, 2016); NFL rushing yards leader (2014); NFL rushing touchdowns co-leader (2014); PFWA All-Rookie Team (2011); 2× First-team All-Big 12 (2008, 2010); Second-team All-Big 12 (2009)

Career NFL statistics
- Rushing yards: 7,174
- Rushing average: 4.5
- Rushing touchdowns: 49
- Receptions: 307
- Receiving yards: 2,165
- Receiving touchdowns: 6
- Stats at Pro Football Reference

DeMarco Murray (born February 12, 1988) is an American football coach and former professional player who is currently the running backs coach for the Kansas City Chiefs of the National Football League (NFL). A running back in the National Football League (NFL) for seven seasons, Murray was a three-time Pro Bowl selection, one-time first-team All-Pro, and NFL Offensive Player of the Year in 2014 after leading the NFL in both rushing yards and rushing touchdowns.

Murray played college football at Oklahoma and was selected by the Dallas Cowboys in the third round of the 2011 NFL draft. After four seasons with the Cowboys, he played for the Philadelphia Eagles for one year and then the Tennessee Titans for two years.

== Early life ==
Murray attended Bishop Gorman High School in Las Vegas, Nevada, where he played football, basketball, and ran track for the Gaels athletic teams. In football, Murray was an All-Conference pick three consecutive years. During his time at Gorman, the team was three-time Conference Champions. As a senior in 2005, Murray rushed for 1,947 yards and 27 touchdowns and also caught 22 passes for 624 yards and seven more touchdowns, earning All-State honors and the 2005 Sunset Region Offensive Player of the Year award. He also played basketball at Gorman, averaging 6.9 points per game and his high school basketball team went on to win a 2005 state title. Murray was considered a top-30 basketball recruit in the state as well. In track & field, he ran the 100-meter dash and was a member of the 4×100-meter relay squad.

Considered one of the top running backs of his class, Murray drew offers from Miami (FL), Penn State, and Texas A&M, among several others. He chose Oklahoma over Southern California at the 2006 U.S. Army All-American Bowl.

== College career ==
Murray attended and played college football for the Oklahoma Sooners from 2006 to 2010.

=== 2006–2007 seasons ===
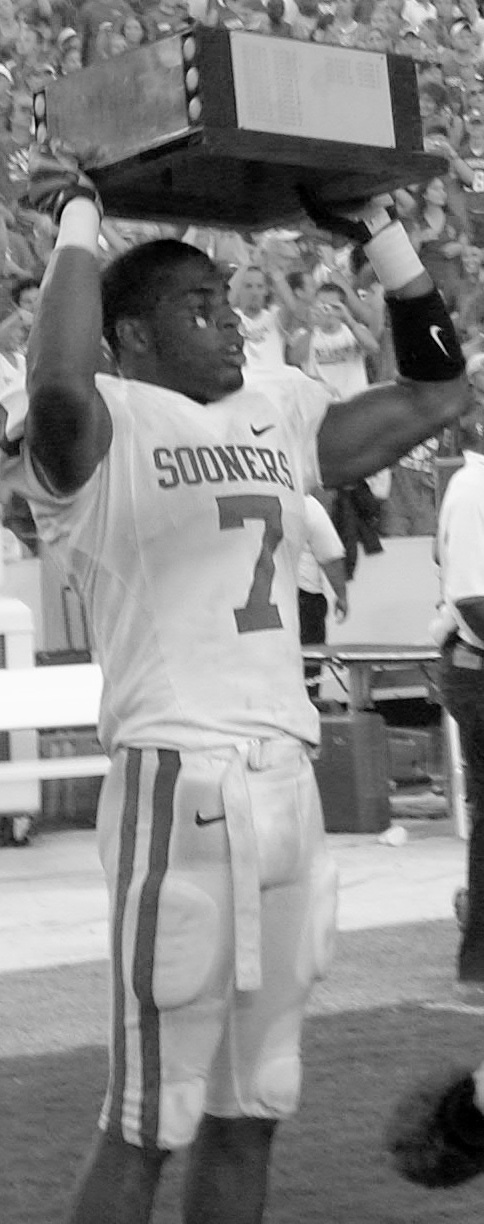
Murray in 2007

Murray redshirted the 2006 NCAA football season. In the 2007 season, he shared the backfield with Allen Patrick and Chris Brown. In his first game for the Oklahoma Sooners on September 1, 2007, against the North Texas Mean Green, Murray rushed for 87 yards and five touchdowns in the 79–10 victory. He became the first player in school history to score four touchdowns in a half in his debut. On September 15, in the 54–3 victory over Utah State, Murray set a Sooner record when he had a touchdown run of 92 yards, which is the third longest in Oklahoma football history. In a game against Tulsa, he added two more rushing touchdowns and a kick return touchdown in the 62–21 victory. In the annual rivalry game against #19 Texas, Murray finished with 128 rushing yards, of which 65 yards came on a touchdown run in the third quarter of the 28–21 victory. On November 10 against Baylor, he rushed for 95 yards and three touchdowns while also recording a kick return touchdown in the 52–21 victory. Overall, Murray finished the 2007 season with 127 carries for 764 yards and tied Adrian Peterson's freshman touchdown record with 15. He logged a 4.40 (team best) 40 time and a 36.5-inch vertical jump during the 2007 winter testing.

=== 2008 season ===
In the 2008 season, Murray continued to share the backfield with Chris Brown while newcomer Mossis Madu got some carries as well. Murray started off the 2008 season with 124 yards and two touchdowns in the 57–2 victory over the Chattanooga Mocs. On September 12 against Washington, he rushed for 100 yards in the 55–14 victory. On October 4 against Baylor, Murray ran for 96 yards and two touchdowns in the 49–17 victory. Two weeks later against #16 Kansas, he ran for 83 yards and two touchdowns in the 45–31 victory. In the next game against Kansas State, Murray had 17 carries for 104 yards and two touchdowns to go along with four receptions for 63 yards and two touchdowns during the 58–35 victory. The following week against Nebraska, he added two more rushing touchdowns and another receiving touchdown to his season total in the 62–28 victory. During a 66–28 victory over Texas A&M, Murray had seven carries for 123 yards and seven receptions for 63 yards and a touchdown. On November 22, he rushed for 125 yards and two touchdowns in a 65–21 victory over #2 Texas Tech. In the annual rivalry game against #11 Oklahoma State, Murray rushed for 73 yards and a touchdown and had seven kick returns for 196 net yards in the 61–41 victory. However, Murray tore his hamstring in the Big 12 Championship on the opening kickoff against Missouri, which left him out of the National Championship against Florida.

Murray finished the 2008 season with 179 carries for 1,002 yards and 14 touchdowns to go along with 31 receptions for 395 yards and four touchdowns.

=== 2009 season ===
In the 2009 season, the backfield was largely dominated by the duo of Murray and Chris Brown. In the second game of the Sooners' 2009 season, Murray rushed for 101 yards and two touchdowns in the 64–0 victory over Idaho State. On October 10 against Baylor, he had 24 carries for 107 yards in the 33–7 victory. In the next game against #3 Texas, Murray had eight receptions for 116 yards during the 16–13 loss. The following week, he had 15 carries for 62 yards and two touchdowns to go along with four receptions for 28 yards and a touchdown in the 42–30 victory over Kansas State. On November 14, against Texas A&M, Murray had a stellar performance with 80 rushing yards to go along with five receptions for 140 yards and two touchdowns in the 65–10 victory. On November 28 against #11 Oklahoma State, he rushed for 72 yards and two touchdowns in the 27–0 victory. In the 2009 Sun Bowl against #19 Stanford, Murray had 20 carries for 27 yards and the final go-ahead touchdown during the 31–27 victory.

Murray finished the 2009 season with 171 carries for 705 yards and eight touchdowns to go along with 41 receptions for 522 yards and four touchdowns.

=== 2010 season ===
Murray dominated the Sooners' backfield in his final year with the program. Murray started the season off with a strong performance of 208 rushing yards and two touchdowns against Utah State in the 31–24 victory. In the next game against #17 Florida State, he rushed for 51 yards and two touchdowns in the 47–17 victory. The following week against Air Force, Murray ran for 110 yards and his third consecutive game with two rushing touchdowns in the 27–24 victory. He also had five receptions for 38 yards and a touchdown. After posting 67 rushing yards and a touchdown against Cincinnati in the narrow 31–29 victory, Murray had 115 rushing yards and two touchdowns during the 28–20 victory over #21 Texas. On October 16, 2010, with 112 rushing yards and two touchdowns against Iowa State in the 52–0 shutout victory, Murray passed running back Steve Owens as the all-time touchdown leader at the University of Oklahoma with 58 touchdowns. On November 20 against Baylor, Murray ran for 62 yards and a touchdown and caught six passes for 120 yards and a touchdown in the 53–24 victory. In his final collegiate game, Murray had 93 rushing yards and a touchdown against #25 Connecticut during the 48–20 victory in the 2011 Fiesta Bowl.

Murray finished his last season with the Sooners with 282 carries for 1,214 yards and 15 touchdowns to go along with 71 receptions for 594 yards and five touchdowns. He ended his college career with 65 touchdowns, becoming only the fifth player in Big 12 conference history to score at least 60 career touchdowns.

Murray had 3,685 career rushing yards (4.86 average) with 50 touchdowns, 157 career catches with 13 touchdowns, and 1,462 kickoff return yards with two touchdowns. He was a four-time Academic All-Big 12 honoree during his career and graduated from Oklahoma with a degree in communication and a double minor in business and African American studies.

== Professional career ==
Pre-draft measurables
Height	Weight	Arm length	Hand span	Wingspan	40-yard dash	10-yard split	20-yard split	20-yard shuttle	Three-cone drill	Vertical jump	Broad jump	Bench press
5 ft 11 5/8 in (1.82 m)	213 lb (97 kg)	32 in (0.81 m)	9 1/4 in (0.23 m)	6 ft 5 in (1.96 m)	4.43 s	1.55 s	2.60 s	4.18 s	7.28 s	34.5 in (0.88 m)	10 ft 4 in (3.15 m)	21 reps
All values from NFL Combine

=== Dallas Cowboys ===
==== 2011 season ====
Murray was selected in the third round (71st overall) of the 2011 NFL draft by the Dallas Cowboys. He was the sixth running back chosen in the draft.

On July 29, 2011, Murray signed a four-year contract worth $2.97 million including a signing bonus worth $622,000.

Murray started his rookie year as the third string running back behind starter Felix Jones and second string running back Tashard Choice. From Weeks 1 to 4, Murray had 14 carries for 39 yards (2.78 average) and added three receptions for 16 yards. On October 16, the Cowboys traveled to Gillette Stadium to face the New England Patriots. Felix Jones went down with a high-ankle sprain, which increased the amount of opportunities for Murray. Murray finished the day with 11 carries for 34 yards and added one reception for seven yards in the 20–16 loss.

With the Cowboys owning a record of 2–3, they faced the St. Louis Rams in Week 7. Felix Jones was declared out for the game due to his ankle injury, so the team declared Tashard Choice as the starter and Murray as the second-string running back. Murray had 25 carries for 253 yards and a touchdown during the 34–7 victory, breaking Emmitt Smith's single-game rushing record for a Cowboys running back of 237 yards set at Philadelphia against the Eagles on October 31, 1993. The record total included a first quarter 91-yard touchdown run that was the longest rush of the 2011 season and was second-longest in Cowboys history, after an NFL-record 99-yard run by Tony Dorsett in January 1983. Among the other records Murray set during this game were a rookie rushing record for a game in franchise history, previously held by Dorsett with 206 yards in 1977. Murray’s 10.1 yards-per-carry is the highest rushing average with 20-or-more attempts for a game in club history, previously held by Dorsett with 8.96 in 1977, the tenth most rushing yards in a game in league history, the second-most rushing yards in a game by a rookie in league history, the second-longest touchdown run on a player's first career rushing touchdown in league history, and the most rushing yards by a running back in one game ever allowed by the Rams in franchise history. Murray earned the Rookie of the Week award and FedEx Ground NFL Player of the Week for his game against the Rams. After the Rams game, Tashard Choice was released leaving the team with only two healthy running backs, rookie Phillip Tanner and Murray, with Felix Jones still sidelined with an injury. Murray's historic day ended up being the most rushing yards by a single player in any game in the 2011 season.

Murray followed his record-breaking game by getting his first NFL start against the Philadelphia Eagles in Week 8. In Weeks 8 and 9, Murray totaled 30 carries for 213 yards for a 7.1 average and five receptions for 45 yards in a 34–7 road loss to the Eagles and a 23–13 victory over the Seattle Seahawks. With his second game with at least 100 rushing yards of the season, Murray became the first Cowboy since Julius Jones in 2004 to post multiple games with at least 100 rushing yards as a rookie. With 466 rushing yards over the last three games, Murray tied Eric Dickerson for the fifth-highest total all-time by an NFL rookie during a three-game span. The record is 577 set by Mike Anderson of the Denver Broncos in 2000. The 466 rushing yards in the three game span is the most ever by any Cowboys player, surpassing 446 yards by Emmitt Smith during his MVP season of 1993.

From Weeks 10 to 13, Murray had 79 carries for 333 yards and a touchdown for a 4.21 average and added 16 receptions for 109 yards as the Cowboys went 3–1 during this stretch. During Week 10 against the Buffalo Bills, he fumbled the ball for the first time in his NFL career, although the fumble was recovered by Murray himself. During Week 14 against the New York Giants, Murray carried the ball five times for 25 yards and added a reception for six yards before suffering a fractured right ankle and high ankle sprain that prematurely ended his rookie season. Murray was named NFL Rookie of the Month for the month of November.

At the end of the 2011 season, Murray led all NFL rookie players (with 40 or more carries) in average per carry (5.5 per carry), yards per game (69.0 yards), and rushing yards (897 yards) on 164 carries (second-most among rookie players, Daniel Thomas had 165 carries). Murray tied for third among rookie players for rushing touchdowns with two; Carolina Panthers' quarterback and 2011 Rookie of the Year Cam Newton led all rookie players with 14 rushing touchdowns. Murray also was 14th in receptions among all rookie players and second among rookie running backs with 26 receptions. He finished fourth in receiving yards among rookie running backs with 183. Among all NFL running backs, Murray with seven starts in 12 games, tied for the second-highest average per carry for a running back with 80 or more carries trailing only Darren Sproles' 6.9 yards per carry on 63 attempts. Murray's 897 rushing yards ranked 22nd among all NFL running backs and ninth in the NFC. The Cowboys went 5–0 for the season when Murray received 20+ touches in the game and 2–5 when he did not. In the five games where Murray got 20 or more touches, starting quarterback Tony Romo averaged a passer rating of 112.10, 246.6 yards per game, along with 12 combined touchdown passes with two interceptions and a 66.99% pass completion rate.

==== 2012 season ====
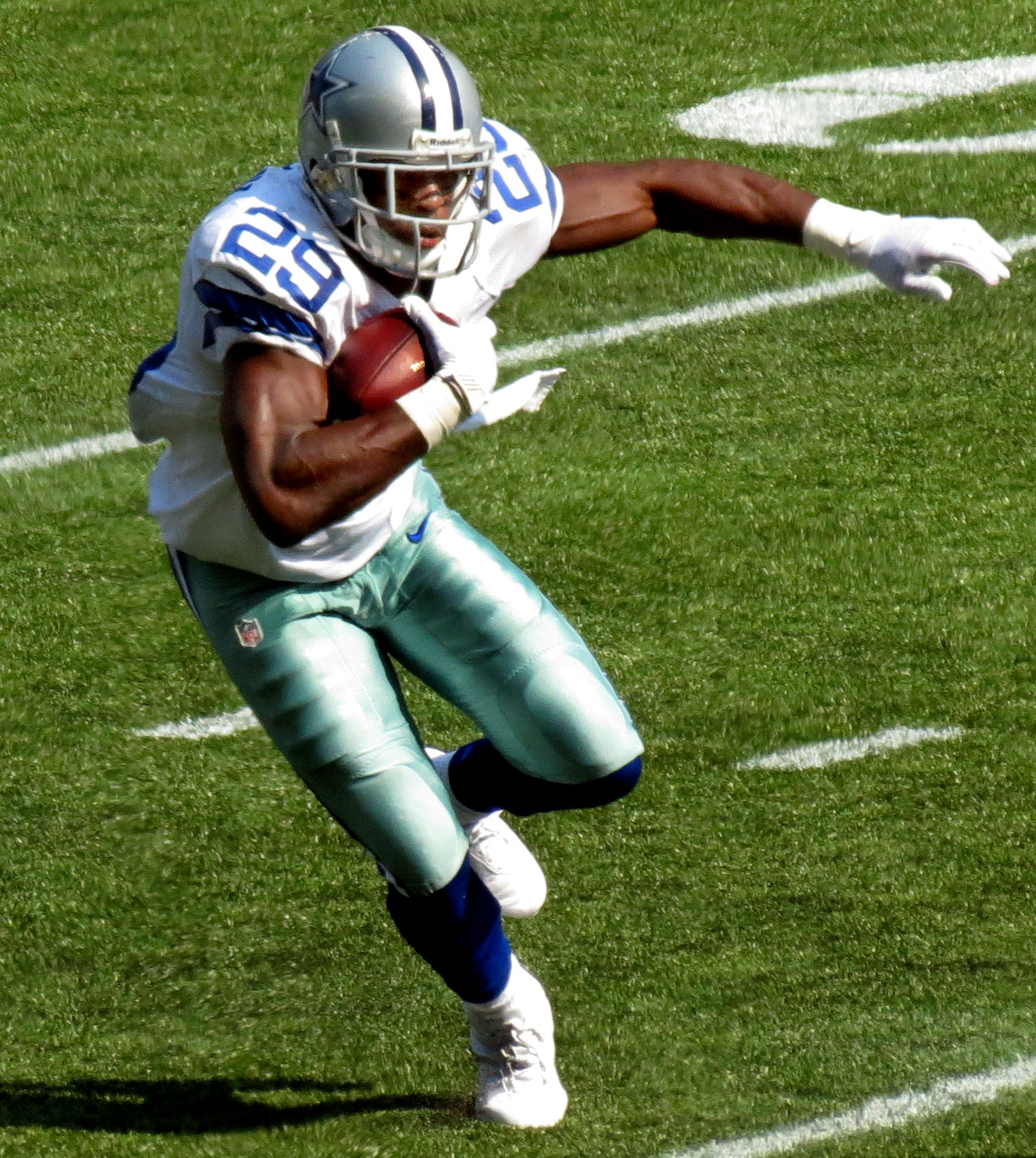
Murray in 2012

Murray started the season off strong with 20 carries for 131 yards in a 24–17 road victory over the Giants. Over the next three games, he had 41 carries for 106 yards and a touchdown to go along with 14 receptions for 105 yards. During a narrow Week 6 31–29 road loss to the Baltimore Ravens, Murray had 14 carries for 93 yards before suffering a sprained foot. He missed six games as a result of the injury. After returning from his injury, Murray rushed for 83 yards and a touchdown on 23 carries during a Week 13 38–33 victory over the Eagles. In the next game against the Cincinnati Bengals, he recorded his third touchdown of the year while rushing for 53 yards on 21 attempts in the 20–19 road victory. This marked the eighth straight game where the Cowboys have won with Murray rushing the ball 20 or more times as the starting running back.

Despite missing six games, Murray finished his second professional season with 161 carries for 663 yards and four touchdowns to go along with 35 receptions for 251 yards.

==== 2013 season ====
During a Week 3 31–7 victory over the Rams, Murray recorded a season-high 175 yards on 26 carries and three receptions for 28 yards. This marked the second time in as many games that he ran for over 175 yards against the Rams. Three weeks later against the Washington Redskins, Murray suffered a sprained MCL and missed the next two games. Rookie Joseph Randle took Murray's place because second-string running back Lance Dunbar was also battling an injury of his own.

Returning from injury in Week 9, Murray was limited with four carries for 31 yards as the Dallas coaching staff abandoned the running game with 51 passing plays to 10 rushing plays in a 27–23 victory over the Minnesota Vikings. Although he did not have many opportunities in this game, Murray would improve as 61% of his rushing yards came from the second half of the season. During a Week 13 31–24 victory over the Oakland Raiders, he ran for 63 yards and a career-high three touchdowns. Three weeks later against the Redskins, Murray scored a 10-yard receiving touchdown from Tony Romo late in the fourth quarter to help give the Cowboys the game-winning points in the narrow 24–23 victory.

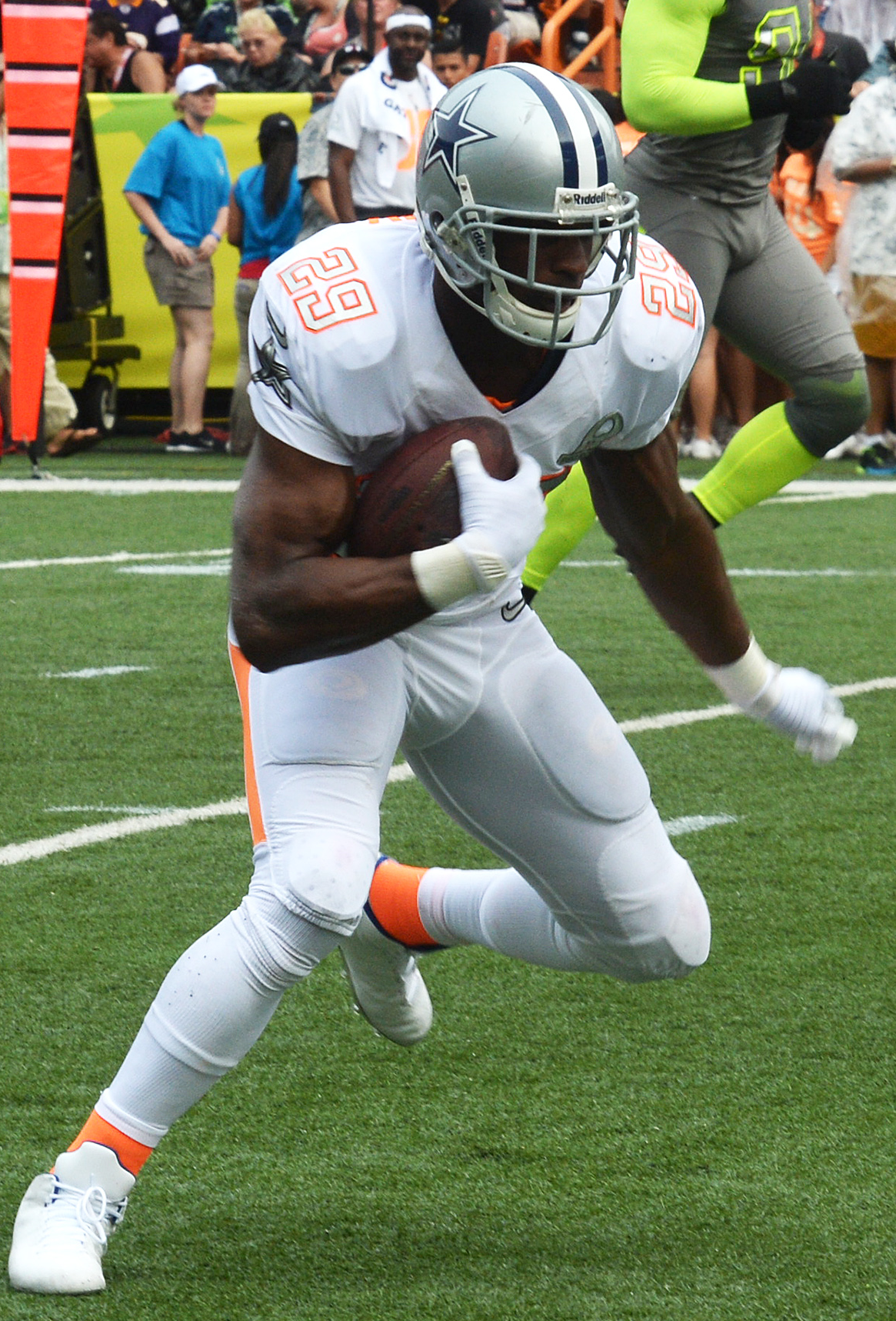
Murray in action during the 2014 Pro Bowl

After the final game of the season, Murray was fined $21,000 for violating the crown-of-the-helmet rule on a collision with Philadelphia Eagles' defensive lineman Damion Square.

Murray finished the 2013 season ranked 11th in total yards from scrimmage with 1,471 while missing two games due to injury. He had 217 carries for 1,121 yards and nine touchdowns, all career highs and ranking tied for 17th, tenth, and tied for sixth, respectively among running backs. Murray's 5.2 yards per attempt was the most in the league among players with 150 or more attempts. He also recorded 53 catches for 350 yards and a touchdown, ranking 11th, 14th, and tied for 16th among running backs.

Murray replaced Frank Gore in the 2014 Pro Bowl after Gore got injured during the NFC Championship Game against the Seahawks. This marked Murray's first Pro Bowl nomination. He had four carries for 25 yards and caught four passes for 37 yards as he scored the eventual game-winning touchdown on a 20-yard reception from quarterback Alex Smith to give Team Rice a narrow 22–21 victory. Murray was ranked 87th by his fellow players on the NFL Top 100 Players of 2014.

==== 2014 season: Rushing title ====
In 2014, Murray and an improved offensive line helped the team find a new identity. In the first eight games, Murray broke Jim Brown's 1958 NFL rushing record for most consecutive 100-yard games to start a season. Given his previous injury history, the team considered limiting some of Murray's workloads, but he was such an integral part of the offense success, that the Cowboys could not cut back on his playing time.

Murray had 22 carries for 118 yards and a touchdown during the season-opening 28–17 loss to the San Francisco 49ers. He followed that up 29 carries for 167 yards and a touchdown during a 26–10 road victory over the Tennessee Titans in the next game. The following week against the Rams, Murray rushed for 100 yards and a touchdown on 24 carries in the 34–31 road victory.

During a Week 4 38–17 victory over the New Orleans Saints, Murray rushed 24 times for 149 yards and two touchdowns for his fourth straight game finding the endzone. In the next game against the Houston Texans, Murray had a season-high 31 carries for 136 yards during the 20–17 victory. The following week against the defending Super Bowl XLVIII champion Seahawks, he ran for 115 yards and a touchdown on 28 carries in the 30–23 road victory.

During a Week 7 31–21 victory over the Giants, Murray rushed for 128 yards and a touchdown on 28 carries. In the next game, the Cowboys' win streak ended as the Redskins defeated them 20–17. In the loss, Murray recorded 19 carries for 141 yards and four receptions for 80 yards. The following week against to the Arizona Cardinals, he had 19 carries for 79 yards in the 28–17 loss, being held to under 100 rushing yards for the first time in the 2014 season. In the next three games, Murray bounced back with 100 yards in a Week 10 31–17 victory over the Jacksonville Jaguars at Wembley Stadium in London, 121 yards during a 31–28 road victory over the Giants two weeks later, and 73 yards and a touchdown in a 33–10 loss to the Eagles in Week 13.

During a Week 14 41–28 road victory over the Chicago Bears, Murray had a season-high 32 carries for 179 yards and a touchdown. In the next game against the Eagles, he suffered a broken left hand that required surgery the following day. Heavily bandaged, Murray did not miss any time and played the following week against the Indianapolis Colts and had 22 carries for 58 yards in the 42–7 victory. During the regular-season finale with his hand still bandaged, Murray rushed 20 times for 100 yards in a 44–17 road victory over the Redskins to pass Emmitt Smith's franchise single-season rushing record.

Murray finished the 2014 season with 392 carries for 1,845 yards and 13 touchdowns to go along with 57 receptions for 416 yards. The Cowboys finished atop the NFC East with a 12–4 record. During the Wild Card Round against the Detroit Lions, Murray had 19 carries for 75 yards and a touchdown to go along with three receptions for 22 yards in the 24–20 victory. In the Divisional Round against the Green Bay Packers, he had 25 carries for 123 yards and a touchdown during the controversial 26–21 road loss. Murray earned the NFL's Offensive Player of The Year award at the end of the season. He also finished tied with his quarterback Tony Romo for third place in MVP voting.

Murray set the franchise single season rushing record with 12 games rushing for at least 100 yards and passed Walt Garrison for seventh on the Cowboys all-time rushing yards list. Murray finished the season as the league's top rusher and was named as a First-team All-Pro and to his second Pro Bowl while having his second straight 1,000 yard season. Murray was ranked fourth by his fellow players on the NFL Top 100 Players of 2015 list.

=== Philadelphia Eagles ===
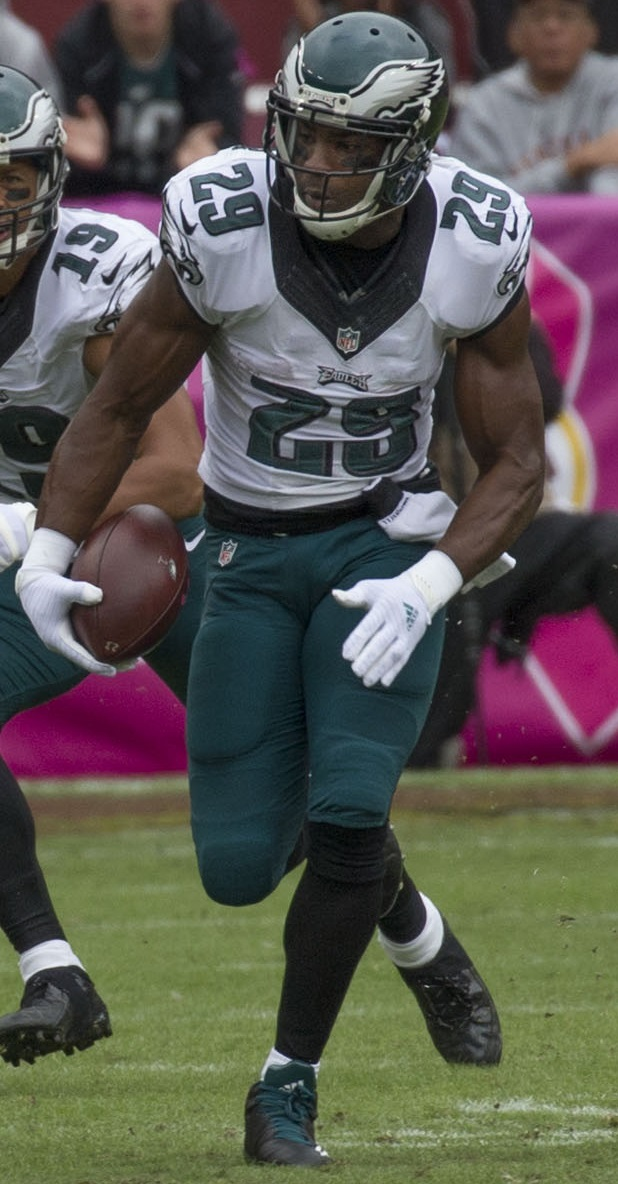
Murray in 2015

On March 9, 2015, it was reported in the media that Frank Gore had agreed in principle to a contract with the Philadelphia Eagles to replace LeSean McCoy, who was recently traded to the Buffalo Bills. However, the following day, Gore had second thoughts and signed with the Indianapolis Colts instead.

Following this setback, the team reached an agreement with Ryan Mathews for a three-year deal. However, the Eagles quickly turned their attention into signing Murray, who was still available in free agency. On March 12, Murray agreed to a five-year, $42 million contract, joining former college teammate quarterback Sam Bradford.

In his first game with the Eagles, Murray had only eight carries for nine yards. However, he scored two touchdowns, an eight-yard run and a five-yard reception, during the narrow 26–24 road loss to the Atlanta Falcons on Monday Night Football. The team received criticism due to his sparse usage. In the next game against his former team, the Dallas Cowboys, Murray was held up again, rushing for only two yards on 13 carries and catching five passes for 53 yards during the 20–10 loss. Murray's Week 2 performance marked the fewest rushing yards through the first two games for a defending rushing champion since Doug Russell of the Chicago Cardinals in 1936. Murray missed the Week 3 matchup against the New York Jets due to a hamstring injury, while Mathews ran for 108 yards and Darren Sproles scored two touchdowns. Despite Mathews' success, Murray was named the starter for a Week 4 divisional matchup against the Redskins. He had a 30-yard run in the first quarter, but finished the 23–20 road loss with eight carries for 36 yards. During a Week 6 27–7 victory over the Giants, Murray rushed for 112 yards and a touchdown on 21 carries, which turned out to be his only 100-yard game of the season.

As the season progressed, Murray grew increasingly frustrated with the offensive line not generating the running lanes needed, resulting in him being required to frequently run laterally instead of downhill and not being seen as a good fit in the team's offensive system, which always ran in the shotgun.

During a Week 13 35–28 road victory over the Patriots, Murray was demoted because the team decided the smaller, quicker Darren Sproles would be more effective. Murray registered eight carries for 24 yards in the game, while Sproles recorded 66 yards on 15 carries, and 34 yards on four receptions. Murray reportedly had a conversation with owner Jeffrey Lurie over his role in the offense during the flight back to Philadelphia. Murray struggled to get touches after the return of Ryan Mathews, who started the remaining four games. Murray finished third on the team in rushing in the next two games, behind Sproles and Mathews, posting only eight snaps with two rushing attempts in a 40–17 loss to the Cardinals for three yards. He led the team in carries and rushes during a Week 16 38–24 loss to the Redskins with five carries for 27 yards and a touchdown. Murray fumbled a pitch that was returned by DeAngelo Hall for a touchdown just when the Eagles were within six points.

Going into the final game of the season against the Giants, head coach Chip Kelly was fired and offensive coordinator Pat Shurmur became the interim head coach. Murray rushed for a 54-yard touchdown on his first carry and finished the 35–30 victory with 5.8 yards per carry average, his highest of the year. Murray finished the 2015 season with 193 carries for 702 yards and six touchdowns, and had only two games with over 20 carries, his lowest output since 2012. Murray's contract with the Eagles is frequently regarded as one of the worst free agent contracts in NFL history.

=== Tennessee Titans ===
==== 2016 season: Resurgent season ====
On March 9, 2016, Murray was traded to the Tennessee Titans along with the Eagles' 2016 fourth round draft pick, in exchange for the Titans' 2016 fourth round draft pick.

During the season-opening 25–16 loss to the Vikings, Murray had 42 rushing yards, 35 receiving yards, and two receiving touchdowns. In the next game against the Lions, he had a 67-yard rush as part of an 89-yard performance during the narrow 16–15 road victory. The following week against the Raiders, Murray rushed 16 times for 114 yards and a touchdown during the 17–10 loss.

During Week 4 against the Texans, he recorded 25 carries for 95 yards and two touchdowns in the 27–20 road loss. In the next game against the Miami Dolphins, Murray had 121 yards on 27 carries during the 30–17 road victory. Following the Dolphins game, Murray had six straight games with a touchdown and went over 100 rushing yards in three of them.

Murray posted 1,287 rushing yards on 293 carries in his first year with the Titans. His 12 total touchdowns, nine rushing and three receiving, ranked sixth among NFL running backs in 2016. Additionally, during a Week 10 47–25 victory over the Packers, Murray threw his first NFL touchdown on a 10-yard halfback pass to Delanie Walker. The Titans finished with a 9–7 record from a league-worst 3–13 record the season before, with Murray leading the AFC in rushing yards and finishing third in the league. He was named to his third career Pro Bowl on December 20, 2016, as a result of his successful season with the Titans. Murray was ranked 33rd by his fellow players on the NFL Top 100 Players of 2017.

==== 2017 season ====
Murray split carries with Heisman Trophy-winning second-year running back Derrick Henry and run-oriented quarterback Marcus Mariota, reaching 15 rushing attempts just once through Week 10. Despite the limited touches, Murray had 14 carries for 115 yards, including a 75-yard rushing touchdown, during a Week 3 33–27 victory over the Seahawks, and two rushing touchdowns along with the game-winning receiving touchdown during a Week 10 24–20 victory over the Bengals. Murray made his final appearance of the regular season in Week 16 against the Los Angeles Rams, recording 15 carries for 48 yards and a touchdown and three receptions for 11 yards before leaving the eventual 27–23 loss with a knee injury that kept him out of the regular-season finale and the playoffs.

Murray finished the 2017 season with 184 carries for a career-low 659 rushing yards and six touchdowns to go along with 39 receptions for 266 yards and a touchdown.

On March 8, 2018, Murray was released by the Titans.

=== Retirement ===
On July 13, 2018, Murray announced his retirement from the NFL.

== Career statistics ==
=== NFL ===
Legend
	AP NFL Offensive Player of the Year
	Led the league
**Bold**	Career high

==== Regular season ====
Year	Team	Games		Rushing					Receiving					Fumbles	
Year	Team	GP	GS	Att	Yds	Avg	Lng	TD	Rec	Yds	Avg	Lng	TD	Fum	Lost
2011	DAL	13	7	164	897	**5.5**	**91T**	2	26	183	7.0	18	0	1	0
2012	DAL	10	10	161	663	4.1	48	4	35	251	7.2	22	0	3	2
2013	DAL	14	14	217	1,121	5.2	43	9	53	350	6.6	22	1	3	1
2014	DAL	16	16	**392**	**1,845**	4.7	51	**13**	**57**	**416**	**7.3**	34	0	**5**	**5**
2015	PHI	15	8	193	702	3.6	54T	6	44	322	**7.3**	**44**	1	2	2
2016	TEN	16	16	293	1,287	4.4	75T	9	53	377	7.1	35	**3**	3	1
2017	TEN	15	15	184	659	3.6	75T	6	39	266	6.8	18	1	1	1
Career		99	86	1,604	7,174	4.5	91T	49	307	2,165	7.1	44	6	18	12

==== Postseason ====
Year	Team	Games		Rushing					Receiving					Fumbles	
Year	Team	GP	GS	Att	Yds	Avg	Lng	TD	Rec	Yds	Avg	Lng	TD	Fum	Lost
2014	DAL	2	2	44	198	4.5	30	2	4	27	6.8	13	0	1	1
2017	TEN	0	0	Did not play due to injury											
Career		2	2	44	198	4.5	30	2	4	27	6.8	13	0	1	1

=== College ===
Season	Team	GP	Rushing					Receiving					Kickoff return			
Season	Team	GP	Att	Yds	Avg	Lng	TD	Rec	Yds	Avg	Lng	TD	Ret	Yds	Avg	TD
2007	Oklahoma	11	127	764	**6.0**	**92**	13	14	60	4.3	25	0	15	439	**29.3**	**2**
2008	Oklahoma	13	179	1,002	5.6	70	14	31	395	**12.7**	34	4	**28**	**774**	27.6	0
2009	Oklahoma	12	171	705	4.1	38	8	41	522	**12.7**	67	4	0	0	0.0	0
2010	Oklahoma	14	**282**	**1,214**	4.3	63	**15**	**71**	**594**	8.4	**76**	**5**	10	249	24.9	0
Career		50	759	3,685	5.0	92	50	157	1,571	10.0	76	13	53	1,462	27.6	2

== Career highlights ==
=== Awards and honors ===
NFL

- NFL Offensive Player of the Year (2014)
- First-team All-Pro (2014)
- 3× Pro Bowl (2013, 2014, 2016)
- NFL rushing yards leader (2014)
- NFL rushing touchdowns co-leader (2014)
- PFWA All-Rookie Team (2011)
- 2× NFC Offensive Player of the Month: September and October 2014
- 6× FedEx Ground Player of the Week
- NFL Offensive Rookie of the Month: November 2011
- NFL Rookie of the Week: Week 7, 2011
- 3× NFL Top 100 — 87th (2014), 4th (2015), 33rd (2017)
- Second-most rushing yards in a single game by a rookie in NFL history: 253 (October 23, 2011, against the St. Louis Rams)
- First player in NFL history to start a season with eight consecutive games with at least 100 rushing yards

College

- 2× First-team All-Big 12 (2008, 2010)
- Second-team All-Big 12 (2009)

=== Cowboys franchise records ===
- Most rushing yards in a game by a rookie: 253 (October 23, 2011, against the St. Louis Rams)
- Most Rush Yds/Att in a game/as a rookie: 10.12 (October 23, 2011, against the St. Louis Rams)
- Most rushing yards over a three-game span: 466 (2011)
- Most rush attempts in a season: 392 (2014)
- Most rushing yards in a season: 1,845 (2014)
- Most scrimmage yards in a season: 2,261 (2014)
- Most games with at least 100 rushing yards (12 + 1 in postseason, 2014)
- Most Rush Yds/Att (career): 4.85 (tied with Tony Pollard)
- Most Rush Yds/Att (rookie season): 5.5 (2011)
- Most Rush Yds/Game (season): 115.3 (2014)
- Most All Purpose Yds (season): 2,261 (2014)

=== University of Oklahoma records ===
- Former all-time leader in points scored (390); surpassed by kicker Michael Hunnicutt in 2014
- All-time leader in touchdowns (65)
- All-time leader in all-purpose yards (6,718)
- All-time leader in receiving yards for a running back (1,571)
- All-time leader in kickoff return average (27.6)

== Post-playing career ==
In August 2018, a month after his retirement, Murray was added as a college football commentator for Fox Sports.

== Coaching career ==
On January 2, 2019, Murray joined Kevin Sumlin's staff at the Arizona Wildcats football team as the running backs coach.

On January 27, 2020, Murray returned to his alma mater, the University of Oklahoma, as running backs coach. In 2024, Murray was suspended for one game due to recruiting violations. He stated that he was unaware a COVID-19 era waiver had expired.

On February 11, 2026, Murray was hired by the Kansas City Chiefs to serve as the team's running backs coach.

== Personal life ==
Murray wed actress Heidi Mueller in 2015. They have two children.

Murray started the DeMarco Murray Foundation with the mission to provide families with seriously and chronically ill kids with daily encouragement and life-changing experiences. Murray also serves as The Chief Athletics Officer of Wellness in the Schools, a non profit organization that promotes healthy eating, environmental awareness and fitness for children in New York City public schools.

== See also ==
- List of Division I FBS rushing touchdown leaders
- List of NCAA Division I FBS career rushing touchdowns leaders
- List of National Football League annual rushing touchdowns leaders
- List of National Football League rushing champions
