= Quintuplets =

American television sitcom (2004–2005)

- Genre: Sitcom
- Created by: Mark Reisman
- Directed by: Andy Cadiff; Leonard R. Garner Jr.; Steve Zuckerman
- Starring: Andy Richter; Rebecca Creskoff; Jake McDorman; Johnny Lewis; April Matson; Sarah Wright; Ryan Pinkston
- Opening theme: "Suck or Shine" by Chris and Tad
- Composer: Jason Miller
- Country of origin: United States
- Original language: English
- No. of seasons: 1
- No. of episodes: 22

Production
- Executive producers: David Nevins; Mark Reisman
- Producers: Dan Signer; Jennifer Fisher; Andy Richter
- Cinematography: Joseph W. Calloway
- Camera setup: Multi-camera
- Running time: 22 minutes
- Production companies: Imagine Television; Mark Reisman Productions; 20th Century Fox Television

Original release
- Network: Fox
- Release: June 16, 2004 – January 12, 2005

Quintuplets is an American television sitcom that aired 22 episodes on Fox from June 16, 2004, to January 12, 2005. The program starred Andy Richter and Rebecca Creskoff and shared some of their experiences parenting teenage quintuplets.

== Synopsis ==
The series is set in Nutley, New Jersey, and looks like a typical family sitcom. Much of the storyline focuses on the difficulty of supporting a large family of teens, both financially and emotionally, as they grapple with the reality that they are no longer as cute as when they were babies.

The house is a typical three-bedroom family home. The three male siblings share a room with bunk beds while the two female siblings share another room. The kitchen contains a double-wide beer cooler as a refrigerator, and the basement contains a walk-in freezer, both to store the large amounts of food such a large family requires.

The theme song, "Suck or Shine", is performed by Chris and Tad.

== Cast and characters ==
- Bob Chase (Andy Richter) – The father sells office cubicles and barely makes enough money to support his large family. Most of his time is spent trying to save money, and he only occasionally provides parenting for his five teens, but he would prefer to get away whenever he has the chance. He also opines that he thinks half his children are freaks, blaming this and the fact that there were so many at once, on the fact that they were artificially inseminated.
- Carol Chase (Rebecca Creskoff) – The mother maintains the large family and house in "typical sitcom homemaker" mode. In one episode she attempts to go back to work, but nobody wants her because she has been raising kids for 15 years. She goes back to being a homemaker and remains one for the rest of the show. She enforces the house rules.
- Parker Chase (Jake McDorman) – The popular boy. Tallest of the children, good-looking, successful in academics and sports. He teases his brothers mercilessly, especially Pearce, but is also quick to defend them. The male quints share a deep bond, probably from sharing the womb. At one point the youngest and shortest, Patton, says that Parker took all the good genes and left him with the short ones and Pearce with the weird ones.
- Pearce Chase (Johnny K. Lewis) – The curly-haired weirdest quint. He boldly shares with anyone his strange perspective on just about any subject, and is so odd that he no longer responds to rejection.
- Penny Chase (April Matson) – The intellectual, who is vigorously nonconformist. Her taste in clothing and hairstyle frequently gets her mistaken for the typical goth. She enjoys reading and sometimes feels inadequate to Paige.
- Paige Chase (Sarah Wright) – The beautiful girl. She spends most of her time thinking of and attending to her appearance. She is not the brightest of the family, but she is bubbly and kind.
- Patton Chase (Ryan Pinkston) – The youngest of the children, and the shortest at 4'10". This is a source of amusement to the family and shame to the father, and the mother is often overly-nurturing. He takes growth hormones. He is girl-crazy and his typical line to girls (and, in one episode, a guy when he was pretending to be gay to avoid being pulverized) is, "Yes I am, you likey?." It usually works, but his sisters often find it disgusting.

== Episodes ==
No.	Title	Directed by	Written by	Original release date	Prod. code	U.S. viewers (millions)
1	"Pilot"	Andy Cadiff	Mark Reisman	June 16, 2004	1AJY79	7.12
Bob and Carol Chase miss the time when their quintuplets were small and cute and made them happy and popular. Fast-forward 15 years, and their kids are loud, obnoxious, and always fighting with one other. Anxious to get away from the kids for a night, Bob buys tickets for him and Carol to a Springsteen concert, where he encounters some "special brownies". Parker and Paige are set to go to a party when Carol unintentionally cancels the party by informing the host's parents. Concerned for their social lives, the quints decide to host a party in their home, where Patton hopes to score with an attractive girl.
2	"Quintagious"	Andy Cadiff	Carter Bays & Craig Thomas	June 23, 2004	1AJY01	5.63
When Penny catches the flu, the family enters a state of emergency and quarantines her in the basement to avoid a repeat of the last flu outbreak, which began when Bob dared Patton to lick a dead squirrel. Penny looks on the bright side: she finally gets to bask in 'her own room'! ...Until Paige falls ill and joins her in the basement. Penny promptly scams her out of her blankets, pillow, and slippers in exchange for listening to her gossip. When Carol visits them, Bob locks her down there for breaking the rules: anyone who goes down there is infected. Parker falls ill, infuriating Patton: this ruins a chance for a double date. Patton secures a date with the girl, but Pearce throws his lucky shirt down the laundry chute, and when Patton jumps down after it, Bob locks him in the basement. While looking after her children, Carol falls ill and becomes spiteful; meanwhile, Paige manages to gain back all her possessions as a mortified Penny has become addicted to gossip. Pearce remains the only healthy one, but after annoying his father, who is trying to work on an important sales pitch, he deliberately becomes ill and heads down to the basement. Realizing his chance, Bob has a great time by himself. Later, driven crazy by her sick kids, Carol climbs up the laundry chute.
3	"Little Man on Campus"	Andy Cadiff	Dan Signer	June 30, 2004	1AJY03	5.98
The Nutley High basketball team, the Cougars, hold tryouts: Parker makes the team and Pearce becomes team mascot. Paige does not make the cheerleading squad, but to Bob's horror and former cheerleader Carol's pride, Patton does make the squad, in a plot to meet girls. When Carol informs Bob that there are cheerleading scholarships, Bob's horror changes to excitement that he might have one less college education to finance. Patton quickly learns that working with fellow cheerleader Haley gives him erections. Bob's advice is to "go down to Horny Town and fire the mayor", which fails and Patton, the top of the pyramid, is humiliated at a basketball game. However, the incident lands Patton a date.
4	"Lord of the Cell"	Andy Cadiff	Michael Shipley & Jim Bernstein	July 7, 2004	1AJY02	5.86
When Bob wins a cell phone at work, the kids fight over who gets it. Carol reminds them that if there is not enough for everyone, no one gets anything. Parker protests that the rule only causes the kids to miss out on everything, so Bob initiates a contest: the kids have been slacking on chores, so whoever does the most chores in one week wins the cell phone. All the kids except Parker begin working to win the phone: Paige and Patton want the phone to benefit their social lives; Pearce wants to send the phone to Yabba, his Mongolian pen pal; and Penny wants the phone just to take it away from Paige. When Bob takes the contest too far and the kids become his personal servants, Parker leads the kids to strike against Bob and Carol. Bob eventually lets Parker decide who should get the phone. When Parker tells his siblings that he believes he most deserves the phone, they call this unfair and start fighting. Pearce breaks up the fight and shows his siblings how selfish they are being. Parker then gives the phone to Pearce so he can send it to Yabba. Pearce writes to Yabba to tell him the bad news: as he pockets the phone for himself, he informs Yabba that it was washed away in a terrible storm.
5	"(Disdainfully) The Helbergs"	Andy Cadiff	Jennifer Fisher	July 14, 2004	1AJY04	5.37
The Chases' car (the "Qu-Mobile" is Pearce's pet name for it) breaks down after 15 years. The family got the car free after making a commercial with quintuplet babies. Bob contacts the car company and pitches the idea of making a new commercial, to receive a new minivan. Pearce's nostalgic memories, such as first seeing snow, first hearing his mom laugh, and telling his first knock-knock joke, mean he cannot easily let go of the "Qu-Mobile." When they arrive to do the commercial, they discover that they must audition against their rivals: the perfect blond Helberg quintuplets, who are mercilessly managed by their greedy, arrogant, "no-lose" father Francis. Parker refuses to do a car commercial because of his new Greenpeace-minded girlfriend, so Paige's boyfriend Tyler pretends to be him. The Helbergs get the job because of the Chases' constant fighting, but when bossy Francis 'fires' his son Chad for becoming Penny's boyfriend, the company decides they cannot do a quintuplet commercial with four kids and the Chases are chosen. After Paige is seen kissing Tyler, who is supposed to be her brother, Francis demands the truth, and wants Paige and Parker, who is pretending to be Tyler, to kiss. The family is stunned, and Bob and Carol tell Paige to "kiss her boyfriend". Parker and Paige still look shocked as the family drives home in their brand-new minivan.
6	"Get a Job"	Steve Zuckerman	Michael Borkow	July 21, 2004	1AJY05	6.30
Bob and Carol awaken the kids on their half-birthday announcing they are finally old enough to get jobs. Paige and Patton become rival employees at a shoe store, while Penny finds holding down a job difficult when she calls all her bosses "idiots." Pearce finds work at a pet store and ends up buying all the animals away from customers, and Parker gets his first zit after working the deep-fryer at a fast-food place. Carol looks forward to spending the money they'll save from the kids' allowances on a cruise, so Bob is forced to hide the motorcycle and sidecar he already bought with the money.
7	"Swing, Swing, Swing"	Steve Zuckerman	Stephen Lloyd	July 28, 2004	1AJY06	5.01
The school homecoming dance approaches. Carol, who is still upset at Bob for going to Atlantic City and getting drunk on the night of their homecoming dance, decides to host a pre-party for the kids. Parker is forced to cancel a date with his love interest Carrie Friedman when school bully Gino Grazano forces him to take his sister Gina to the dance. Parker searches for ways to make himself undesirable, but the plan backfires. Patton is rejected by every girl in school in alphabetical order, so he pretends to by dying so adult-film star 'Catherine Zeta-Juggs' will be his date. Penny's planned protest appearance as a zombie couple with her "ironic gay date" Matt backfires when Pearce and Matt discover a mutual admiration of swing-dancing and decide to go to the dance together. Bob, concerned even for Pearce's reputation, manages to make Pearce and Matt jealous of each other to break them up.
8	"Shakespeare in Lust"	Andy Cadiff	Stephen Engel	August 4, 2004	1AJY08	6.04
Penny gets the chance of a lifetime to direct her own minimalist Romeo and Juliet school production, which can earn her a scholarship. Drama teacher Ms. Hentschel not only forces her to dump Matt as the lead Romeo for Patton, who gets to kiss Parker's girlfriend Carrie (who never kisses Parker on the lips); Bob and Carol make Penny put Paige in charge of props, which Penny plans to dispense with altogether. Ms. Hentschel frowns on Penny's minimalistic approach, so prompter Pearce convinces her to turn the play into a superhero themed adaptation. Frustrated that Patton is kissing his girlfriend, Parker sets out to sabotage the play. Meanwhile, Bob manages to get his neighbor Brad and his two girlfriends to invite him and Carol over for a dinner and jacuzzi, mistakenly believing they will be hot-tubbing naked with their neighbors.
9	"The Sixth Quint"	Andy Cadiff	Michael Shipley & Jim Bernstein	September 8, 2004	1AJY07	6.20
The beautiful Alayna Collins has just gotten back from a five-year trip to Africa, a fantastic surprise for the quints. Paige throws a slumber party to introduce Alayna to the jungle that is high school, while Bob and Carol spend a "wild night" at the Nutley Motor Inn. Patton spies on the slumber party from the boys' side of the house. Parker asks Pearce to help him become more-than-friends with Alayna, although Alayna has always liked Pearce. When Pearce talks to Alayna for Parker, she mistakes Parker's feelings for Pearce's.
10	"Loves, Lies and Lullabies"	Andy Cadiff	Michael Shipley & Jim Bernstein	September 15, 2004	1AJY09	6.19
Penny decides to conduct a live science project: manipulating the dumbest kid in class, Paige, who normally depends on nerds to do all the work for her, to construct a hemoglobin molecule model. Nerdy student Eric tells Penny that a "social science" project will get her a failing grade, so she convinces him to put his name on her project in exchange for her bra. Parker is disappointed when Jessica Geiger shows no interest whatsoever in him but takes to Patton instantly, and Patton discovers Jessica's fetish. Parker and Pearce's rivalry for Alayna continues when the three team up for their project, the human battery, testing it by using Parker's body to get electric shocks. Meanwhile, Carol is concerned that she is not charitable enough and volunteers in a seniors' home, where she discovers that the lullaby she sings them is causing them to die.
11	"Quint Con"	Andy Cadiff	Dan Signer	September 22, 2004	1AJY10	4.61
Although nobody but Carol likes them anymore, Carol insists the family participate in a multiples convention. Bob is forced to talk to a future quints father and convince them that raising quints is not so bad, but Bob lets the dad in on the truth and the dad walks out on his wife. Patton meets sexy twins who will not date separately, so he makes up an imaginary twin brother, Peter. Pearce has constructed a womb experience, which Parker gets in on to make money. Penny and Paige date twins they met years earlier as unattractive preteens, but both twins prefer the better kisser, Penny.
12	"Battle of the Bands"	Andy Cadiff	Boyce Bugliari & Jamie McLaughlin	September 29, 2004	1AJY11	5.20
The school's Battle of the Bands approaches, and Paige asks Patton to help the other girls in her dance routine, but it turns out that Paige needs the most help. Feeling left out after missing his Battle of the Bands, worms his way into Parker's band and Parker walks out. Pearce uses an unusual instrument for his one-man band.
13	"Working It"	Andy Cadiff	Jennifer Fisher	October 6, 2004	1AJY12	5.09
Bob had not made a sale in two months, so he is hell-bent to land Mr. Reynolds' office contract, but his constant agreeing and "me too" approach requires Patton to play a 10-year-old Boy Scout (for a percentage of the profit). Bob and Carol "warm up" to the client's wife's ludicrous fashion creations and Bob fakes a passion for lobster although he is deathly allergic. Paige refuses to pay back any of the money she borrowed from Penny, so Penny gets a waitress job there to make sure the terrible service will kill Paige's tips until she pays up. Parker comes up with the perfect plan for him and Pearce to each get alone-time with Alayna.
14	"Boobs on the Run"	Andy Cadiff	Boyce Bugliari & Jamie McLaughlin	November 3, 2004	1AJY14	5.59
When the boys decide that they're going to a frat party, they infiltrate Luskin's life by joining him on an ice run. Luskin quickly takes the trip to new heights, to Parker's dismay. Meanwhile, fed up with the girls' lies, Carol demands to hear every lie they've ever told her; and Bob escapes from his family.
15	"Teacher's Pet"	Leonard R. Garner Jr.	Gloria Calderon Kellett	November 10, 2004	1AJY13	5.82
Carol cannot handle tutoring Pearce anymore, so Bob takes over--and gets suckered into writing Pearce's English paper for him, to prove to Carol that he can get a higher grade than a C. Ever-ambitious Patton pretends to need tutoring so he can get close to his hot new English teacher. Paige manages to convert Penny's favorite, most challenging teacher into a fellow fashion slave.
16	"Thanksgiving Day Charade"	Andy Cadiff	Boyce Bugliari & Jamie McLaughlin	November 24, 2004	1AJY16	5.31
Carol hires Penny to play the devoted daughter to make a good impression on her college friend Lisa, now a London publisher, when she visits on Thanksgiving. Bob's brother Steve, a sports agent, also stops by and pretends to help out at a shelter, but actually he takes Bob to a nightclub as a wingman to entertain Lisa Appleby, the friend of Olympic swimmer Amanda Beard whom he hopes to sign; Bob loses his wedding ring. Pearce interrogates Penny to makes sure the turkey she bought died in a humane way. Meanwhile, French exchange-student Gabrielle seems to fall for Patton but has precise preferences: her man must sweat like a horse, shave his legs, and wear mime lipstick.
17	"Date Night"	Andy Cadiff	Michael Shipley & Jim Bernstein	December 1, 2004	1AJY17	4.79
Carol is disappointed that neither Parker nor Penny wants to go out with the parents for 'special quint night' anymore, so she tricks Bob into going to the diner where Parker and his date Eliza are dining, even reserving the table next to them. To both Bob and Parker's horror, her interference only makes Eliza insist they pull the tables together and enjoy embarrassing memories. Paige dates Hugo, the unattractive son of a banker, whose money literally blinds her. Penny dares her to go out with him at her own expense, so Paige will truly see Hugo. Patton goes to help Chelsea with her computer, but her dog Twinkle is an overprotective bodyguard, so he gets Pearce to come along to entertain the dog. When Bob explains to Carol that she is only driving Parker away, she transfers her "quality time" to Bob.
18	"Bob and Carol Save Christmas"	Andy Cadiff	Bill Kunstler	December 15, 2004	1AJY18	5.12
Bob and Carol find the quints are really sick of 'Quintsmass', the holiday celebrated on December 27 when they buy Christmas presents at after-Christmas sales, so they decide to risk their whole Christmas budget on blackjack in Atlantic City. Meanwhile, Parker looks forward to playing Joseph in a Nativity scene with a hot girl, but Patton worms his way in, for lack of an open part of live Baby Jesus, and lives Parker's odd nightmare. Paige is so eager to sing carols with the "Tinsel Tones" that she promises Penny her MP3 player to stand in for a sick alto. Penny, who hates caroling, accepts but deliberately misses every tone until the director throws her out. Pearce begs hard enough to get another go as an elf (although way older than his colleagues) with the same Santa he bit as a toddler. Santa fears more pain to come, which proves someone else's opportunity.
19	"Where Are They Now?"	Andy Cadiff	Bill Kunstler	December 22, 2004	1AJY15	4.84
Bob is delighted one of the TV shows that hovered around the quints as babies plans to make a "Where Are They Now" special on them, but when Patton tells him that producer Mark Lawrence also makes reality TV, the two hope to convince him to produce a reality show about the Chases. They fear that all-American athlete Parker is too tame, so Bob wants him to look and act like a marijuana addict. Carol's embarrassed that she failed to return to work as she told the interviewer she would in the original special, so Bob pays her former boss to 'hire' her back in publishing. Pearce melts when told that Alayna has broken up with her boyfriend. Patton sees an opportunity to cast a sexy, camera-horny girlfriend, but the one he picks cannot even remember his name.
20	"Shall We Fight"	Andy Cadiff	Stephen Engel	December 29, 2004	1AJY20	4.92
Patton's girlfriend Julie and Penny's boyfriend Brady enjoy double-dating, but Patton and Penny do not, eventually driving their dates away. Pearce enlists Parker's help to stop clinging to Alayna, even with handcuffs and projectiles. Carol forces Bob to take dance lessons with her, and Matt far too generously offers to teach them for free and after hours. Bob ends up injuring Carol's ankle, but she makes him continue the course alone. When Matt chickens out of the hopeless task, he arranges for a female colleague, Sophia, to take his place, leaving Carol jealous.
21	"Chutes and Letters"	Andy Cadiff	Dan Signer	January 5, 2005	1AJY19	5.78
Parker and Patton give Pearce brotherly advice when they realize that Pearce is still a virgin and has not even gotten to "second base" with a girl. Patton teams up with a new girl to sell his "secret odorless aphrodisiac" (water). Carol enjoys getting out of the monthly task of taking the girls to visit her 98-year-old Great-Aunt Sylvia, a nasty old woman, but envies Bob when Sylvia dies during his and the girls' visit with her.
22	"The Coconut Kapow"	Andy Cadiff	Boyce Bugliari & Jamie McLaughlin	January 12, 2005	1AJY21	5.06
Carol forbids Patton to date for a month "to teach him respect for girls" and forces Paige to get rid of all her clothes that do not fit. Paige tells Pearce that she cannot bring herself to sell the unlucky half at the second-hand shop and he volunteers to take them. When he actually takes the wrong pile, she concludes that he has not taken them yet and donates the unwanted half as well. Pressed by Carol to teach Patton something that will give him a better source of pride than seducing girls, Bob shows him his old wrestling moves, in turn abusing Parker, but Patton faces humiliation when he learns that he'll be fighting a girl. Penny dares Parker to take the car for a joyride and a red-light camera catches them.

== Reception ==
Tim Goodman of the San Francisco Chronicle called it: "a moronic dull-fest that is, in turns, physically painful to watch and jaw-droppingly, stupendously stupid."

== See also ==
- Arrested Development – in which Richter himself played a set of identical quintuplets.
