= Saints Peter and Paul Jesuit Church =

Historic church in Michigan, United States

- Saints Peter and Paul Church
- U.S. National Register of Historic Places
- Michigan State Historic Site
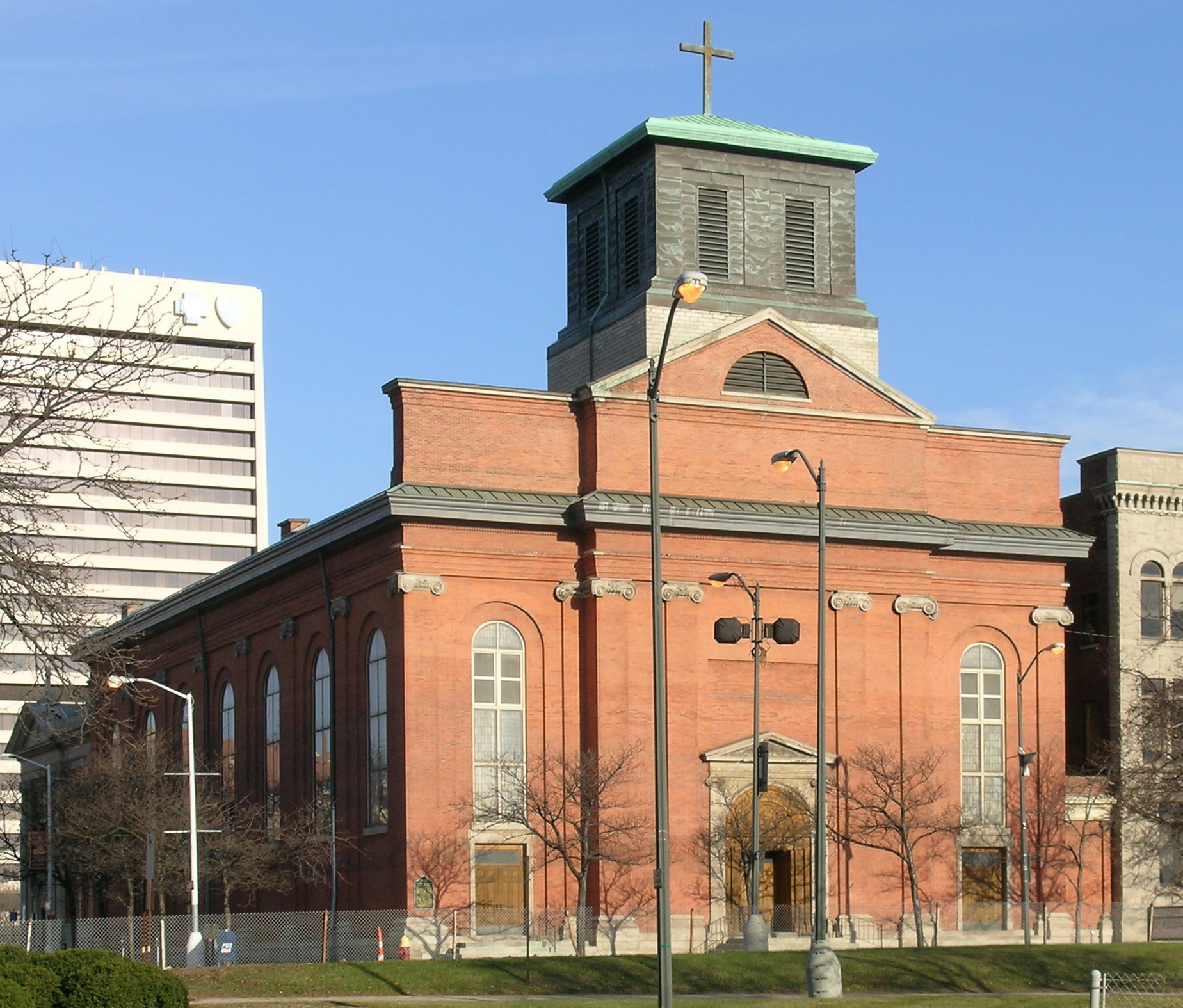
- Church in 2008
- Interactive map
- Location: 629 East Jefferson Avenue; Detroit, Michigan
- Coordinates: 42°19′55″N 83°2′18″W
- Built: 1848
- Architect: Francis Letouneau, Peter Kindenkins
- Architectural style: Romanesque Revival
- NRHP reference No.: 71000431

Significant dates
- Added to NRHP: September 03, 1971
- Designated MSHS: January 22, 1971

Saints Peter and Paul Jesuit Church is a Roman Catholic church located at 629 East Jefferson Avenue in Detroit, Michigan. It is the oldest existing church in the city of Detroit, and was listed on the National Register of Historic Places and designated a Michigan State Historic Site in 1971.

== History ==
In 1844, Bishop Peter Paul Lefevere, who served as coadjutor bishop of the Diocese of Detroit, began construction on Saints Peter and Paul Cathedral; the cornerstone is dated June 29, 1844. Francis Letourneau drew the plans and Peter Kindenkens supervised the construction. Construction was completed over four years, as the bishop paid for each stage of construction with cash. The church was consecrated on June 29, 1848, as the cathedral church of the diocese. The original parishioners were predominantly Irish, with some French families attending.

Following Lefevere's death, under Caspar Borgess, the second Bishop of Detroit, the church remained the cathedral until 1877, when he gave the title to the building to the Jesuit Order with the intention of starting Detroit's first Catholic college. The church then became SS. Peter & Paul Jesuit Church. The Jesuit college eventually became the University of Detroit-Mercy, and UDM's law school still occupies the building adjacent to the church.

The church was altered in 1879 and 1882, completely renovated in 1892, and remodeled again in 1911. A chapel was added to the rear of the building in 1918. Although these alterations changed the look of the church, the original plan has been substantially preserved. The church is still in use, offering Sunday and some weekday masses.

== Description ==
Saints Peter and Paul Church is a three-aisled church, built of Detroit common brick. The front façade is gabled and topped by a short square belfry. The tower was originally intended to support a tall spire, which was never built. There is a central entrance pavilion, set between arched windows and Ionic pilasters. The pilasters continue along the side, separating the side elevation into seven bays with tall, rounded arch windows. A heavy frieze surmounts the walls.

The interior of the church features hand-carved oak confessionals, a barrel vaulted ceiling painted with murals of the apostles, and an extraordinary Carrara marble altar designed by Gustav Adolph Mueller and featuring a bas relief of the crucifixion by Joseph Sibbel. These details were added during later renovations; the organ case is the only surviving original element.

== Gallery ==
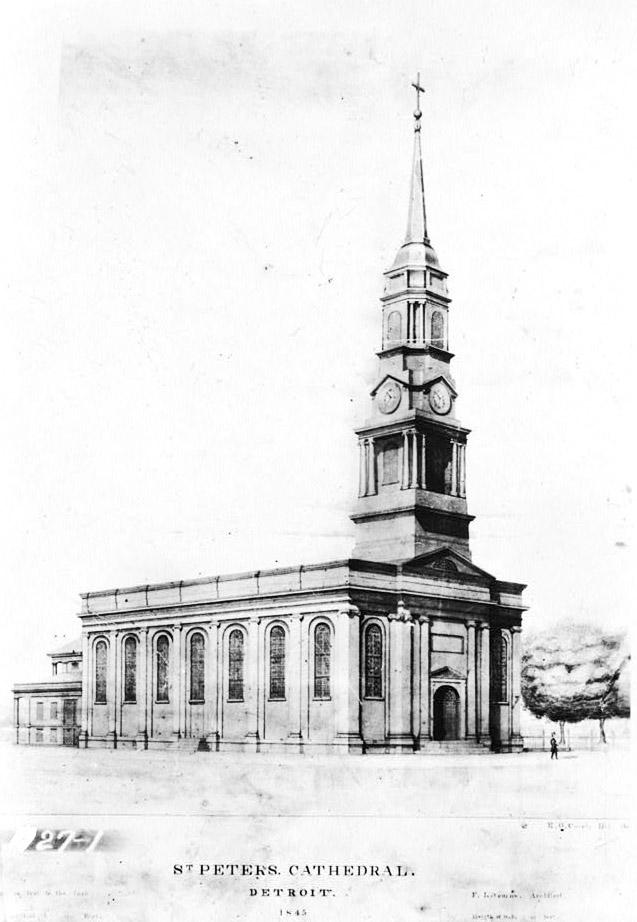
Original planned appearance.

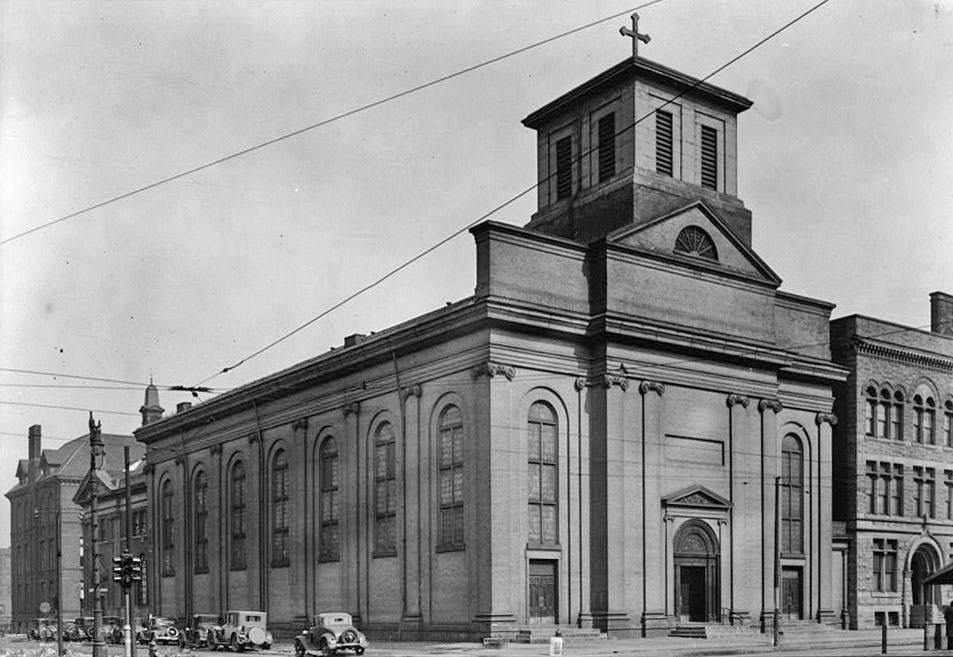
The church in 1934

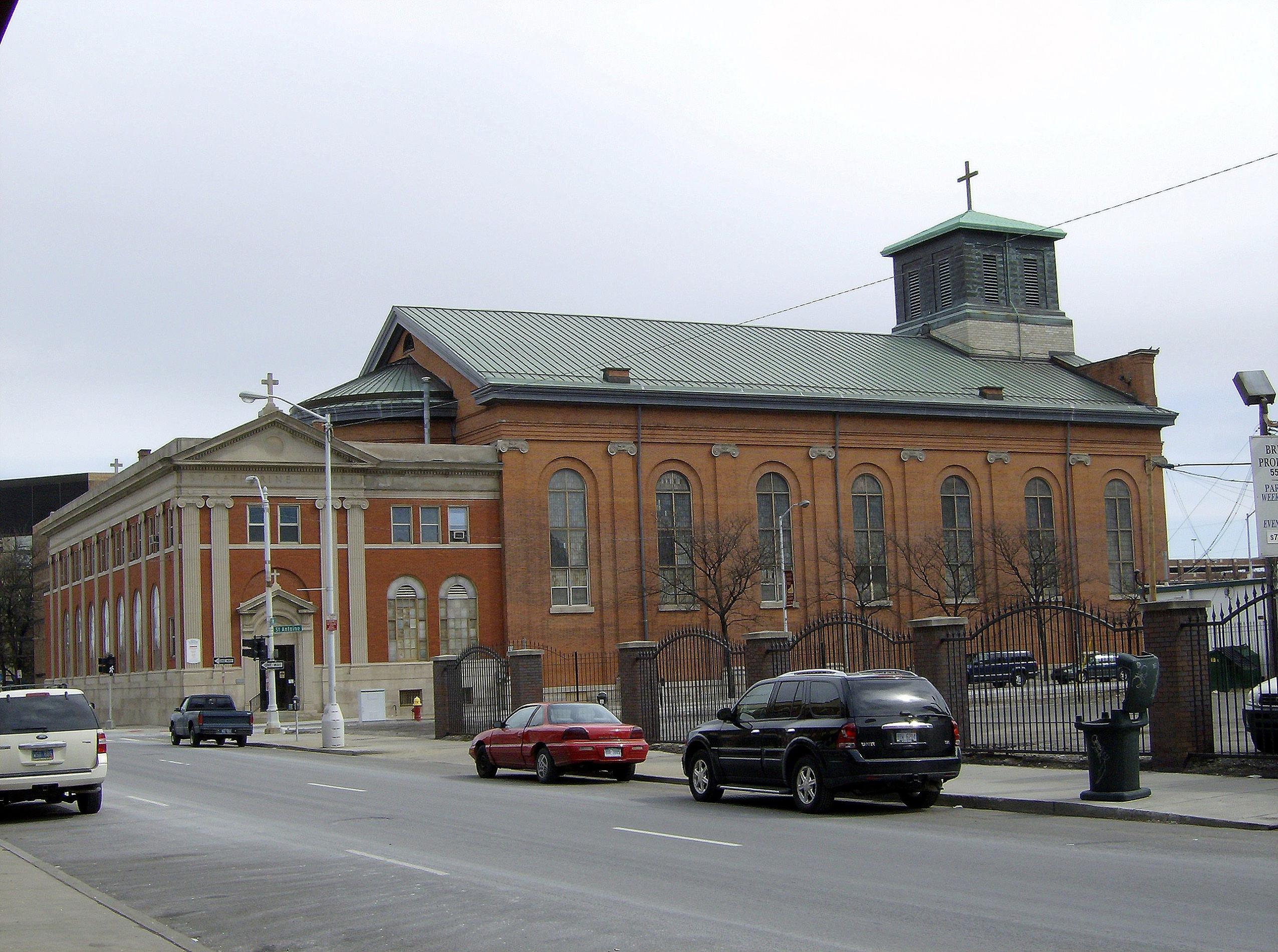
Side elevation of the church, 2007

== See also ==
- List of Catholic cathedrals in the United States
- List of cathedrals in the United States
