= Vile (film) =

2011 film by Taylor Sheridan

- Theatrical release poster
- Directed by: Taylor Sheridan
- Written by: Eric Beck; Rob Kowsaluk
- Produced by: Eric Beck; Kelly Andrea Rubin
- Starring: Eric Jay Beck; April Matson; Akeem Smith; Greg Cipes; Maya Hazen; Heidi Mueller; McKenzie Westmore
- Cinematography: Stewart Yost
- Music by: Corey Wallace
- Production companies: Outsider Pictures; Tony-Seven Films; Vile Entertainment
- Distributed by: Inception Media Group
- Release dates: August 26, 2011 (Film4 FrightFest); June 24, 2012 (United States)
- Running time: 88 minutes
- Country: United States
- Language: English

Vile is a 2011 American horror film directed by Taylor Sheridan in his directorial debut and starring Eric Jay Beck, April Matson, Akeem Smith, Greg Cipes, Maya Hazen, Heidi Mueller, and McKenzie Westmore. It follows ten kidnapped captives who have 22 hours to mount an escape from a locked room, and must endure excruciating pain in order to win their freedom. It premiered at the Film4 FrightFest on August 26, 2011 before its wide release in the United States on June 24, 2012.

== Plot summary ==
A man wakes with a machine extracting fluids from his head as his chest is torn open and salt is poured in the wound. After he dies the mysterious fluid is then converted into pills by his captor.

Couples Tony and Kai, Nick and the pregnant Tayler are on a camping trip. The group stop to help a woman, who knocks them out with a gas.

They awake in a house with other captives, where a video explains that they all have devices in their heads that extract fluid as they endure pain. If they don't experience enough to fill a bar within 22 hours, the devices will kill them. A victim named Julian attempts to remove his, but doing so instantly kills him. The rest agree to share the pain to escape.

Tensions rise as they take turns torturing each other with boiling water, drills and pliers. The first to volunteer, Greg, seems to know more than he lets on. Another captive named Tara takes it too far by killing Kai. Tony tortures Tara to death in retaliation, getting the bar to eighty percent. The group fills the bar by breaking their collarbones. Another video plays, explaining that the door will open for one person at a time as a machine removes the devices.

As they escape Nick hears Tony yelling for help outside the door. Upon exiting the room, Nick finds that a captive named Sam has killed anyone who exited, including Tony. He gives chase while Tayler goes back for the mortally wounded Greg, who admits he was aware of the cult before dying. Sam explains that the cult believes that pain is a purifying experience, which everyone should endure.

Greg's death causes the meter to go back down, forcing Tayler to torture herself to refill it. Meanwhile, Nick manages to kill Sam, but not before Sam poisons them through their devices. Nick finds and takes an antidote, but is unable to reach Tayler before she dies.

Shaken, Nick leaves the facility. Later he sees the same woman who abducted them preparing to capture more people. He attacks her in a rage and throws her into his trunk, presumably planning to torture her as revenge.

== Cast ==
- April Matson as Tayler
- Akeem Smith as Tony
- Greg Cipes as Sam
- Eric Jay Beck as Nick
- Elisha Skorman as Kai
- Heidi Mueller as Lisa
- Maya Hazen as Tara
- McKenzie Westmore as Diane
- Ian Bohen as Julian
- Kieron Elliot as Thomas
- Mark Hengst as Chuck
- Maynard James Keenan as Special Agent Ford (scenes removed from the final cut)

== Production ==
Taylor Sheridan, who went on to write Sicario and Hell or High Water and write and direct Wind River, is credited as director on the film. However, he does not consider the film his directorial debut, stating in a 2017 Rotten Tomatoes interview:

I would say this [Wind River] is my feature debut. A friend of mine raised — I don't know what he raised — 20 grand or something, and cast his buddies, and wrote this bad horror movie, that I told him not to direct. He was going to direct it and produce it, and he started and freaked out, and called and said, "Can you help me?" I said, "Yeah, I'll try." I kind of kept the ship pointed straight, and they went off and edited, and did what they did. I think it's generous to call me the director. I think he was trying to say thank you, in some way. It was an excellent opportunity to point a camera and learn some lessons that actually benefited me on Wind River.

== Reception ==
The film grossed 45 million dollars against its 11 million dollar budget, making it a financial success.

However, the film is often criticized for pacing issues, being "torture porn", and writing that lacks logic. It has been unfavorably compared to the "Saw" franchise, being accused of being a copy.
