= Tom Mueller (American football) =

American football player and coach

Biographical details
- Born: c. 1945

Playing career
- c. 1968: Upper Iowa
- Position: Defensive back

Coaching career (HC unless noted)
- 1973–1977: Sibley HS (IA)
- 1978–1989: East HS (IA) (assistant)
- 1980: Waterloo Central HS (IA)
- 1981–1982: Morningside (DC)
- 1983–1989: Nebraska–Omaha (assistant)
- 1990–1993: Nebraska–Omaha

Head coaching record
- Overall: 12–31 (college)

Tom Mueller (born c. 1945) is an American former football coach. He served as the head football coach at the University of Nebraska Omaha from 1990 to 1993, compiling a record of 12–31. A native of Elkader, Iowa, Mueller played college football as a defensive back at Upper Iowa University. He coached high school football in Iowa and was the defensive coordinator at Morningside College from 1981 to 1982, before coming to Nebraska–Omaha as an assistant in 1983.

== Head coaching record ==
=== College ===
Year	Team	Overall	Conference	Standing	Bowl/playoffs
Nebraska–Omaha Mavericks (North Central Conference) (1990–1993)
1990	Nebraska–Omaha	2–9	1–8	10th	
1991	Nebraska–Omaha	6–4	4–4	7th	
1992	Nebraska–Omaha	2–9	0–9	10th	
1993	Nebraska–Omaha	2–9	1–8	T–9th	
Nebraska–Omaha:		12–31	6–29		
Total:		12–31			
