= Pamela Bauer Mueller =

American writer

- Born: September 14, 1945 (age 80); Chicago, Illinois
- Education: Lewis & Clark College
- Occupation: Writer
- Website: Official website

Pamela Bauer Mueller (September 14, 1945) is an American writer of historical novels and children's books.

== Early life and education ==
Bauer-Mueller was born in Chicago, Illinois, on September 14, 1945. She was raised in North Bend and Klamath Falls, Oregon. She graduated from Lewis & Clark College in Portland, Oregon, with a degree in Spanish.

== Biography ==
Bauer-Mueller worked for two years as a flight attendant for Pan American Airlines. She left Pan American and married Mexican architect Eduardo Gual. The couple lived in Mexico City for eighteen years. Pamela and Eduardo have two children, Cassandra and Ticiana. She brought her daughters to San Diego, California, in 1986, where they lived for the next eight years. Bauer-Mueller worked as a model, an actress, and an English and Spanish language instructor during her time in Mexico.

After returning to the United States, she became an officer for the U.S. Customs Service, working for twelve years in San Diego, California, and then moving to Vancouver, British Columbia, Canada. She worked on this foreign assignment for five more years.

In 1995, Bauer-Mueller married Michael Mueller. They met while training for the U.S. Customs Service. Bauer-Mueller took early retirement from the government to write her first children's book, following her husband back to Georgia for his instructor position at the Federal Law Enforcement Training Center. They now reside in Jekyll Island, Georgia.

== Books ==
Bauer-Mueller has written The Kiska Trilogy; Hello, Goodbye, I Love You; Neptune's Honor, An Angry Drum Echoed, Aloha Crossing, Splendid Isolation, Water to My Soul, Lady Unveiled, The Dancing Delilahs, A Shadow of Hope; Fly, Fly Away; and The Sky Is My Home in Georgia.

Starting with Neptune's Honor: A Story of Loyalty and Love (2004), Bauer Mueller has written various historical novels.

== Recognition ==
Her books have won awards at the San Francisco Book Festival, New York Book Festival, Paris Book Festival, New England Book Festival, Great Southeast Book Festival, and many other book festivals.

== Bibliography ==
- Bauer Mueller, Pamela (2023). The Sky Is My Home (forthcoming, January 2023). ISBN 978-0980916379
- Bauer Mueller, Pamela (2020). Fly, Fly Away. ISBN 978-0980916362
- Bauer Mueller, Pamela (2018). A Shadow of Hope. ISBN 978-0980916355
- Bauer Mueller, Pamela (2016). The Dancing Delilahs (out of print). ISBN 978-0980916348
- Bauer Mueller, Pamela (2014). Lady Unveiled. ISBN 978-0980916331
- Bauer Mueller, Pamela (2012). Water To My Soul. ISBN 978-0980916317
- Bauer Mueller, Pamela (2010). Splendid Isolation. ISBN 978-0980916300
- Bauer Mueller, Pamela (2008). Aloha Crossing. ISBN 978-0968509791
- Bauer Mueller, Pamela (2007). An Angry Drum Echoed. ISBN 978-0968509784
- Bauer Mueller, Pamela (2005). Neptune's Honor. ISBN 978-0968509753
- Bauer Mueller, Pamela (2003). Hello, Goodbye, I Love You. ISBN 978-0968509739
- Bauer Mueller, Pamela (2001). Eight Paws to Georgia. ISBN 978-0968509722
- Bauer Mueller, Pamela (2000). Rain City Cats. ISBN 978-0968509715
- Bauer Mueller, Pamela (1999). The Bumpedy Road. ISBN 978-0968509708
