= Christopher Mueller =

Christopher or Chris Mueller may refer to:

- Chris Mueller (ice hockey) (born 1986), American ice hockey player
- Chris Mueller (soccer) (born 1996), American soccer player
- Kit Mueller (Christopher J. Mueller, born c. 1971), American basketball player

== See also ==
- Mueller (disambiguation)
- Christopher Moeller (born 1963), writer and painter
