= Merv Mueller =

Australian cricketer

Personal information
- Full name: Mervyn Edward Christopher Edgar Mueller
- Born: 3 October 1914; Yatala South, South Australia
- Died: 22 July 1984 (aged 69); South Plympton, South Australia
- Batting: Right-handed
- Role: Opening batsman

Domestic team information
- Years: Team
- 1937/1938: South Australia

Career statistics
Competition	First-class
Matches	2
Runs scored	94
Batting average	31.33
100s/50s	0/1
Top score	56
Catches/stumpings	0/–
- Source: CricketArchive, 11 August 2015

Mervyn Edward Christopher Edgar Mueller (3 October 1914 – 22 July 1984) was an Australian cricketer who played two first-class matches for South Australia during the 1937–38 season.

Mueller was born in suburban Adelaide, and attended Adelaide High School. He worked in the country for two years after graduating, and after his return to Adelaide in 1934 began playing for Prospect in the local grade cricket competition, as an opening batsman. In December 1937, Mueller was selected to make his state debut, playing against Western Australia at Adelaide Oval. The match had first-class status, but was not part of the Sheffield Shield, as Western Australia had not yet been admitted to that competition. On debut, Mueller opened alongside his Prospect teammate, wicket-keeper Charlie Walker, and made 56 in the first innings. This was only bettered by the century scored by Don Bradman, the captain both of South Australia and the Australian national side.

Mueller's second and final first-class match was a Sheffield Shield fixture against Victoria towards the end of the season, in February 1938. He scored only a single run in the first innings, out leg before wicket to Test bowler Morris Sievers, but in the second innings scored 37 out of a 95-run opening stand with his new partner, Richard Whitington. Despite that performance and his earlier half-century, Mueller was omitted from the state squad for the opening match of the 1938–39 season, against New South Wales. He never again played at state level, but did serve as coach of Prospect for a period, starting in the 1953–54 season. During the Second World War, Mueller served with the Royal Australian Air Force (RAAF). He had reached the rank of corporal by the end of the war, at which time he was stationed at the No. 1 Aircraft Depot in Victoria. Mueller died in Adelaide in July 1984, aged 69. His son is Lieutenant General Desmond Mueller AO, former Vice Chief of the Australian Defence Force.
