= William Boyce Mueller =

William Boyce Mueller (1942–1993), founder of Forgotten Scouts, is buried in the gay corner of the Congressional Cemetery, in Washington, D.C.

== Early life ==
William Boyce Mueller was the grandson of Chicago publisher William D. Boyce, the founder of the Boy Scouts of America.

== Activism ==
On the 75th anniversary from the founding of Boy Scouts of America, Mueller and his mother, Virginia Boyce Lind, led a procession of 10,000 Scouts to pay homage to his grandfather's grave in Ottawa Avenue Cemetery, Ottawa, Illinois. In October 1992 in San Francisco, Mueller, together with Ken MacPherson and Allan Shore, created the first organization to fight against the ban on gay Scouts and Scout leaders, Forgotten Scouts. "I don't think my grandfather would have wanted me excluded from Scouting just because of my sexual orientation. My grandfather would not have tolerated discrimination. He founded the Boy Scouts for all boys, not just for some. I realized that if people like me don't take a stand, the world isn't going to change."

He is buried at Congressional Cemetery, in Washington, D.C., and his tombstone reads: "Founder of-Forgotten Scouts, Beloved son of Virginia Boyce Lind, Grandson of William Dixon Boyce, Founder of-Boy Scouts of American".
