= Karl Friedrich Müller-Pfalz =

German pianist and composer

Karl Friedrich Müller-Pfalz (Pirmasens, 2 March 1894 – Berlin, 19 December 1969) was a concert pianist and composer.

== Early life and education ==
Karl Friedrich Müller-Pfalz was born to Fritz Müller-Pfalz, a schoolteacher, and Lina Heim in Pirmasens, Pfalz. After matriculating from the Theresien-Gymnasium München, he studied music from 1912 to 1919 at LMU Munich and the Humboldt University of Berlin, from 1919 to 1921 at the Akademie der Tonkunst München, and from 1928 to 1929 at the Akademie für Kunst- und Schulmusik Berlin.

== Musical career and composition ==
Müller-Pfalz made his debut as a concert pianist in 1901, and from 1921 regularly performed as both a solo pianist and an accompanist for Lieder. In 1925 he married Margarete Gruher, and in 1931 he received his Dr. Phil. He was a prolific composer of Lieder, with over 200 titles in manuscript, with texts by Max Dauthendey, Carl Busse, Eva von Collani, Theodor Storm, Eduard K. Bauer, Frida Jung, Ilona Bodden, Richard Dehmel, and Eugen Brehm, among others. For most of his late career, he worked as a freelance composer and performer in Berlin, dying there in 1969.

=== Selected compositions ===
- Lieder 1. Folge (1935–1936)
- Lieder 2. Folge (1936)
- Der brennende Kalender. Lieder von Max Dauthendy (1935)
- Suite in C für Klavier (1936)
- Volkstümliche Lieder von der Liebe für Sopran und Klavier (1935)
- Valse caprice (ca. 1950)
- Lieder für Sopran und Klavier (ca. 1960)
- Rawa -Konzertwalzer für 2 Klaviere- (ca. 1960)
