= Heidi Mueller =

American actress (born 1982)

- Born: Heidi Jo Mueller; January 29, 1982 (age 44); Cincinnati, Ohio, U.S.
- Occupation: Actress
- Spouse: DeMarco Murray (m. 2015)
- Children: 2

Heidi Jo Mueller (born January 29, 1982) is an American actress. She portrayed the role of Kay Bennett in the NBC daytime soap opera Passions from 2003 until 2008.

== Career ==
Prior to Passions, Mueller appeared alongside her father Don Mueller and her siblings on the NBC reality TV series Who Wants to Marry My Dad?.

Mueller joined Passions in mid-2003, as the fourth actress to portray Kay Bennett (she also played Kay's ancestor Prudence Standish in a flashback), acting alongside Molly Stanton and Jesse Metcalfe. She continued in the role when the series switched to DirecTV on September 17.

In 2007, Mueller appeared with co-star Adrian Bellani on The Tyra Banks Show for a feature in which host Tyra went through "soap opera school."

Juliet Mills, Mueller's costar on Passions, said of Mueller in 2007, "When she started, she had never acted and came from the reality show ... she was always very serious about the work and worked really hard to learn her lines. A soap opera is like boot camp. Now, she makes it all seem very spontaneous, and she's right there for you. It's really been lovely to see her grow as an actress." Passions costar Ben Masters added that Mueller "has the ability to make the words come out of her mouth so naturally; [dialogue] comes cascading out of her. I did a whole week with her where we had all these scenes, page after page after page; it was just wonderful. It's like she's got a perfect pitch as an actress."

In 2011, Mueller starred in the Taylor Sheridan film Vile.

== Personal life ==
Mueller dated 98 Degrees member Justin Jeffre from 2003 to 2004. She was previously engaged to actor Matthew Lawrence from 2004 to 2006. In 2015, she married professional football player DeMarco Murray. Together, they have two children.
