= Gustave A. Mueller =

American homeopath and surgeon

- Born: November 10, 1863; Crestline, Ohio, U.S.
- Died: February 9, 1912 (aged 48); Pittsburgh, Pennsylvania, U.S.
- Education: Sharpsburg Academy; University of Michigan; Hahnemann Medical College
- Occupation: Homeopath
- Spouse(s): Grace Miller (m. 1891; d. 1896) Nellie Day Anderson (m. 1900)
- Children: Gustav Mueller Jr. Robert Mueller
- Relatives: Robert Mueller III (great-grandson)

Gustave Adolph Mueller (November 10, 1863 – February 9, 1912) was an American homeopath and surgeon at the Homeopathic Hospital of Pittsburgh. He was described by The Pittsburgh Press as a leading specialist in the treatment of the eye, the ear, the nose and the throat and "a high authority in homeopathic medicine".

== Early life and education ==
Mueller was born in Crestline, Ohio, in 1863. His family moved to Pittsburgh, Pennsylvania, where he grew up with his five sisters. He was educated at the Sharpsburg Academy. He graduated from the University of Michigan, and he earned a medical degree from the Hahnemann Medical College, now known as Drexel University College of Medicine.

== Career ==
Mueller was appointed as the city physician of Allegheny, Pennsylvania, serving until 1884. Mueller went to Germany to study at the Friedrich Wilhelm University of Berlin, Heidelberg University, the Ludwig-Maximilians-Universität München, the University of Vienna, leading centers of the day. He also spent time in Paris and London.

Mueller returned to Pittsburgh, where he became a surgeon at the Homeopathic Hospital of Pittsburgh. He established that as his life's work, and became involved in various professional medical associations through the years, particularly those associated with homeopathy.

Mueller served on the Pennsylvania Medical Board, and on the Board of Medical Examiners for the Homeopathic Medical Society of Pennsylvania. He was a member of the American Institute of Homeopathy, the Institute of Homeopathy of Pennsylvania, and the Institute of Homeopathy of Allegheny County. He was described by The Pittsburgh Press in his obituary as "a high authority in homeopathic medicine" and as "one of the leading specialists" in the treatment of the eye, the ear, the nose and the throat.

Mueller was a co-founder of the Bank of Secured Savings of Allegheny. He was a member of the Crescent lodge of the Masons and several other initiate societies.

== Personal life and death ==
Mueller married Grace Miller in 1891. She died in 1896. At the age of 37 he married again, to Nellie Day Anderson in 1900. They had two sons together, Gustave Jr. and Robert. They resided in Oakmont, Pennsylvania, near Pittsburgh.

Mueller died of typhoid on February 9, 1912, in Pittsburgh, and his funeral was held at the Trinity Cathedral. His widow auctioned their property in October 1912.
