= Gustav Emil Mueller =

Gustav Emil Mueller (May 12, 1898 – July 10, 1987) was a Swiss philosopher and Hegelian scholar.

Mueller was born in Bern, Switzerland, and received a doctorate in philosophy in 1923 from the University of Bern. He studied also at the University of Heidelberg. After teaching in European universities and joining the faculty of the University of Oregon in 1925, he became a professor of philosophy at the University of Oklahoma in 1930 where he remained on the faculty until his retirement in 1968. He then returned to Bern, where he continued to work and write until the end of his life. Here is a quote:

We are human in being with and for one another, I cannot be human by or for myself. I distrust this "I alone" of the mystic; is it not a spiritual gluttony? The historian observes us and our religions externally, in masses, as thing-in-itself. But human reality is between "I alone" and "mass-object." We are in-betweens, bridges, passages to each other, neither self-contained nor bridges into an absolute void. …. If we approach religion from a merely historical point of view we are—I am quoting Hegel—like clerks in a bank registering other people's wealth. We cannot study the history of religion in the hope of becoming religious ourselves. What we become is not religious, but learned in the history of some religions. Discourses on Religion by Gustav Emil Muller 1951

His parents were Gustav Adolf Arthur Mueller (Müller) (1860 - 1923) and Therese Schwarzenbach (1862 -1956). Both of his grandfathers were also professors. Johann Müller was a professor of mathematics at Bern Gymnasium and Valentin Schwarzenbach was professor of chemistry at the University of Bern.

He married Renee Frieda Mueller (Müller) (1898 - 1992) in 1925, and they had three children.

He also wrote and published poetry and drama, and composed music. Mueller's collected papers are housed at the University of Oklahoma, Western History Collections. Hegel: The Man, His Vision, and His Work (1959) is considered to be his most important contribution.

== Books ==
=== In English ===
- The History of American Philosophy (1936),
- The Philosophy of Our Uncertainties (1936),
- What Plato Thinks" (1937)
- Philosophy and the War (1943)
- The World as Spectacle (1944)
- Education Limited (1949) - Greek Translation 1963
- Discourses on Religion (1951)
- Philosophy of Literature (1948),
- Dialectic: A Way Into and Within Philosophy (1953)
- The Interplay of Opposites (1956)
- A Dialectical Ontology (1956)
- Hegel Encyclopedia of Philosophy by Hegel, translated and annotated by G. E Mueller (1959)
- Hegel: The Man, His Vision, and His Work (1959)
- Plato, The Founder of Philosophy as Dialectic (1965)
- Origins and Dimensions of Philosophy (1965)
- Instead of a Biography (1970)

=== In German ===
- Geschichtsphilosophische Grundbegriffe bei Marx (1924)
- Americanische Philosophie (1936) - second, expanded edition in 1950
- Der Mensch im Sein (1938)
- Hegel über Offenbarung, Kirche, und Philosophie (1938)
- Hegel über Sittlichkeit und Geschichte (1939)
- Hegel: Denkgeschichte eines Lebendigen (1959)
- Dialektische Philosophie (1974)
- Zwischen Welten (1976)
- Wilhelm Busch als Philosoph (1983)
- Erlebtes Amerika (1984)
- Nachchristliches Tagebuch (1985)
- Eine Formkunst als Kunstform (1986)

=== Poetry ===
- Lese (1951)
- Nachlese (1966)
- Schwimmer im Licht (1982)
- Der Augenblick; Gedichte und Doppelreime (volume not dated)
