= Gustav Adolph Mueller =

German-American architect, engineer, and sculptor

Gustav (or Gustave) Adolph Mueller (October 14, 1864 – 1937) was a German-American architect, engineer, and sculptor active in Detroit, Michigan.

Mueller was born October 14, 1864, in Dresden, to Johanna C. and Johan G. Mueller. He was educated in Dresden, Munich and Berlin, and also served for the required period in the German army. He worked as an architect in Germany, Italy and Paris and subsequently went to Panama on the engineering for the French government. He came to Detroit in 1893, where his designs include the Cadillac Theatre, the marble altar at Saints Peter and Paul Church, and, in conjunction with Herman A. Brede, the Hurlbut Memorial Gate. He was also president of the Michigan Cigar Box Company and director of the Victor Jar Company and the American Commercial Car Company.
