= Mueller =

Mueller may refer to:

== People ==
- Mueller (surname), a surname German in origin
- Robert Mueller (1944-2026), American FBI director

== Places ==
=== Antarctica ===
- Mount Mueller (Antarctica)

=== Australia ===
- Mueller College, in Queensland
- Mount Mueller (Victoria)
- Mueller Park, in Western Australia
- Mueller River (Victoria)

=== New Zealand ===
- Mueller Glacier
- Mueller River

=== United States ===
- Mueller Bridge, near La Vernia, Texas
- Mueller Homestead, in Utica, South Dakota
- Mueller State Park, in Colorado
- Mueller Tower, in Lincoln, Nebraska
- Mueller Township, Michigan
- Robert Mueller Municipal Airport, an airport serving Austin, Texas, prior to the construction of Austin-Bergstrom International Airport
  - Mueller Community, a planned community on the former site of the airport

=== Extraterrestrial ===
- 4031 Mueller, an asteroid
- 120P/Mueller, a comet
- 136P/Mueller, a comet
- 173P/Mueller, a comet

== Companies ==
- C.F. Mueller Company, an American pasta company
- Hengeler Mueller, a German law firm
- Mueller Industries, an American manufacturing company of metal and plastic products
- Mueller Lumber Company, formerly located in Davenport, Iowa, United States
- Mueller Water Products, an American manufacturer and distributor of water infrastructure products based in Georgia
  - Mueller Co., a subsidiary based in Tennessee
  - Mueller Systems, a subsidiary based in North Carolina

== Other uses ==
- Barbier-Mueller Museum, in Geneva, Switzerland
- Mailman Mueller, a 1953 West German film
- Mueller calculus, a matrix method for manipulating Stokes vectors
- Mueller Cloth Mill, a museum in North Rhine-Westphalia, Germany
- Mueller report, officially named Report on the Investigation into Russian Interference in the 2016 Presidential Election
- Mueller, She Wrote, a podcast that debuted in 2017
- Mueller v. Allen, a 1983 United States Supreme Court case
- Mueller–Hinton agar, a microbiological growth medium
- United States v. Mueller, an 1885 United States Supreme Court case

== See also ==
- Müller (disambiguation)
