= Comet Mueller =

Comet Mueller or Mueller's Comet, may refer to any of the 15 comets discovered by American astronomer, Jean Mueller, below:

- 120P/Mueller 1
- 131P/Mueller 2
- 136P/Mueller 3
- 149P/Mueller 4
- 173P/Mueller 5
- 188P/LINEAR–Mueller
- 190P/Mueller
- C/1991 X2 (Mueller)
- C/1993 A1 (Mueller)
- C/1993 F1 (Mueller)
- C/1993 Q1 (Mueller)
- C/1994 E1 (Mueller)
- C/1997 D1 (Mueller)
- C/1997 J1 (Mueller)
- C/1998 K1 (Mueller)
