= Muller (disambiguation) =

Muller is a surname.

Muller may also refer to:

== People ==
- Muller (footballer, born 1986), Muller Santos da Silva, Brazilian football striker
- Muller (footballer, born 1990), Muller Pereira Roque, Brazilian football midfielder
- Muller (futsal player), Tomás Manga Angono (born 1998), Equatoguinean futsal player
- Muller Dinda (born 1995), Gabonese footballer
- Muller Uys (born 1998), South African rugby union player

== Other uses ==
- Muller (restaurant), Groningen, Netherlands
- Muller Frères, French glassmakers
- Muller Hill, state forest in New York, US
- Muller Ice Shelf, Antarctica
- Muller v. Oregon, a 1908 U.S. Supreme Court case concerning women's rights
- Stone and muller, a tool for mixing and grinding paint

== See also ==
- Müller (disambiguation)
- Mueller (disambiguation)
