= NGC 5335 =

Galaxy in the constellation Virgo

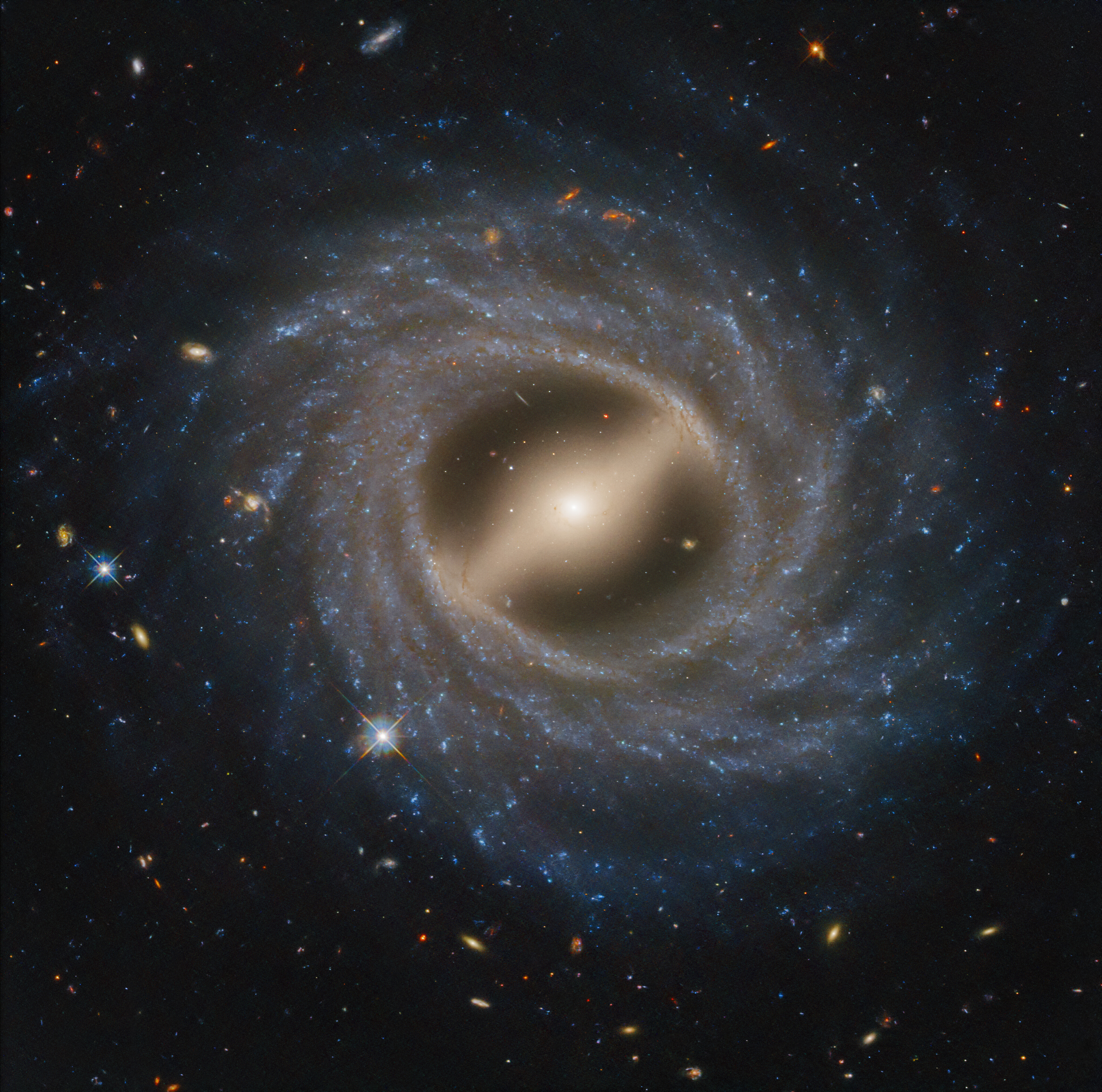
- NGC 5335 imaged by the Hubble Space Telescope

Observation data (J2000 epoch)
- Constellation: Virgo (constellation)
- Right ascension: 13^{h} 52^{m} 56.5581^{s}
- Declination: +02° 48′ 51.304″
- Redshift: 0.015451 +/- 0.000007
- Heliocentric radial velocity: 4,632±2 km/s
- Distance: 236.2 ± 16.6 Mly (72.43 ± 5.08 Mpc)
- Apparent magnitude (V): 13.8

Characteristics
- Type: SB(r)b
- Size: ~170,000 ly (52.13 kpc) (estimated)
- Apparent size (V): 1.64′ × 1.27′

Other designations
- UGC 8791, MCG +01-35-046, PGC 49310, CGCG 045-129

NGC 5335 is a barred spiral galaxy in the constellation of Virgo. Its velocity with respect to the cosmic microwave background is 4,911±20 km/s, which corresponds to a Hubble distance of 236.2 ± 16.6 Mly (72.43 ± 5.08 Mpc). It was discovered as a nebula by astronomer John Herschel on 9 April 1828.

== Type ==
NGC 5335 is classified as a flocculent spiral galaxy, distinguished by scattered star-forming regions across its disk rather than well-organized spiral arms like those in the Andromeda Galaxy. A prominent bar stretches through the galactic bulge, directing gas into the interstellar medium and stimulating thereby star formation. These bars are transient features in galaxies, evolving over timescales of approximately two billion years. They are observed in about 30% of known galaxies, including our own.

== Supernova ==
One supernova has been observed in NGC 5335. SN 1996P (Type Ia, mag. 17) was discovered by Jean Mueller on 25 March 1996.

== Image gallery ==
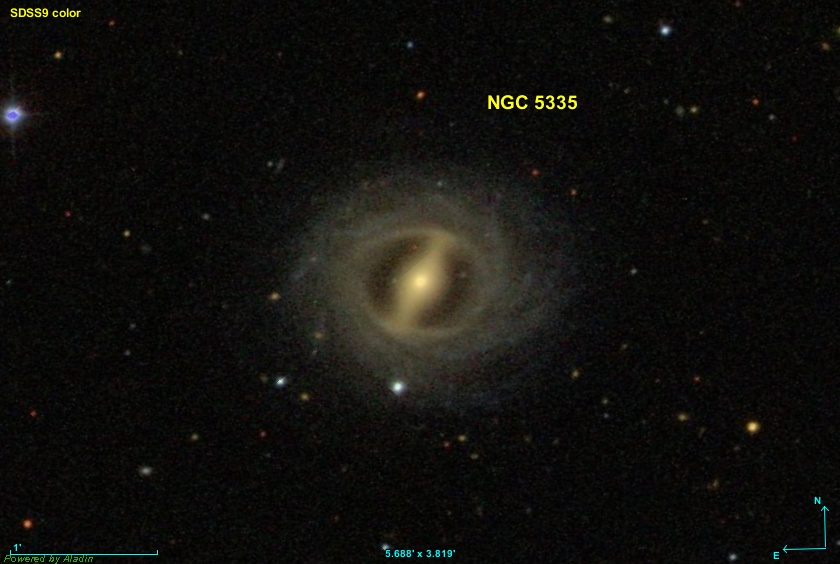
NGC 5335 imaged by SDSS

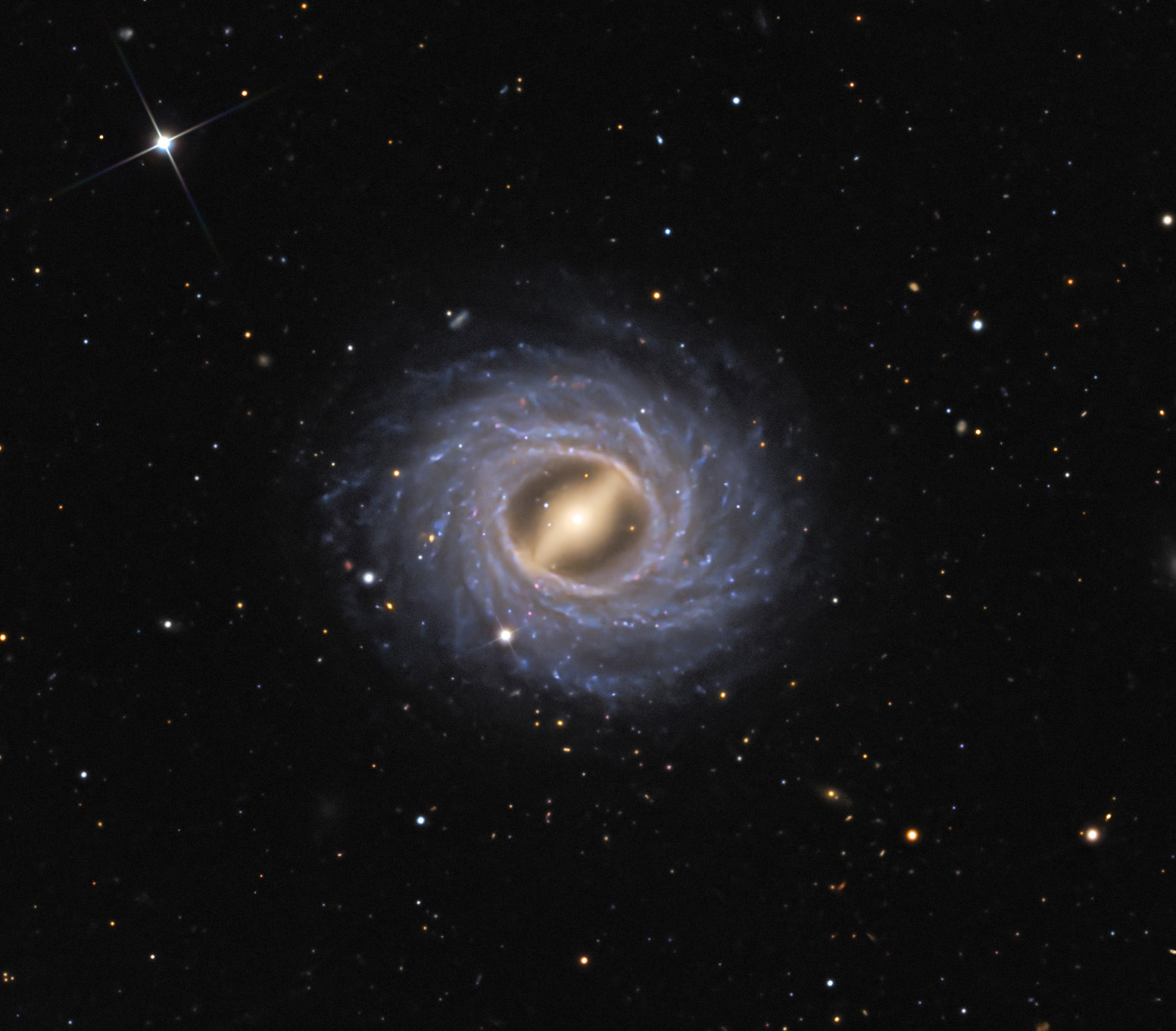
NGC 5335 imaged with a 0.6m ground-based telescope

== See also ==
- List of NGC objects (5001–6000)
