= Aurora shooting =

Aurora shooting may refer to:

- 1993 Aurora, Colorado shooting at a Chuck E. Cheese restaurant by a former employee
- 2012 Aurora theater shooting at a Colorado film screening of The Dark Knight Rises by a lone gunman
- 2019 Aurora, Illinois shooting at the Henry Pratt Company by a former employee
