= NGC 5020 =

Galaxy in the constellation Virgo

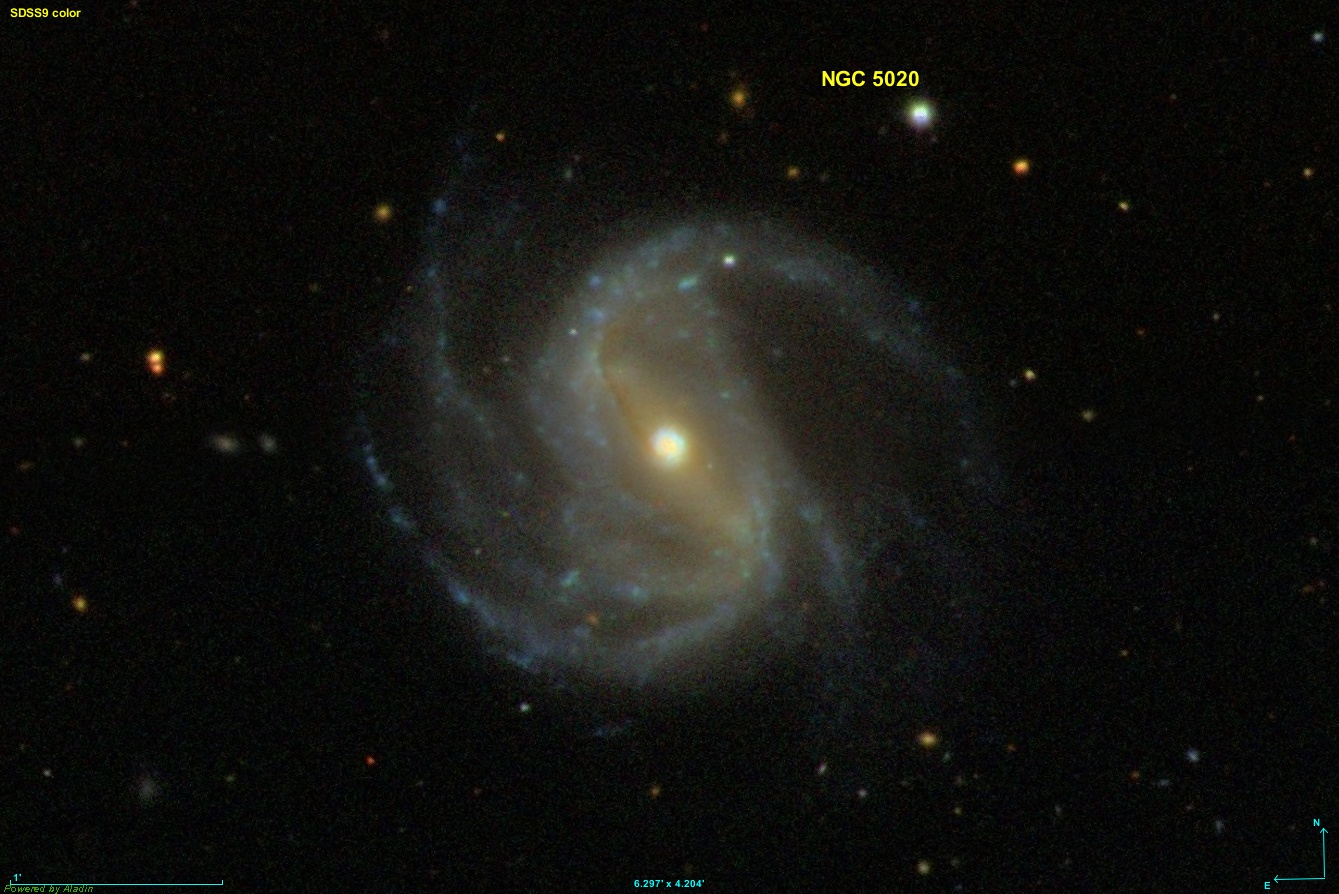
- NGC 5020 imaged by SDSS

Observation data (J2000 epoch)
- Constellation: Virgo
- Right ascension: 13^{h} 12^{m} 39.8542^{s}
- Declination: +12° 35′ 59.273″
- Redshift: 0.011214±0.00000700
- Heliocentric radial velocity: 3,362±2 km/s
- Distance: 176.2 ± 12.4 Mly (54.02 ± 3.79 Mpc)
- Group or cluster: NGC 5020 group (LGG 335)
- Apparent magnitude (V): 12.5

Characteristics
- Type: SAB(rs)bc
- Size: ~181,400 ly (55.62 kpc) (estimated)
- Apparent size (V): 3.2′ × 2.7′

Other designations
- IRAS 13102+1251, UGC 8289, MCG +02-34-003, PGC 45883, CGCG 072-024

NGC 5020 is a barred spiral galaxy in the constellation of Virgo. Its velocity with respect to the cosmic microwave background is 3,663±21 km/s, which corresponds to a Hubble distance of 176.2 ± 12.4 Mly (54.02 ± 3.79 Mpc). It was discovered by German-British astronomer William Herschel on 12 April 1784.

NGC 5020 is an active galaxy nucleus candidate, i.e. it has a compact region at the center of a galaxy that emits a significant amount of energy across the electromagnetic spectrum, with characteristics indicating that this luminosity is not produced by the stars.

== NGC 5020 group ==
According to A.M. Garcia, NGC 5020 is the largest and brightest galaxy in a group of galaxies that bears its name, the NGC 5020 group (also known as LGG 335). The other two galaxies in the group are UGC 8253 and UGC 8255.

== Supernovae ==
Two supernovae have been observed in NGC 5020:

- SN 1991J (Type II, mag. 17) was discovered by Jean Mueller on 19 February 1991.
- SN 2015D (Type II-P, mag. 17.5) was discovered by Zhangwei Jin and Xing Gao on 18 January 2015.

== See also ==
- List of NGC objects (5001–6000)
