= UGC 11861 =

Galaxy in the constellation Cepheus

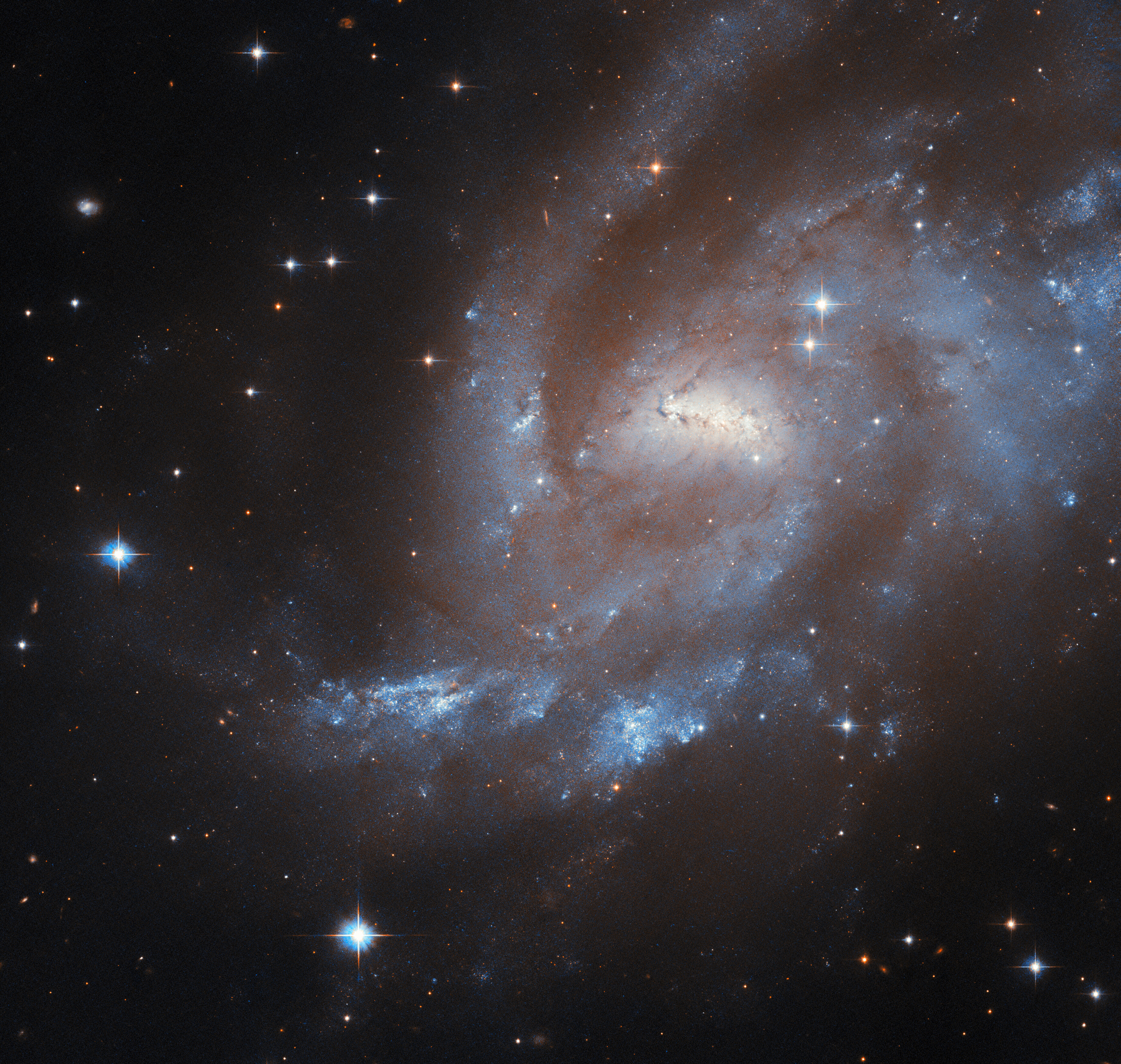
- The barred spiral galaxy UGC 11861, imaged by the Hubble Space Telescope

Observation data (J2000 epoch)
- Constellation: Cepheus
- Right ascension: 21^{h} 56^{m} 24.3586^{s}
- Declination: +73° 15′ 37.733″
- Redshift: 0.004930
- Heliocentric radial velocity: 1478 ± 1 km/s
- Distance: 64.2 ± 4.5 Mly (19.68 ± 1.39 Mpc)
- Apparent magnitude (V): 15.2

Characteristics
- Type: SABdm
- Size: ~94,300 ly (28.91 kpc) (estimated)
- Apparent size (V): 3.5′ × 2.6′

Other designations
- IRAS 21557+7301, 2MASX J21562414+7315393, PGC 67671, CGCG 343-003

UGC 11861 is a barred spiral galaxy in the constellation of Cepheus. Its velocity with respect to the cosmic microwave background is 1334 ± 10 km/s, which corresponds to a Hubble distance of 19.68 ± 1.39 Mpc (~64.2 million light-years). In addition, three non redshift measurements give a distance of 18.933 ± 5.26 Mpc (~61.7 million light-years). The first known reference to this galaxy comes from volume IV of the Catalogue of Galaxies and of Clusters of Galaxies compiled by Fritz Zwicky in 1968, where it was listed as CGCG 343-003, and described as an "extremely diffuse spiral".

The SIMBAD database lists UGC 11861 as an active galaxy nucleus candidate, i.e. it has a compact region at the center that emits a significant amount of energy across the electromagnetic spectrum, with characteristics indicating that this luminosity is not produced by the stars. In addition, the galaxy contains two broad spiral arms wrapping around its central region.

== Supernovae ==
Three supernovae have been observed in UGC 11861:

- SN 1995ag (Type II, mag. 17) was discovered by Jean Mueller on 28 September 1995.
- SN 1997db (Type II, mag. 16.9) was discovered by Michael Schwartz on 2 August 1997.
- SN 2011dm (Type Ia, mag. 18.8) was discovered by the Lick Observatory Supernova Search (LOSS) on 15 June 2011.
