= SN 1996ah =

Supernova in the spiral galaxy NGC 5640

- Event type: Supernova
- type Ia
- Constellation: Camelopardalis
- Right ascension: 14^{h} 20^{m} 39.02^{s}
- Declination: +80° 07' 21.00"
- Epoch: J2000.0
- Distance: 660 Mly
- Notable features: located in the host galaxy NGC 5640
- Peak apparent magnitude: approx. 18.00

SN 1996ah was a supernova located in the spiral galaxy NGC 5640 in the constellation of Camelopardalis. It was discovered on June 6, 1996, by American astronomer Jean Mueller, who was using the 1.2-m Oschin Schmidt telescope in the course of the second Palomar Sky Survey.

SN 1996ah had magnitude about 18 and was located 5" west and 1" south of the center of NGC 5640. It was classified as type Ia supernova.

== See also ==
- Supernova
- NGC 5640
- Camelopardalis (constellation)
