= NGC 5640 =

Galaxy in the constellation Camelopardalis

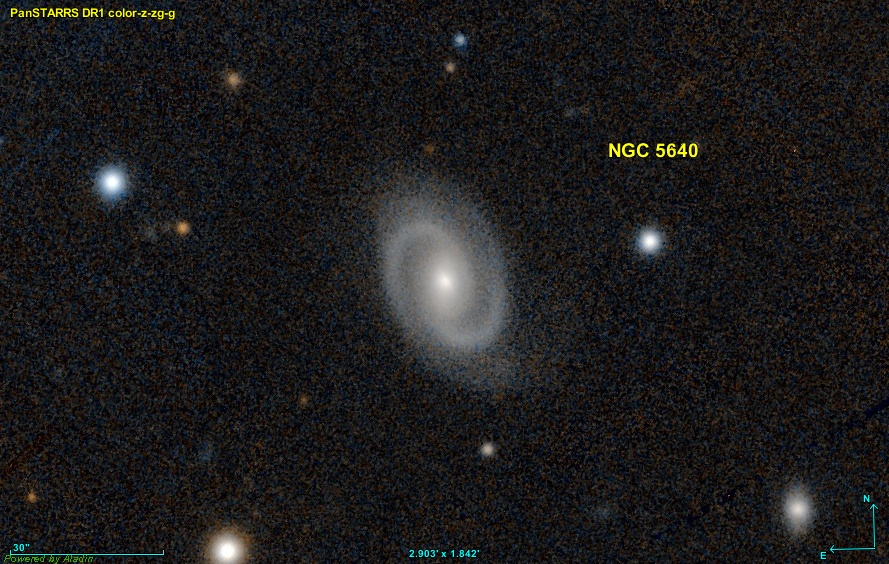
- NGC 5640 (Pan-STARRS)

Observation data (J2000.0 epoch)
- Constellation: Camelopardalis
- Right ascension: 14^{h} 20^{m} 40.81^{s}
- Declination: +80° 07′ 23.20″
- Redshift: 0.047386
- Heliocentric radial velocity: 14206 ± 35 km/s
- Distance: 660 Mly
- Apparent magnitude (V): 14.70
- Apparent magnitude (B): 15.60

Characteristics
- Type: Sa
- Apparent size (V): 0.9 x 0.4

Other designations
- PGC 51263, CGCG 353.35

NGC 5640 is a spiral galaxy approximately 660 million light-years away from Earth in the constellation of Camelopardalis. It was discovered by British astronomer William Herschel on December 20, 1797.

== Supernova SN 1996ah ==
Supernova SN 1996ah was discovered in NGC 5640 on June 6, 1996 by Jean Mueller, who was using the 1.2-m Oschin Schmidt telescope in the course of the second Palomar Sky Survey.

SN 1996ah had magnitude about 18 and was located southwest of the centre of NGC 5640 (coordinates: RA 14h20m39.020s, DEC +80d07m21.00s, J2000.0). It was classified as Type Ia supernova.

== See also ==
- List of NGC objects (5001–6000)
