= Mount Mueller =

Mount Mueller may refer to the following mountains:

- Mount Mueller (Antarctica), in Enderby Land
- Mount Mueller (Tasmania), a feature in the geology of Tasmania, Australia
- Mount Mueller (Victoria), Australia
