= NGC 1164 =

Galaxy in the constellation Perseus

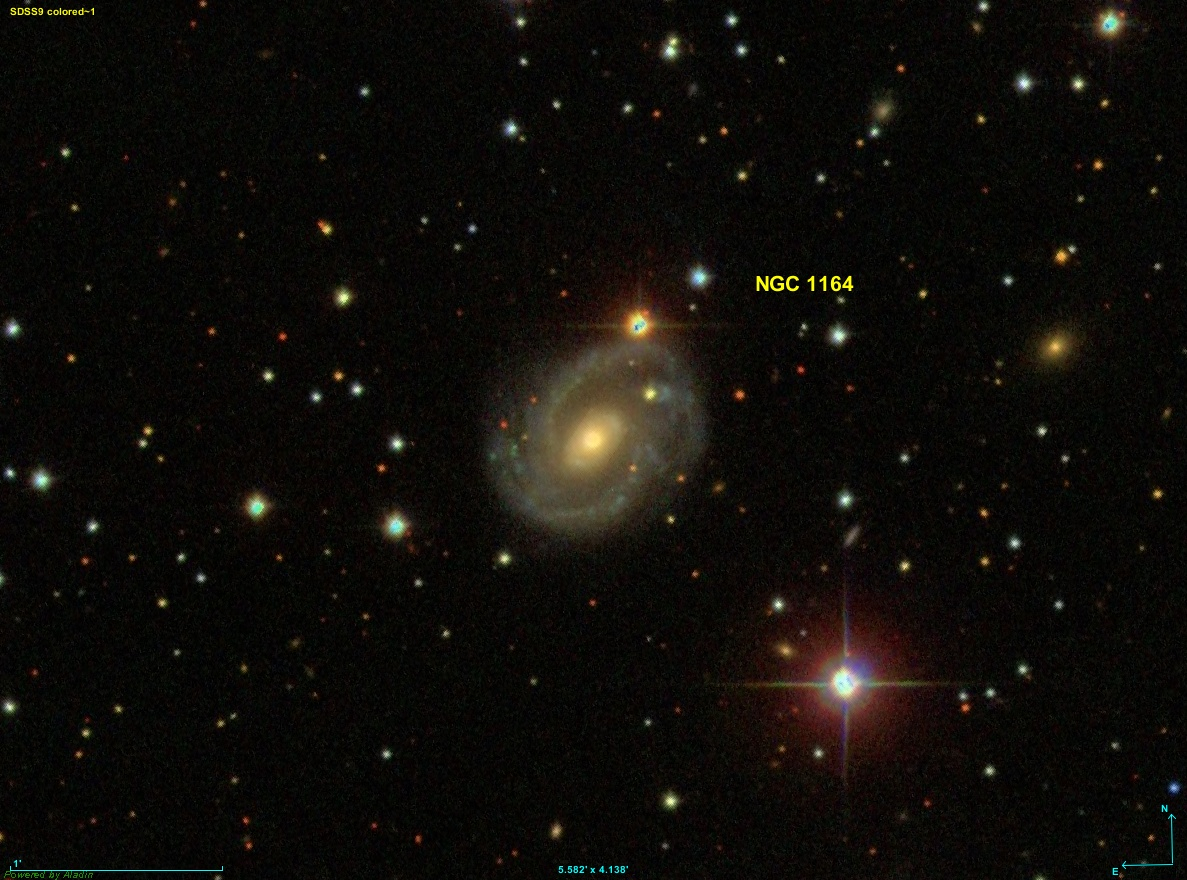
- NGC 1164 (Sloan Digital Sky Survey)

Observation data (J2000.0 epoch)
- Constellation: Perseus
- Right ascension: 03^{h} 01^{m} 59.84^{s}
- Declination: +42° 35′ 05.8″
- Redshift: 0.013926
- Heliocentric radial velocity: 4175±10 km/s
- Distance: 59 Mpc
- Apparent magnitude (V): ~13
- Apparent magnitude (B): 14.4

Characteristics
- Type: (R')SAB(s)ab
- Apparent size (V): 102.70"

Other designations
- PGC 11441, MCG+07-07-016, UGC 2490

NGC 1164 is a barred spiral galaxy located in the constellation Perseus, approximately 60 million parsecs from Earth. It was discovered by the astronomer John Herschel in 1828. NGC 1164 is classified as a (R')SAB(s)ab type spiral galaxy, with a prominent central bar structure and well-defined spiral arms.

== Supernovae ==
Two supernovae have been observed in NGC 1164:

- SN 1993ab (Type Ia, mag. 18) was discovered by Jean Mueller on 24 September 1993.
- SN 2016hsr (Type II, mag. 18.5) was discovered by the Lick Observatory Supernova Search (LOSS) on 2 November 2016.

== See also ==
- List of NGC objects
- List of galaxies
