= Mayor Müller =

Mayor Müller may refer to:

- Andreas Müller (politician), interim mayor of Leipzig, Germany
- Carl Wilhelm Müller, mayor of Leipzig, Electorate of Saxony
- Eduard Müller (Swiss politician) (1848–1919), mayor of Bern, Switzerland
- Frederik Ernst Müller, mayor of Rotterdam, Netherlands
- Georg Müller-Jürgens (born Georg Müller, 1883–1971), mayor of Jever, Germany
- Gustav Müller (politician), mayor of Bern, Switzerland
- Johannes Müller (politician, born 1880) (1880–1964), mayor of Marburg, Germany
- Karl-Heinz Müller (politician), mayor of Leipzig, Germany
- Helmut Müller (born 1952), mayor of Wiesbaden, Germany
- Hermann Müller (politician, born 1935) (1935–2013), mayor of Idstein, Germany
- Michael Müller (politician, born 1964), mayor of Berlin, Germany
- Nikolaus Müller (1892–1980), mayor of Augsburg, Germany
- Otto Thott Fritzner Müller (1864–1944), mayor of Halden, Norway
- Peter Müller (mayor), mayor of Windhoek, South West Africa
- Pierre Muller (1952–2022), mayor of Geneva, Switzerland

== See also ==
- Mayor Miller (disambiguation)
- Mayor Mueller (disambiguation)
- Müller (disambiguation)
