= Mayor Mueller =

Mayor Mueller may refer to:

- James Mueller (Indiana politician) (born 1982), mayor of South Bend, Indiana, United States
- Mayor Max II (Maximus Mighty-Dog Mueller II, 2013–2022), mayor of Idyllwild–Pine Cove, California, United States

== See also ==
- Mayor Miller (disambiguation)
- Mayor Müller (disambiguation)
- Mueller (disambiguation)
