= Mayor Miller =

Mayor Miller may refer to:

== United States ==
- Alexander Lawton Miller, mayor of Macon, Georgia
- George Miller (Arizona politician) (1922–2014), mayor of Tucson, Arizona
- Harriet Miller (politician) (1919–2010), mayor of Santa Barbara, California
- James F. Miller, mayor of New Orleans, Louisiana
- James Miller (Newark politician), mayor of Newark, New Jersey
- John F. Miller (Ann Arbor mayor), mayor of Ann Arbor, Michigan
- John Franklin Miller (Washington politician) (1862–1936), mayor of Seattle, Washington
- Laura Miller (politician) (born 1958), mayor of Dallas, Texas
- Lester Miller, mayor of Macon, Georgia
- Lorin Miller (1800–1888), mayor of Omaha, Nebraska
- Matt Miller (mayor), mayor of Ashland, Ohio
- Pam Miller, mayor of Lexington, Kentucky
- R. Burnett Miller, mayor of Sacramento, California
- Ray T. Miller (1893–1966), mayor of Cleveland, Ohio
- Richard P. Miller Jr., mayor of Oneonta, New York
- Robert Thomas Miller (1893–1962), mayor of Austin, Texas
- Victor J. Miller (1888–1955), mayor of St. Louis, Missouri
- Wallace Miller (American politician), mayor of Macon, Georgia
- William Miller (mayor) (1821–1901), mayor of South Bend, Indiana

== Other ==
- David Miller (Canadian politician) (born 1958), mayor of Toronto, Canada
- George Clark Miller, (1882–1968), mayor of Vancouver, Canada
- James Miller (builder) (1905–1971), lord mayor of London, United Kingdom
- John Miller (New Zealand politician) (1869–1938), mayor of Invercargill, New Zealand

== See also ==
- Mayor Mueller (disambiguation)
- Mayor Müller (disambiguation)
- Miller (surname)
