= 4257 Ubasti =

Near-Earth asteroid

Discovery
- Discovered by: J. E. Mueller
- Discovery site: Palomar Obs.
- Discovery date: 23 August 1987

Designations
- Named after: Bastet (Egyptian goddess of cats)
- Alternative designations: 1987 QA
- Minor planet category: NEO · Apollo; Mars-crosser

Orbital characteristics
- Epoch 4 September 2017 (JD 2458000.5)
- Uncertainty parameter 0
- Observation arc: 29.02 yr (10,600 days)
- Aphelion: 2.4183 AU
- Perihelion: 0.8759 AU
- Semi-major axis: 1.6471 AU
- Eccentricity: 0.4682
- Orbital period (sidereal): 2.11 yr (772 days)
- Mean anomaly: 28.670°
- Mean motion: 0° 27^{m} 58.32^{s} / day
- Inclination: 40.716°
- Longitude of ascending node: 169.22°
- Argument of perihelion: 278.92°
- Earth MOID: 0.1714 AU · 66.8 LD

Physical characteristics
- Dimensions: 1.30±0.09 km 1.96 km (calculated)
- Geometric albedo: 0.20 (assumed); 0.376±0.053
- Spectral type: S
- Absolute magnitude (H): 15.9 · 16.20

4257 Ubasti, provisional designation 1987 QA, is a stony asteroid, classified as near-Earth object of the Apollo group and as Mars-crosser, approximately 1.5 kilometers in diameter. It was discovered by American astronomer Jean Mueller at the Palomar Observatory in California on 23 August 1987. The asteroid was named for Bastet – also known as Baast, Ubaste or Ubasti – the Egyptian goddess of cats.

== Orbit and classification ==
Ubasti orbits the Sun at a distance of 0.9–2.4 AU once every 2 years and 1 month (772 days). Its orbit has an eccentricity of 0.47 and an inclination of 41° with respect to the ecliptic. Due to its high eccentricity, Ubasti is also a Mars-crossing asteroid. The body's observation arc begins with its official discovery observation, as no precoveries were taken and no prior identification had been made.

=== Close approaches ===
As a near-Earth object, Ubasti has a low Earth minimum orbital intersection distance of 0.1714 AU (25,600,000 km), which corresponds to 66.8 lunar distances (LD). This distance, however, is too large to make it a potentially hazardous asteroid (0.05 AU; less than 20 LD).

== Physical characteristics ==
Ubasti is an assumed stony S-type asteroid.

=== Rotation period ===
As of 2017, no rotational lightcurve of Ubasti has been obtained and its rotation period remains unknown. However, the Lowell Observatory Near-Earth Asteroid Photometric Survey has measured the body's brightness variation caused by its rotation, which gave a maximum of 0.36 magnitude. This indicates that the body has a somewhat non-spherical shape.

=== Diameter and albedo ===
According to the survey carried out by the Japanese Akari satellite, Ubasti measures 1.30 kilometers in diameter and its surface has an albedo of 0.376, while the Collaborative Asteroid Lightcurve Link assumes a standard albedo for stony asteroids of 0.20 and calculates a diameter of 1.96 kilometers based on an absolute magnitude of 15.9.

== Naming ==
This minor planet was named after Egyptian goddesses Bastet, who was originally the goddess of warfare, equated with the lioness war goddess, but later transformed into a major protector deity represented as a cat. The official naming citation was published by the Minor Planet Center on 21 November 1991 (M.P.C. 19336). The discoverer dedicated this asteroid to her beloved companion, Pepper Cat (1974–1991).
