= Echologics =

Canadian engineering company

Echologics LLC
- Industry: Water infrastructure
- Founded: 2003
- Founder: Marc Bracken
- Headquarters: Toronto, Ontario, Canada
- Area served: Worldwide
- Key people: Marietta Zakas (President and CEO) Adam Donnely (VP Smart Water Infrastructure) Kanishk Noel (Director of Products)
- Products: EchoShore-TX; EchoShore-DX; EchoWave; ePulse; LeakFinderST
- Services: Pipe condition assessment; Leak detection; pressure management; Fixed Leak Detection Systems
- Number of employees: 80-100
- Parent: Mueller Water Products, Inc.
- Website: echologics.com

Echologics LLC is a Canadian engineering company based in Toronto founded by Marc Bracken as a spinout from Aercoustics Engineering Limited that specializes in non-invasive acoustic detection of underground leaks and pipe condition assessment. It has completed projects in North America, Europe, Australia, South Africa, and Singapore that have minimized the loss of millions of gallons of drinking water via leaking infrastructure. Echologics and Mueller Systems are both part of Mueller Water Products' Mueller Technologies reporting segment.

== Products and Services ==
Echologics specializes in utilizing acoustic technology for leak detection in underground plastic piping, eliminating the need for direct pipe access. In 2010, the company won a one-year contract to detect leaks in municipal piping in the City of New Orleans after Hurricane Katrina. During the initial two weeks of the project, Echologics successfully identified leaks amounting to 358,000 gallons daily. Echologics has continued this relationship to present day and finds approximately 490 leaks for New Orleans per year.

Other services include assessment of asbestos cement pipes, permanent leak monitoring systems, transmission main leak detection, and non-revenue water management. In 2012, Mueller Service Co., which provides assessment and remediation services to water utilities, was consolidated under the Echologics brand.

== Projects ==
=== Water Transmission Main in Las Vegas ===
Echologics is monitoring a three-mile section of a critical water main beneath the Las Vegas Strip for the Las Vegas Valley Water District (LVVWD). Installed in 1963, the 30-inch water main supplies up to 7.5 million gallons of water per day to resorts, casinos, and attractions, among other users. LVVWD is deploying Echologics' EchoShore-TX leak detection platform.

=== Bottling Plant in China ===
Echologics located a leak under a bottling plant in China, which was losing approximately 40,000 gallons per day of treated supply water. An Echologics field crew with the LeakFinder correlator located the leak, underneath a section of concrete roadway surrounding the plant.

=== Partnership with American Water and Illinois Sustainable Technology Center ===
The Illinois Sustainable Technology Center collaborated with American Water and Echologics to conduct leak detection initiatives in the Chicago Metropolitan area, resulting in a conservation of 3.25 million gallons of non-revenue water.

=== City of Tampa Water Department ===
The City of Tampa Water Department secured a service agreement with Echologics in April 2012 to conduct widespread transmission main leak detection on approximately 7.5 miles of cast iron pipe in the city's water system.

=== United Water New Jersey ===
United Water New Jersey (UWNJ), a subsidiary of United Water, selected Echologics for a pilot survey to detect leaks in five miles of water mains composed of cast iron pipe, pre-stressed cylinder concrete, and reinforced concrete pipe.
