= Karl Müller (astronomer) =

Czech astronomist (1866–1942)

Karl Müller (22 August 1866 – 23 October 1942) was an Austrian government official and amateur astronomer.

He was born in Františkovy Lázně, Bohemia, Austrian Empire and died in Vienna, Austria. He collaborated with Mary Adela Blagg on standardizing the nomenclature of formations on the Moon for the Lunar Commission of the newly formed International Astronomical Union. Together with Blagg he produced a two volume set in 1935, entitled Named Lunar Formations, that became the standard reference on the subject.

The Müller crater on the Moon is named after him.
