= 121P/Shoemaker–Holt =

Jupiter-family comet

121P/Shoemaker-Holt
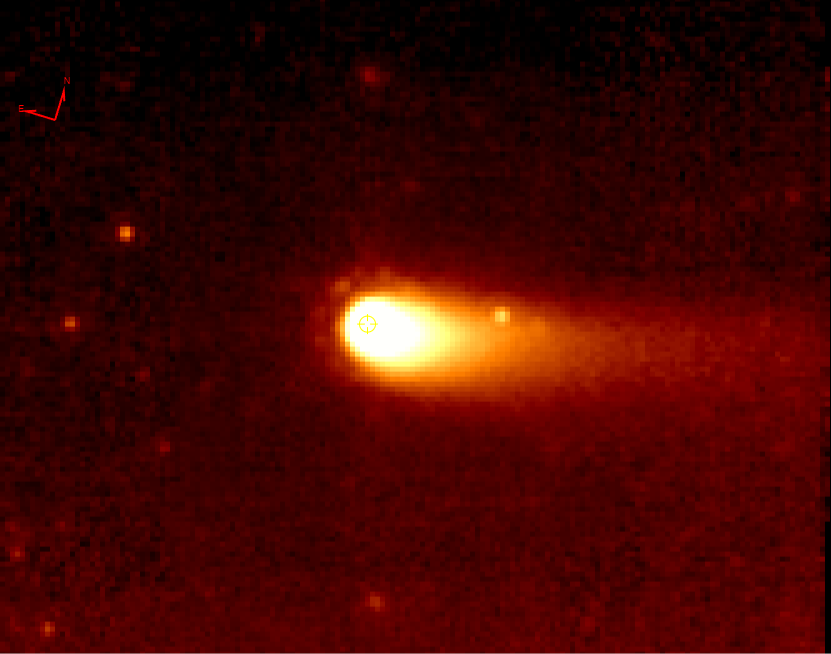
- Infrared image of Comet Shoemaker–Holt from the Spitzer Space Telescope on 1 August 2006

Discovery
- Discovered by: Carolyn S. Shoemaker; Eugene Merle Shoemaker; Henry E. Holt
- Discovery date: 9 March 1989

Designations
- MPC designation: P/1989 E2, P/1995 Q3
- Alternative designations: Shoemaker–Holt 2; 1988 XI, 1989j

Orbital characteristics
- Epoch: 21 November 2025 (JD 2461000.5)
- Observation arc: 37.19 years
- Earliest precovery date: 4 March 1989
- Number of observations: 798
- Aphelion: 5.448 AU
- Perihelion: 3.733 AU
- Semi-major axis: 4.591 AU
- Eccentricity: 0.18669
- Orbital period: 9.835 years
- Inclination: 20.162°
- Longitude of ascending node: 94.104°
- Argument of periapsis: 12.047°
- Mean anomaly: 87.563°
- Last perihelion: 28 June 2023
- Next perihelion: 5 May 2033
- T_{Jupiter}: 2.858
- Earth MOID: 2.620 AU
- Jupiter MOID: 0.131 AU

Physical characteristics
- Mean radius: 3.61 km (2.24 mi)
- Mean density: 470±90 kg/m^{3}
- Synodic rotation period: ~10 hours
- Spectral type: (V–R) = 0.53±0.03
- Comet total magnitude (M1): 6.7
- Comet nuclear magnitude (M2): 12.6

121P/Shoemaker–Holt, also known as Shoemaker–Holt 2, is a Jupiter-family comet with an orbital period of about 10 years. The comet was discovered by Carolyn S. Shoemaker, Eugene M. Shoemaker, and Henry E. Holt on 9 March 1989. The comet then had an apparent magnitude of 13, was diffuse and had a tail about 2 arcminutes long. It was recovered by James V. Scotti on 29 August 1995 in images obtained as part of the Spacewatch survey.

The nucleus of the comet is estimated to have a radius of 3.87 km based on infrared imaging by the Spitzer Space Telescope, when the comet displayed dust emission. Observations of the comet from the Isaac Newton Telescope indicate an effective radius of 3.61 kilometers. The rotational period was calculated to be 10 hours, but with high uncertainty.

Numbered comets
Previous; 120P/Mueller	121P/Shoemaker–Holt	Next; 122P/de Vico
