= Mueller Co. =

American industrial manufacturing group

- Industry: Water Infrastructure
- Founded: 1857
- Founder: Hieronymus Mueller
- Headquarters: Chattanooga, Tennessee, United States
- Revenue: $783.3 million (2014)
- Parent: Mueller Water Products, Inc.
- Website: www.muellercompany.com

Mueller Co. is a Chattanooga, Tennessee-based industrial manufacturing group that manufactures fire hydrants, gate valves, and other water distribution products. Mueller Co. – which moved there from Decatur, Illinois, in 2010 – is the largest supplier of potable water distribution products in North America.

== History ==
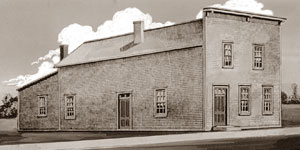
The gun shop, c. 1859

Mueller Co. was founded in 1857 by Hieronymus Mueller as "H. Mueller, Gun Shop". Mueller closed the business briefly in 1858 to prospect for gold in Colorado, but returned to his business not long after, expanding it to include sewing machine and clock repairs and the sale of hunting and fishing equipment in addition to gunsmithing. By 1880, the focus of Mueller's business shifted from manufacturing guns to manufacturing plumbing goods, and in 1885, Mueller changed the name of his business to "H. Mueller Manufacturing Co." and he moved the gun and sporting goods division of his company to a separate location. By 1891, Mueller ran three separate businesses: a plumbing services shop, a plumbing goods manufacturing company, and a gun sporting goods store. In 1896, Mueller's manufacturing business had grown so much, the family sold its gun and sporting goods business in order to focus entirely on producing plumbing goods.

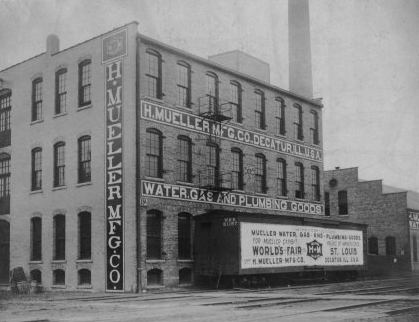

Mueller Co.'s previous headquarters location in Decatur started as a two-story brick building constructed in 1895 and was gradually expanded to include a third story, another three-story office building and warehouse, a power plant, a soda fountain manufacturing plant, an engineering building, galvanizing facilities, and a gym, among others. By 1960, the campus consisted of more than a dozen buildings occupying six city blocks. Around 1910, the youngest Mueller brother, Oscar, moved to New York in order to establish and run Mueller Manufacturing's Eastern Division manufacturing and sales office, resulting in a sharp increase in the business the company did in Canada. In 1912, Oscar Mueller moved again in order to establish a new manufacturing plant in Sarnia, Ontario under the name Mueller, Ltd.

During World War I the Mueller brothers formed Mueller Metals Company in order to address the shortage of brass rod munitions fuses, constructing a plant in Port Huron, Michigan. The plant went into production as the war was ending, and the Muellers took a large loss on the facility. In 1927, Oscar Mueller exchanged his interest in Mueller Co. for the Port Huron plant, converting it into an independent brass tubing and fitting manufacturing enterprise under the name of Mueller Brass Company, now known as Mueller Industries.

Throughout the late 1920s, Mueller Co. opened additional sales and distribution offices in Los Angeles, Chicago, San Francisco, Dallas, and Atlanta, though the Great Depression led to the closure of all of these offices. However, a production plant was opened in Los Angeles in 1933 in order to handle distribution for the company's still-growing market in the western United States. The Los Angeles plant remained in operation until 1977, when it was replaced by a new facility in Brea, California. Mueller Co. also acquired Columbia Iron Works, a Chattanooga, Tennessee-based manufacturer of hydrants and gate valves in 1933.

Mueller Co. opened a plant to produce a full line of bathroom and kitchen fixtures in 1925, but the Depression caused a decline in demand for these goods, leading to the plant's closure in 1933. It reopened as a Mueller Co.-owned munitions plant during World War II, manufacturing 37mm and 57mm shells and large naval ordinance. During this time, Mueller developed an armor-piercing shell that was used in North Africa to defeat the Axis forces led by Erwin Rommel. The plant closed at the end of the war, and the property was sold in 1948.

In 1951, the company purchased a new site in Decatur and converted it to an iron and brass foundry. The iron foundry operation was phased out within a few years, and the facility is now one of the largest brass foundries in the world. The central Decatur campus went through a major modernization beginning in 1961, bringing most of the facility's operations under a single roof. Many of the older buildings were either sold or demolished, but several of the oldest structures were kept and incorporated into the new plant building. A new iron foundry opened in St. Jerome, Quebec under Mueller, Ltd. in 1966. Mueller opened a plant in Clinton, South Carolina to manufacture butterfly valves in 1980, but ceased operation in 1996 after the acquisition of Henry Pratt Company. In 1996, Mueller opened a plant that produces gas distribution products in Brownsville, Texas. The corporate headquarters of the company relocated from Decatur to Chattanooga, Tennessee in 2010.

=== 2021 Mueller Co. Shooting ===
On June 15, 2021 at 2:22 AM, an employee at the Mueller Co. plant in Albertville, Alabama walked into the plant armed with a handgun and opened fire on an unknown number of people. At 2:30 AM, emergency services received the first call of the shooting. At approximately 2:32 AM, first responders began arriving on scene. By 2:35 AM, police had made entry into the plant searching for the shooter, and began evacuating employees. Authorities discovered 4 victims in different parts of the plant and immediately began performing cardiopulmonary resuscitation (CPR) and other life saving measures on the victims. At 2:53 AM, an ambulance arrived and transported one victim to hospital, and another one half an hour later. The two other victims were fatally wounded and died on scene. Police initially thought that it was still an active shooter situation for half an hour before they realized the shooter was no longer in the plant. At approximately 6:00 AM, police located the suspect's body in neighboring Guntersville, Alabama, having died by suicide. The investigation is still ongoing and a motive for the attack has not been established.

== Acquisitions and mergers ==
In 1923, Mueller Co. acquired the National Casting Company and established the Mueller Iron Foundry Company. The iron foundry became part of Mueller Co. in 1928, and continued operation until the mid-1950s. Mueller Co. acquired Chattanooga, Tennessee-based Columbia Iron Works, a manufacturer of fire hydrants and gate valves, in 1933, later changing the outfit's brand name to Mueller in 1955. Mueller still manufactures gate valves at this location, but the fire hydrant manufacturing operation was moved to Albertville, Alabama in 1975, earning the town the moniker "Fire Hydrant Capital of the World" in 1991. In 1965, Mueller Co. bought the Los Angeles-based Adams Clamp Company and moved its production operations first to Decatur, Illinois, and later to its current location in Cleveland, Tennessee. In 1988, Mueller Co. acquired Hersey-Sparling Meter Company, which began operating under its former name, Hersey Meters, until it was merged with Arkion Systems in 2009 and became known as Mueller Systems. In 1996, Henry Pratt Company, a manufacturer of butterfly and other specialty valves, and James Jones Company became subsidiaries of Mueller Co. Pratt subsequently acquired several companies between 2001 and 2003, including Hydro Gate and Milliken Valve, among others. The leak detection company, Echologics, and Hydro Guard, a brand of water line flushing systems, are Mueller Co.'s most recent acquisitions; they both became divisions of the company in 2011.

== Brands and subsidiaries ==
Name	Description
Echologics	Echologics specializes in non-invasive acoustic detection of underground leaks and pipe condition assessment. It has conducted and completed projects in North America, Europe, Australia, South Africa, and Singapore that have mitigated the loss of millions of gallons of drinking water via leaking infrastructure. In 2012, Mueller Service Co., which also provides assessment and remediation services for water utilities, was consolidated under the Echologics brand.
Henry Pratt Company	The Henry Pratt Company develops, manufactures and sells valves, valve actuators and control systems for use in potable water, wastewater, power, industrial, and nuclear applications. The company was founded in 1901 as a metal fabricating shop, and it designed and developed the first rubber-seated butterfly valve in 1926. The company is headquartered in Aurora, Illinois, with manufacturing facilities in Aurora, Illinois, and Hammond, Indiana.
Hydro Gate	Hydro Gate provides water control gates for multiple industries and applications including flood control, water treatment, irrigation, dam projects, and hydroelectricity. Its products include cast iron and fabricated slide or flap gates, rectangular butterfly gates, stop logs, wall thimbles, lifts, and accessories.
Hydro-Guard	Hydro-Guard provides automatic, schedulable flushing systems for water distribution lines.
James Jones Company	James Jones Company manufactures bronze wet barrel fire hydrants, and a variety of bronze water service valves and fittings for potable water distribution systems. The company was founded in the early 1890s by James Jones, and expanded from primarily manufacturing bronze valves to also manufacturing bronze fire hydrants in 1926. The company's administrative headquarters are located in Ontario, California, and it has ISO2001-compliant manufacturing facilities located in Illinois, Tennessee, and Alabama.
Milliken Valve Co.	Milliken Valve Co. develops, manufacturers, and sells plug, check, and butterfly valves, as well as related water, wastewater, and industrial controls and actuators. In 2011, the Occupational Safety and Health Administration awarded Milliken with its "Star" worksite designation, recognizing its implementation of an effective health and safety management system.
Mueller Systems	Mueller Systems is a manufacturer and distributor of advanced metering infrastructure (AMI) and automatic meter reading (AMR) technology, as well as residential, commercial and fire-line meters and related products. Founded as Hawes and Hersey Company in 1859, Mueller Systems is the oldest manufacturer of water meters in the United States.
U.S. Pipe Valve & Hydrant Division	U.S. Pipe Valve and Hydrant Division (USPVH) produces fire hydrants and gate valves, as well as a variety of other potable water flow control products for water distribution systems and fire protection. USPVH products are manufactured in the company's plants, which are ISO9001-certified and located in the United States.

== Research and development ==
In 2012, Mueller Co. expanded its research and development capabilities with the creation of the Mueller Co. Technology Center (MTC) in Chattanooga, Tennessee. The MTC combined existing R&D facilities in Chattanooga with operations that were relocated from a Rhode Island facility and from several manufacturing facilities. The decision to consolidate Mueller's R&D activities in Chattanooga was intended to improve communications between researchers and manufacturers within the company.

== Technologies ==
Technologies developed and improved by Mueller Co. and its subsidiaries throughout its history are used in and have improved infrastructures around the world. United States Patent #251726A was issued to Hieronymus Mueller in 1892 for a water pressure regulator. In 1913, modified versions of this valve were used to keep ships from accidentally running into the gates of the Panama Canal. Today, as many as 95 valves based on Mueller's original design are still used to protect the canal's system of locks. Pressure regulators are also considered vital components of plumbing and water infrastructure systems, as they are instrumental in protecting pipes from wear-and-tear caused by pressure fluctuations, preventing leaks caused by pressure that is too high, and protecting the drinking water supply by preventing contamination caused by untreated groundwater when pressure is too low.

More recently, a technological collaboration between Mueller Co. subsidiaries, Mueller Systems and Echologics, has resulted in the development of the first continual, two-way, remote leak detection and monitoring system, called Mi.Echo. Mi.Echo combines Mueller Systems' Mueller Infrastructure Network (Mi.Net), a two-way advanced metering infrastructure, with Echologics' compact, non-invasive, acoustic leak detection system, LeakFinderRT. The largest installation of the system to date is by West Virginia American Water, which covers several towns stretching 10 miles down the Kanawha Valley River.

== Sustainability ==
Mueller Co. uses a number of sustainable manufacturing and business practices. It is among the leading manufacturers in the use of the lost-foam casting process, which reduces the amount of required materials for casting and reduces the amount of waste and emissions generated by the casting process. Mueller Co. has also been a member of the Lost Foam Casting Consortium at the University of Alabama Birmingham, which is involved in improvements to the technology and growth in markets for the process. Mueller Co. offers all of its waterworks brass products in low-lead varieties., and the majority of the company's brass and iron castings contain recycled material from both post-consumer and industrial scrap.
