= 2019 Aurora, Illinois shooting =

Mass shooting in Illinois, U.S.

- Location: 41.7537°N 88.3316°W; Henry Pratt Company, 641 Archer Ave, Aurora, Illinois, United States
- Date: February 15, 2019; 7 years ago 1:24 – 2:59 p.m. (CST; UTC−6)
- Target: Employees at Henry Pratt Company
- Attack type: Mass shooting; workplace violence; mass murder; shootout
- Weapon: Smith & Wesson M&P .40-caliber semi-automatic pistol with a green laser sight
- Deaths: 6 (including the perpetrator)
- Injuries: 7 (6 by gunfire)
- Perpetrator: Gary Montez Martin

On February 15, 2019, a mass shooting took place at the Henry Pratt Company in Aurora, Illinois, United States. Six people died, including the perpetrator, 45-year-old former employee Gary Montez Martin, who was shot and killed by responding police officers. Six others were injured, including five police officers.

== Incident ==
The first reports of the shooting began to arrive at 1:24 p.m., with the first officers arriving four minutes from the first call. Witnesses said they saw the perpetrator carrying a handgun with a green laser sight attached. The shooting prompted a multi-agency response with agents from the Federal Bureau of Investigation, the Bureau of Alcohol, Tobacco, Firearms and Explosives, and the United States Marshals Service assisting local police. The shooter returned fire when law enforcement arrived. Officers reported at 2:59 p.m. that the suspect had been shot and killed. The exchange of gunfire lasted about 90 minutes. In total, five people were killed by the gunman. Five police officers were injured along with another civilian. The perpetrator was killed by law enforcement officers. They shot the assailant a total of six times, including a shot that struck him in the middle of the forehead.

== Victims ==
The five victims fatally shot were male workers at the Henry Pratt plant: 32-year-old human resources manager Clayton Parks, 37-year-old plant manager Josh Pinkard, 46-year-old mold operator Russell Beyer, 54-year-old stock room attendant and forklift operator Vicente Juarez, and Trevor Wehner, a 21-year-old student of Northern Illinois University on his first day as a human resources intern.

A sixth plant employee sustained gunshot wounds during the shooting and was hospitalized with non-life-threatening injuries.

The six injured police officers ranged in age from 23 to 59. Four of them sustained gunshot wounds, one was injured by shrapnel, and one had a non-gunshot injury sustained while responding to the shooting. None of the injuries were life-threatening.

== Perpetrator ==
Gary Montez Martin (born April 28, 1973), a 45-year-old former employee of the Henry Pratt plant was identified as the perpetrator. Relatives of the shooter told reporters that he had been released from his position at the company about two weeks prior to the shooting. Other news outlets reported that he was being fired from his job on the day of the shooting, and that the shooting itself started during the termination meeting.

Martin was born and raised in Holly Springs, Mississippi. He was convicted in 1995 for a felony aggravated assault while living in Mississippi, and served two-and-a-half years in prison for that conviction. Aurora police stated that he had six arrests with the Aurora Police Department, including arrests for domestic violence and violating a restraining order, and that he had a 2017 arrest in Oswego, Illinois for disorderly conduct and criminal damage to property.

Martin was not legally allowed to possess a gun in Illinois because of his prior felony conviction in Mississippi. However, in 2014 he applied for, and was issued an Illinois FOID card by the Illinois State Police. In March 2014, he was able to buy a gun (which he is believed to have used during the shooting) from a licensed gun dealer in Aurora using that FOID card. Later that month he applied for a concealed carry license from the Illinois State Police. The concealed carry background check included a fingerprint check, and Martin's felony conviction was discovered at that point. The Illinois State Police rejected his concealed carry application, cancelled his FOID card and sent him a written notice demanding that he turn in the gun that he had purchased. He did not do so. According to a CNN report, the authorities were trying "to determine why he didn't surrender the weapon and whether law enforcement followed up with him to confiscate the gun."

On February 15, after the shooting, the police conducted a search of Martin's home but did not find anything to indicate that he had planned the shooting in advance. Upon further investigation into the crime, the police found out that the gunman did plan this attack. On May 1, it was reported that the gunman entered the workplace with a gun and intended opening fire on people inside. The police learned from interviewing workers at the plant that the gunman made threats prior to being fired, and is quoted as saying, "If I get fired, I'm going to kill every motherfucker in here" and "I am going to blow police up." The employee who heard this said he did not bother reporting this to anybody, as the gunman made comments like that regularly.

== Reactions ==
Senators Tammy Duckworth and Dick Durbin thanked law enforcement for their response, as did Governor J. B. Pritzker and President Donald Trump. Trump also offered condolences to the victims and their families. Aurora Mayor Richard Irvin said, "It's a shame that mass shootings such as this have become commonplace in our country [and] that a cold and heartless offender would be so selfish as to think he has the right to take an innocent life. But we as a society cannot allow these horrific acts to become commonplace."

== See also ==
- List of homicides in Illinois
