= Müller (lunar crater) =

Crater on the Moon

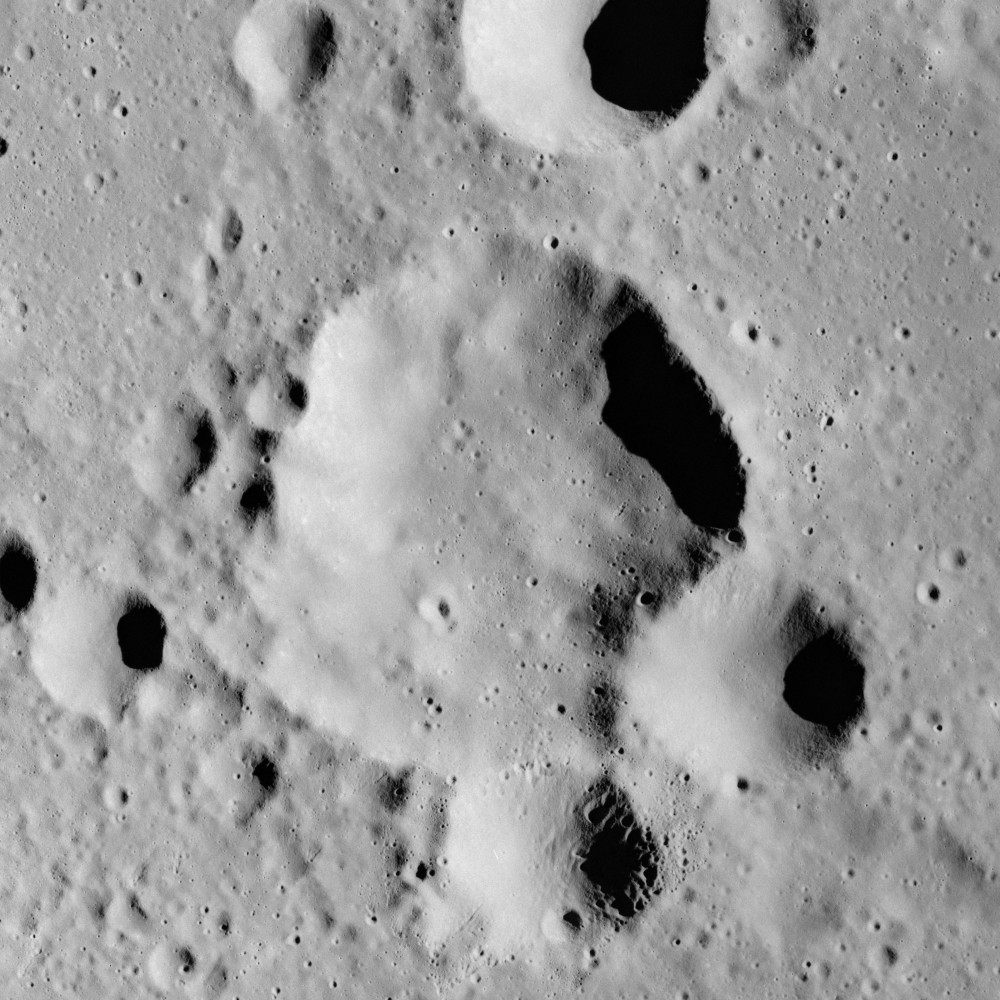
- Apollo 16 image
- Coordinates: 7.6°S 2.1°E
- Diameter: 24 × 20 km
- Depth: 2.10 km (1.30 mi)
- Colongitude: 358° at sunrise
- Eponym: Karl Müller

Müller is a lunar impact crater. It was named after Austrian astronomer Karl Müller. It is located in the highlands near the center of the Moon, in the center of the triangle formed by the much larger craters Albategnius, Ptolemaeus, and Hipparchus. To the east lies Halley, while to the northwest is Gyldén.

The rim of this crater is irregular and slightly oblong, with the long dimension oriented along a north–south axis. The southeastern rim is notched by two smaller craters identified as Müller A and Müller O.

Perhaps the most distinctive feature of this crater is the peculiar linear formation of small craters that starts at the southern edge of Müller's rim. These follow a line to the northwest, tangential to the rim of Ptolemaeus.

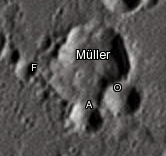
Müller crater and its satellite craters taken from Earth in 2012 at the University of Hertfordshire's Bayfordbury Observatory with the telescopes Meade LX200 14" and Lumenera Skynyx 2-1

== Satellite craters ==
By convention these features are identified on lunar maps by placing the letter on the side of the crater midpoint that is closest to Müller.

Müller	Latitude	Longitude	Diameter
A	8.2° S	2.1° E	10 km
F	7.8° S	1.5° E	6 km
O	7.9° S	2.4° E	11 km
