= Henry Pratt Company =

American manufacturing company

- Industry: Energy and water
- Founded: 1901
- Headquarters: Aurora, Illinois, United States
- Area served: North America
- Website: www.henrypratt.com

Henry Pratt Company is an American manufacturing company located in Aurora, Illinois.

== History ==
The company was incorporated on November 1, 1901 as the Henry Pratt Boiler and Machine Company. The founder Henry Pratt was named as president and treasurer. It was located at 875 S. Halsted Street in Chicago in a building that housed the office, machine shop and boiler shop. The company provided 16 inch valves for the first electric generating station of any significant size in the city of Chicago, which was built by the Commonwealth Edison Company in 1903.

Henry Pratt Company's main corporate office from mid-sixties was at 401 S, Highland Ave, Aurora IL 60506. Following are recent corporate events:

1. 1989 - Leveraged buyout by officers of the company with financing by Bank of Boston
2. 1991 - Henry Pratt Co. is acquired by Watts Industries
3. 1997 - Henry Pratt Co. is sold to Tyco International, starts operating as business unit of Mueller Company.
4. 1999 - Tyco International sold Mueller Co. to DLJ Merchant Banking Partners.
5. 2005 - Walter Industries purchases Mueller Water Products, parent company of Mueller Co.
6. 2006 - Mueller Water Products is spun off as a new business via IPO
7. 2006-2021 Henry Pratt Co. continues to operate as 'specialty valve' segment of Mueller Water Products with addition of newly acquired flow-control businesses: Hydro Gate 2001, Milliken Valve 2003, Pratt Industrial 2014, Lined Valve Company 2015, Singer Valve 2018.
8. 2020 - A phased consolidation of manufacturing plants of Henry Pratt into a modern newly built plant at Kimball, TN is announced.
9. 2022 - Henry Pratt Company office as well as manufacturing plant in Aurora, IL close on March 31, 2022; Pratt and other branded products now ship to customers from Tennessee.

== 2019 shooting ==
On February 15, 2019 during a termination meeting, employee Gary Martin began shooting with a handgun at staff. The shooting was reported at 1:24 p.m. (CT) (19:24 UTC), with first officers arriving four minutes later. Local police were assisted by the Federal Bureau of Investigation, the Bureau of Alcohol, Tobacco, Firearms and Explosives, and the United States Marshals Service. The shooter exchanged gunfire with law enforcement officers for about 90 minutes. Five people were killed, and five police officers and a civilian were injured. The perpetrator was killed by law enforcement officers.
