= 4031 Mueller =

Hungaria asteroid

Discovery
- Discovered by: C. Shoemaker
- Discovery site: Palomar Obs.
- Discovery date: 12 February 1985

Designations
- Named after: Jean Mueller (American astronomer)
- Alternative designations: 1985 CL · 1969 EN_{1}
- Minor planet category: main-belt · Hungaria

Orbital characteristics
- Epoch 4 September 2017 (JD 2458000.5)
- Uncertainty parameter 0
- Observation arc: 32.13 yr (11,734 days)
- Aphelion: 2.1291 AU
- Perihelion: 1.7394 AU
- Semi-major axis: 1.9342 AU
- Eccentricity: 0.1007
- Orbital period (sidereal): 2.69 yr (983 days)
- Mean anomaly: 100.23°
- Mean motion: 0° 21^{m} 59.04^{s} / day
- Inclination: 18.909°
- Longitude of ascending node: 355.88°
- Argument of perihelion: 69.444°

Physical characteristics
- Dimensions: 3.875±0.101 km 5.56 km (calculated)
- Synodic rotation period: 2.9420±0.0002 h 2.942±0.001 h (Note: Warner (2016) web-published rotation period of 2.942±0.001 hours with a brightness amplitude of 0.17 mag- LCDB quality code of 3. Summary figures for (4031) Mueller at Collaborative Asteroid Lightcurve Link (CALL)); 2.943±0.001 h 2.944±0.001 h (Note: Lightcurve plot of 4031 Mueller with a period of 2.944, Palmer Divide Observatory, B. D. Warner (2012))
- Geometric albedo: 0.30 (assumed); 0.3894±0.0782
- Spectral type: E · X
- Absolute magnitude (H): 13.2 · 13.34±0.29 · 13.7

4031 Mueller, provisional designation 1985 CL, is a Hungaria asteroid from the inner regions of the asteroid belt, approximately 4 kilometers in diameter. It was discovered on 12 February 1985, by American astronomer Carolyn Shoemaker at Palomar Observatory, California, and named after astronomer Jean Mueller.

== Orbit and classification ==
Mueller is a member of the Hungaria family, which form the innermost dense concentration of asteroids in the Solar System. It orbits the Sun in the inner main-belt at a distance of 1.7–2.1 AU once every 2 years and 8 months (983 days). Its orbit has an eccentricity of 0.10 and an inclination of 19° with respect to the ecliptic. The body was first identified as 1969 EN_{1} at Crimea–Nauchnij on 13 March 1969, yet the observation remained unused for the asteroid's observation arc.

== Physical characteristics ==
Mueller's spectral type is that of an E-type asteroid, typical for members of the Hungaria family. It has also been characterized as an X-type asteroid by PanSTARRS' photometric survey.

=== Rotation period ===
Four rotational lightcurves for this asteroid were obtained from photometric observations made by American astronomer Brian Warner at his Palmer Divide Observatory (716) between 2008 and 2016. They all gave a concurring, well-defined rotation period of 2.942 to 2.944 hours with a brightness variation between 0.14 and 0.19 magnitude (U=3/3-/3-/3).

=== Diameter and albedo ===
According to the survey carried out by NASA's Wide-field Infrared Survey Explorer with its subsequent NEOWISE mission, the asteroid measures 3.9 kilometers in diameter and its surface has a high albedo of 0.389, while the Collaborative Asteroid Lightcurve Link assumes an albedo of 0.30 and calculates a diameter of 5.56 kilometers with an absolute magnitude of 13.2.

== Naming ==
This minor planet was named after American astronomer Jean Mueller (b. 1950), discoverer of minor planets, comets and supernovae during the course of the Second Palomar Observatory Sky Survey (POSS II) using the Oschin Telescope at Palomar Observatory in the late 1980s and early 1990s. The official naming citation was published by the Minor Planet Center on 12 December 1989 (M.P.C. 15576).
