= Muller (restaurant) =

Coordinates: 53°13′5.46″N 6°33′43.84″E

- Interactive map of Muller

Restaurant information
- Established: 1991
- Owner: Jean-Michel Hengge
- Head chef: Jean-Michel Hengge
- Food type: French
- Rating: Michelin Guide
- Location: Grote Kromme Elleboog 13, Groningen, 9712 BJ, Netherlands
- Seating capacity: 10
- Website: Official website

Muller is a restaurant in Groningen, in the Netherlands. It is a fine dining restaurant that is awarded one Michelin star in 1997 and retained that rating until 2012. GaultMillau did not award any points, due to the recent change of course but kept the restaurant in the Guide.

Muller was founded in 1991 by Frank Verbeek and Jacques Muller. They hired Jean-Michel Hengge, formerly of Les Quatre Saisons, to do the cooking. In 1992 he bought the restaurant.

In 2011, owner and head chef Jean-Michel Hengge changed course in his restaurant. From a restaurant with kitchen staff, he turned it into a one-man show. Regaining the star in 2012 was a victory for Hengge. According to Hengge it felt like getting a complete new Michelin star.

Muller is a member of Les Patrons Cuisiniers.

== See also ==
- List of Michelin starred restaurants in the Netherlands
