= Mueller Tower =

Bell tower in Lincoln, Nebraska

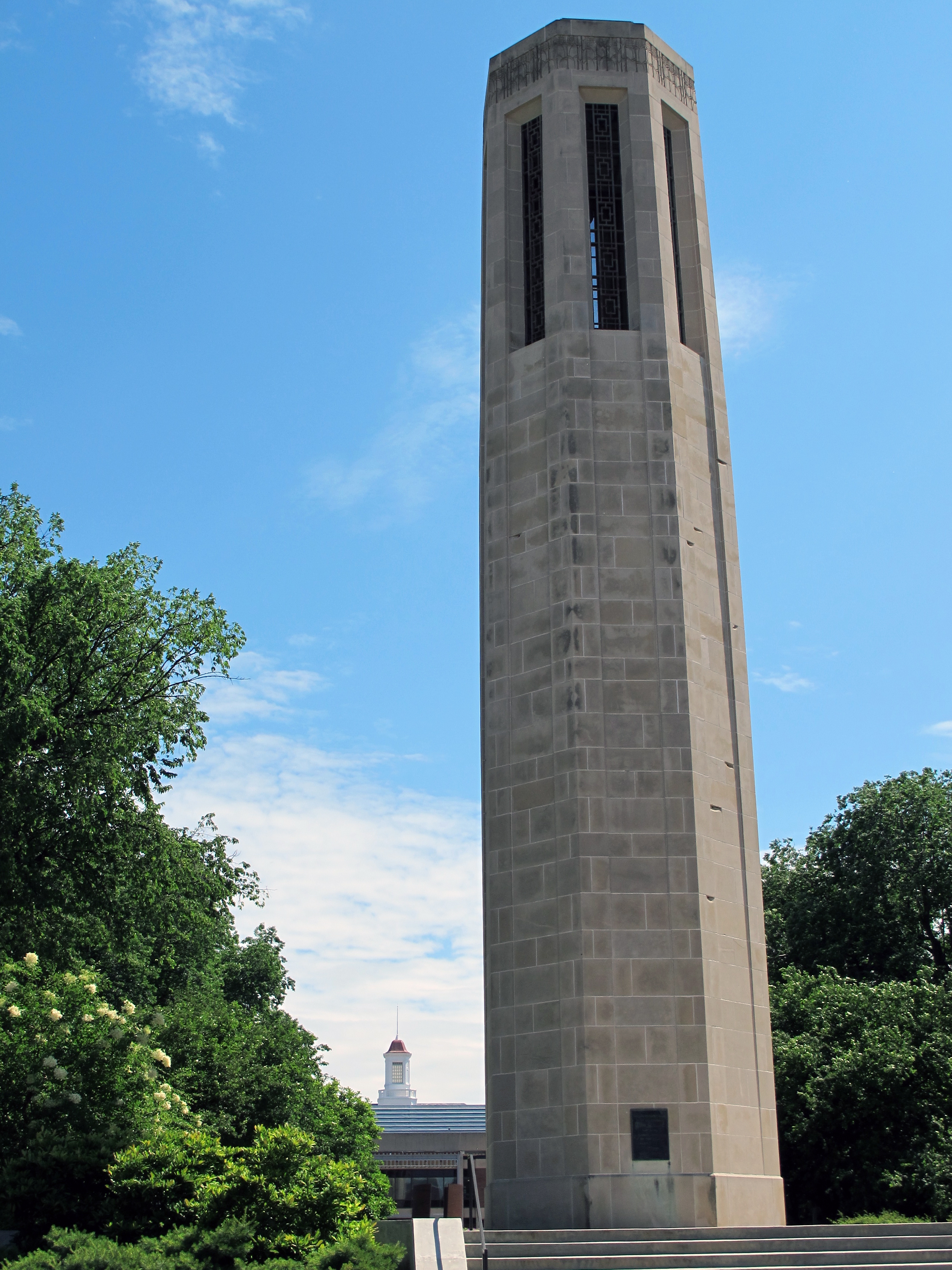

General information
- Location: Lincoln, Nebraska, United States
- Coordinates: 40°49′12.5″N 96°42′09.3″W
- Completed: 1949
- Cost: $90,000 ($1.22 million in 2025)
- Owner: University of Nebraska–Lincoln

Height
- Height: 84 feet

Design and construction
- Architect: George Kuska Jr.
- Architecture firm: Meginnis and Schaumberg

Mueller Tower is a bell tower on the campus of the University of Nebraska–Lincoln in Lincoln, Nebraska. It was built in 1949 and is named for alumnus and donor Ralph S. Mueller.

== History ==
In the mid-1940s, Ralph S. Mueller, an 1898 alumnus of the University of Nebraska and the founder of the Cleveland-based Mueller Electric Company, expressed his desire to give a gift to the school that incorporated electronics. Chancellor Reuben G. Gustavson suggested a new bell tower, which NU had lacked since University Hall was demolished in 1925. Mueller agreed and donated $90,000 (equivalent to $1,218,000 in 2025) to the project, which would incorporate finely tuned electric rods instead of a traditional array of bells. The system is controlled from the basement of nearby Andrews Hall.

The eighty-four-foot Mueller Tower is an octagonal shape with a red-brick interior surrounded by an Indiana Limestone exterior. It was dedicated on November 4, 1949 with 2,000 people in attendance, including Mueller, Gustavson, university president Harold S. Wilson, University of Kansas president Deane Waldo Malott, and carillonneur Arthur Lynds Bigelow.

=== Restorations ===
The bell tower was cordoned off in 2006 as the limestone began to collapse and the university lacked funding to restore it. By then, it had become "one of the most recognizable structures on campus," and officials vowed to restore it shortly.

In 2025, NU began a $1.5-million restoration of Mueller Tower designed to "preserve its structural integrity and historic character for the future." As part of the restoration, each of the tower's 1,700 stones were scanned and catalogued, identifying seventy-eight to be fully replaced.

== Use ==
The tower's music, initially played by keyboard, is now broadcast by eight speakers which play taped recordings or live music. As late as 1985, a student played the keyboard prior to football games at the top of the tower. For prerecorded music, an Embassy Digital Autobell Carillon machine is used.

The tower has been used to commemorate special occasions, including the sixteenth anniversary of the AIDS epidemic on December 4, 1996, three days after World AIDS Day. The system broadcasts music selected randomly from a predetermined list of approximately fifty songs at the top of the hour and at twenty-three minutes past the hour.
