= Müller =

Müller may refer to:

== Companies ==
- Müller (company), a German multinational dairy company
  - Müller Milk & Ingredients, a UK subsidiary of the German company
- Müller (store), a German retail chain
- GMD Müller, a Swiss aerial lift manufacturing company

== Places ==
- Müller Glacier, Antarctica
- Müller Mountains, Borneo
- Müller Point, on the east coast of South Georgia
- Müller (lunar crater)
- Müller (Martian crater)
- Müller House, a historic house in Arlington Heights, Illinois, U.S.

== People and characters ==
- Müller (surname), a German surname
- Müller (footballer, born 1957), José Edmur Lucas Corrêa, Brazilian footballer
- Müller (footballer, born 1966), Luís Antônio Corrêa da Costa, Brazilian footballer
- Müller Brothers, two 19th-century string quartets
- Doctor Müller, a fictional character in The Adventures of Tintin by Hergé

== See also ==
- Mueller (disambiguation)
- Muller, a surname
