= Mueller Water Products =

American water product manufacturer

Mueller Water Products, Inc.
- Company type: Public
- Traded as: NYSE: MWA; S&P 600 component
- Industry: Water infrastructure
- Founded: 1857; 169 years ago
- Headquarters: Atlanta, Georgia, U.S.
- Area served: North America
- Key people: Scott Hall (President and CEO); Marietta Edmunds-Zakas (Chief Financial Officer)
- Revenue: US$1.138 billion (2014)
- Operating income: US$120.6 million (2016)
- Net income: US$63.9 million (2016)
- Total assets: US$1.280 billion (2016)
- Total equity: US$419.5 million (2016)
- Number of employees: 4,200
- Divisions: Mueller Co.; Mueller Technologies
- Website: www.muellerwaterproducts.com

Mueller Water Products, Inc. (MWP) is a publicly traded company headquartered in Atlanta, Georgia. It is one of the largest manufacturers and distributors of fire hydrants, gate valves, and other water infrastructure products in North America. MWP is made up of two business units—Mueller Co. and Mueller Technologies—that oversee more than a dozen brands and affiliates, including Echologics and Mueller Systems.

== History ==
Mueller Water Products was incorporated as a standalone business on September 22, 2005, but the company traces the history of its business units, subsidiaries and brands back as far as 1857, when the forerunner to Mueller Co. was founded by Hieronymus Mueller in Decatur, Illinois. Providence Steam and Gas Pipe became General Fire Extinguisher Co. in 1892 after merging with several sprinkler manufacturers, and was later renamed Grinnell Co. in 1919, after the company's president, Frederick Grinnell. In 1899, 12 companies incorporated as United States Cast Iron Pipe and Foundry Company, which would later be known as U.S. Pipe after dropping "cast iron" from the company name in 1929. Grinnell Co. became known as Anvil International in 2000.

Jim Walter Corporation acquired U.S. Pipe in 1969, and in 2005, it acquired Mueller Co. and Anvil International. The three businesses were combined to form Mueller Water Products. The combined entity was then spun off as the publicly held Mueller Water Products, Inc. in 2006, moving its headquarters from the company's birthplace of Decatur, Illinois, to Atlanta, Georgia. Initially, MWP operated with three business units—Mueller Co., Anvil International, and U.S. Pipe. However, in 2012 Mueller Water Products divested U.S. Pipe to Wynnchurch Capital, Ltd., retaining only the valve and hydrant division, which now operates under the Mueller Co. business unit. Early in 2017 Mueller Water Products sold its Anvil International division to One Equity Partners and also completed the acquisition of Singer Valve, a manufacturer of automatic control valves.

== Organization ==
=== Structure ===
Mueller Water Products is a publicly traded company governed by a board of 10 directors, including former Atlanta Mayor Shirley Franklin. It is divided into two Reporting Segments— Infrastructure Products and Technologies Products. Each of these units oversees several related brands and subsidiaries.

=== Mueller Co. ===
Mueller Co. is one of the largest North American manufacturers of valves and fire hydrants. It oversees several brands and subsidiaries that specialize in valves, fittings, utility meters, water infrastructure, leak detection, and pipe condition assessment.

Name	Description
Echologics	Echologics specializes in non-invasive acoustic detection of underground leaks and pipe condition assessment. It has conducted and completed projects in North America, Europe, Australia, South Africa, and Singapore that have mitigated the loss of millions of gallons of drinking water via leaking infrastructure. In 2012, Mueller Service Co., which also provides assessment and remediation services for water utilities, was consolidated under the Echologics brand.
Henry Pratt Company	The Henry Pratt Company develops, manufactures and sells valves, valve actuators and control systems for use in potable water, wastewater, power, industrial, and nuclear applications. The company was founded in 1901 as a metal fabricating shop, and it designed and developed the first rubber-seated butterfly valve in 1926. The company is headquartered in Aurora, Illinois, with manufacturing facilities in Aurora, Illinois, and Hammond, Indiana.
Hydro Gate	Hydro Gate provides water control gates for multiple industries and applications including flood control, water treatment, irrigation, dam projects, and hydroelectricity. Its products include cast iron and fabricated slide or flap gates, rectangular butterfly gates, stop logs, wall thimbles, lifts, and accessories.
James Jones Company	James Jones Company manufactures bronze wet barrel fire hydrants, and a variety of bronze water service valves and fittings for potable water distribution systems. The company was founded in the early 1890s by James Jones, and expanded from primarily manufacturing bronze valves to also manufacturing bronze fire hydrants in 1926. The company’s administrative headquarters are located in Ontario, California, and it has manufacturing facilities located in Illinois, Tennessee, and Alabama.
Milliken Valve Co.	Milliken Valve Co. develops, manufacturers, and sells plug, check, and butterfly valves, as well as related water, wastewater, and industrial controls and actuators.
Mueller Systems	Mueller Systems is a manufacturer and distributor of advanced metering infrastructure (AMI) and automatic meter reading (AMR) technology, as well as residential, commercial and fire-line meters and related products. Founded as Hawes and Hersey Company in 1859, Mueller Systems is the oldest manufacturer of water meters in the United States.
U.S. Pipe Valve & Hydrant Division	Pipe Valve and Hydrant Division (USPVH) produces fire hydrants and gate valves, as well as a variety of other potable water flow control products for water distribution systems and fire protection. USPVH products are manufactured in the company’s plants, which are ISO9001-certified and located in the United States.

== Sustainability ==
MWP is the only manufacturer of valves and hydrants that utilizes the lost-foam casting process, which reduces the amount of required materials for casting and reduces the amount of waste and emissions generated by the casting process. Mueller Co. offers all of its waterworks brass products in low-lead varieties. MWP utilizes Key Performance Indicators (KPIs) and establish KPI targets in order to track and drive sustainability results. They track performance KPIs in Energy, Water Conservation, Gas, and Solid Waste. MWP is also a member of the U.S. Green Building Council. and the EPA's Energy Star program.
