= 136P/Mueller =

Periodic comet

Discovery
- Discovered by: Jean Mueller
- Discovery site: Palomar Observatory
- Discovery date: 24 September 1990

Designations
- MPC designation: P/1990 S1; P/1998 K4
- Alternative designations: 1990 XIII, 1990l; Mueller 3

Orbital characteristics
- Epoch: 5 May 2025 (JD 2460800.5)
- Observation arc: 34.27 years
- Earliest precovery date: 17 September 1990
- Number of observations: 712
- Aphelion: 5.415 AU
- Perihelion: 2.963 AU
- Semi-major axis: 4.189 AU
- Eccentricity: 0.29313
- Orbital period: 8.562 years
- Inclination: 9.427°
- Longitude of ascending node: 137.42°
- Argument of periapsis: 225.31°
- Mean anomaly: 13.998°
- Last perihelion: 3 January 2025
- Next perihelion: 22 October 2033
- T_{Jupiter}: 2.934
- Earth MOID: 1.986 AU
- Jupiter MOID: 0.264 AU

Physical characteristics
- Mean radius: 1.15 km (0.71 mi)
- Geometric albedo: 0.04 (assumed)
- Comet total magnitude (M1): 7.4
- Comet nuclear magnitude (M2): 14.3

136P/Mueller, also known as Mueller 3, is a periodic comet in the Solar System.

== Observational history ==
Jean Mueller discovered the comet on exposed photographic plates taken by the Palomar Observatory on the night of 24 September 1990. At the time, it was a diffuse 18th-magnitude object in the constellation Cetus. (Note: Reported initial position upon discovery was: α = 1^{h} 38.8^{m} , δ = –2° 13′) Within a couple of days after discovery, Harold Holt found precovery images taken as early as 17 September. Orbital calculations by Edward L. G. Bowell and Daniel W. E. Green later indicated that Mueller's new find is a periodic comet.

James V. Scotti later successfully recovered the comet on 24 May 1998.

== Physical characteristics ==
Assuming a geometric albedo of 0.04, the comet's nucleus is estimated to have an effective radius of 1.2 ± 0.2 km (0.75 ± 0.12 mi).

=== References ===
Numbered comets
Previous; 135P/Shoemaker–Levy	136P/Mueller	Next; 137P/Shoemaker–Levy
