= Mount Mueller (Antarctica) =

Mountain in Enderby Land, Antarctica

Mount Mueller (66°55′S 55°32′E) is an ice-covered mountain standing close east of Mount Storegutt, 22 nautical miles (41 km) west of Edward VIll Bay in Enderby Land, Antarctica.

The mountain was mapped from aerial photos taken by the Australian National Antarctic Research Expeditions (ANARE) in 1956 and named in honor of F. von Mueller, a member of the Australian Antarctic Exploration Committee of 1886.
