= 120P/Mueller =

Periodic comet

Discovery
- Discovered by: Jean E. Mueller
- Discovery site: Palomar Observatory
- Discovery date: 18 October 1987

Designations
- MPC designation: P/1987 U2; P/1995 O2
- Alternative designations: Mueller 1; 1987 XXXI, 1987a1

Orbital characteristics
- Epoch: 6 September 2007 (JD 2454349.5)
- Observation arc: 34.14 years
- Number of observations: 147
- Aphelion: 5.527 AU
- Perihelion: 2.744 AU
- Semi-major axis: 4.136 AU
- Eccentricity: 0.33654
- Orbital period: 8.412 years
- Inclination: 8.791°
- Longitude of ascending node: 4.443°
- Argument of periapsis: 30.008°
- Mean anomaly: 125.57°
- Last perihelion: 7 May 2021
- Next perihelion: 5 April 2029
- T_{Jupiter}: 2.917
- Earth MOID: 1.754 AU
- Jupiter MOID: 0.265 AU

Physical characteristics
- Mean radius: 0.77 km (0.48 mi)
- Mean density: 610±90 kg/m^{3}
- Comet total magnitude (M1): 6.6
- Comet nuclear magnitude (M2): 16.4

120P/Mueller, also known as Mueller 1, is a Jupiter-family comet with an 8.4-year orbit around the Sun. It is one of 15 comets discovered by American astronomer, Jean Mueller.

== Observational history ==
Jean Mueller first spotted the comet on photographic plates exposed from the Palomar Observatory on the night of 18 October 1987. She described the new comet as a diffuse 17th-magnitude object within the constellation Pisces. (Note: Reported initial position upon discovery was: α = 1^{h} 12^{m} 47.4^{s}, δ = 12° 25′ 50″) A condensation and an apparent tail about 20–30 arcseconds in length towards the south-southwest was also noted. Orbital calculations using follow-up observations until 27 October 1987 helped Daniel W. E. Green to determine Mueller's comet as periodic, at the time having an orbital period of roughly 8.21 years.

James V. Scotti recovered the comet from the Kitt Peak Observatory on 30 July 1995 as P/1995 O1. It was a 22nd-magnitude object at the time of its recovery. The comet was observed from every subsequent apparition since. It most recently came to perihelion in May 2021 and underwent a 1.4 magnitude outburst in August 2021.

== Physical characteristics ==
Initial estimates of the size of its nucleus in 2004 was approximately 3.0 km (1.9 mi) in diameter. Optical photometry obtained in 2007 revised this to half of the previous estimate, currently about 1.54 km (0.96 mi) in diameter.

== Notes ==
Numbered comets
Previous; 119P/Parker–Hartley	120P/Mueller	Next; 121P/Shoemaker–Holt
