= Mueller Systems =

- Industry: Utility metering
- Predecessor: Arkion Systems; Hawes and Hersey Co.; Hersey Meter Co.; Hersey-Sparling Meter Co.
- Founded: 1859; 167 years ago
- Headquarters: Cleveland, North Carolina, United States
- Key people: Joel Hagan (general manager of Mueller Systems); Marietta Zakas (president and CEO of Mueller Water Products)
- Products: Remote Disconnect Meters; Ultrasonic Meters; AMI Networks; AMI Endpoints; Sentryx User Interface
- Parent: Mueller Water Products, Inc.
- Website: www.muellersystems.com

Mueller Systems is a manufacturer and distributor of advanced metering infrastructure (AMI) and automatic meter reading (AMR) technology, as well as residential, commercial and fire-line meters and related products. It is a subsidiary of Mueller Water Products. Founded as Hawes and Hersey Company in 1859, Mueller Systems is the oldest manufacturer of water meters in the United States.

== History ==
Mueller Systems was founded in 1859 as Hawes and Hersey Company in Boston, Massachusetts and was a manufacturer of bolts, rotary pumps, and other machinery. In 1885, the company received a patent on the rotary displacement meter and began manufacturing water meters under the name Hersey Meter Company, offering its first rotary and disc meters for sale in 1886.

In 1959, Hersey Meters merged with Sparling Meter Company and began operating as Hersey-Sparling Meter Company. The company operated under this name until 1988, when it was placed under the Mueller Water Products subsidiary, Mueller Co. and re-assumed the name Hersey Meters. Following the Mueller Water Products' acquisition of Arkion Systems in 2009, Hersey was combined with Arkion and began operating as Mueller Systems in 2010, to reflect the broader range of utility management products offered by the combined entity. However, Hersey Meters remains Mueller Systems' brand for water meters.

== Installation Case Studies / News ==
=== Asheville, NC ===
The Water Department for the City of Asheville, North Carolina, uses smart meters from Mueller Systems.

=== Chillicothe, Missouri ===
Chillicothe Municipal Utilities (CMU) in Chillicothe, Missouri implemented the Mi.Net AMI system as part of its initiative to replace over 4,000 water and electricity meters in its system, with the goals of improving customer service, automating meter reading and billing, and preparing to meet future service demands. The Mi.Net AMI system has improved conservation of both water and electricity by providing both CMU and customers with a nearly real-time monitoring capability of usage, which improves consumer awareness of consumption and more immediate notice of potential water leaks and electricity outages to the utility provider. CMU's system upgrade also increased its revenues by reducing the lag time between the beginning of meter reading and the issuance of bills from 15 days to three.

=== Davie County, North Carolina ===
Davie County installed the Hot Rod AMR system to reduce the time and expense of discovering water leaks. The automated system saved the county in meter-reading time and resulted in increased revenues. About half of Davie County's customers have converted to the Hot Rod system, and it will be completely deployed throughout the county by 2015.

=== Frankfort, New York ===
A 2009 Community Development Block Grant funded a meter replacement program in the village of Frankfort, New York. The $500,000 grant covered the replacement of all water and electric meters in the service area, and the upgrade instituted Mueller Systems' AMI system. According to Frankfort Mayor Frank Moracco, the AMI system reduced the number of man-hours required to collect meter reads without eliminating any jobs. The project was awarded first place in the public works category of the New York State Conference of Mayors and Municipal Officials' 24th annual Local Government Achievement Award Program.

=== Hudson Oaks, Texas ===
The city council approved a pilot program in February 2013, which includes the installation and implementation of Mueller's advanced meter-reading systems for the Red Eagle neighborhood. The pilot program will test 50 meters from the start.

=== Kannapolis, NC ===
The City of Kannapolis, North Carolina upgraded its water system with Mueller Systems' advanced metering infrastructure (AMI) network. Mueller Systems is a provider of innovative water infrastructure products and services and technologically advanced metering systems for water and electric systems. In addition to the Mi.Net System, the City installed approximately 18,000 Mueller Systems water meters throughout the City in 2014. A portion of the residential meters are Mueller Systems' 420 Remote Disconnect Meter (RDM), a fully integrated remote disconnect meter designed to enable the city to remotely manage water services through the Mi.Net System. The city also offers its constituents tools to manage their water consumption by implementing Mi.Data™, Mueller Systems' consumer portal that provides information about water usage and improved communication between households and the city.

=== Maumee, Ohio ===
To replace its old metering system with smart meters, the city of Maumee installed the Mi.Net two-way advanced metering infrastructure network for operational efficiencies. The network links the meters, distribution sites and control devices into one data center that will help the water department automate meter readings, identify abnormally high water usage that may indicate water leaks and provide insight for customers regarding their water bills or usage. The city's water customers can monitor their household's water usage and bills using an online portal and set goals to conserve water or save money on future bills, receiving alerts if consumption exceeds their goals. The city is replacing all current compound water meters with HbMag, which will integrate it with the Mi.Net system to monitor the amount of water going in and out of the city. The water department is expected to deploy 6,500 meters in 2013.

=== South Mesa, California ===
South Mesa Water Co. (SMWC) provides water service to about 3,000 customers in Calimesa and Yucaipa, California. The desert-based utility has struggled for years to minimize and reduce consumption, implementing higher rates on customers who used more than 3,500 cubic feet of water every two months. However, this system increased the amount of time spent reading meters and processing bills—it took two meter readers six days every month to read every meter in the system. When the state of California mandated that all water systems reduce usage by 20 percent in 2009, SMWC implemented an initiative to replace its existing metering system with Mueller Systems' Hot Rod AMR System. The amount of time spent collecting meter reads was reduced from six days to four hours, and consumption within SMWC's service area dropped by 22 percent, largely due to the AMR system's real-time monitoring that can detect leaks earlier and provide more detailed usage data to both SMWC and its customers.

=== Weatherford, Oklahoma ===
The city of Weatherford, Oklahoma replaced all 5,500 water meters in its service area and implemented the Mi.Net AMI system in order to upgrade and automate its meter-reading and billing processes. The two-way AMI system is hosted and supported by Mueller and helps the city monitor, manage and streamline the meter-reading process. Weatherford also used Mi.Hydrants to overcome transmission problems caused by steel meter boxes and large distances between some meters. The improved leak detection, consumer information, and billing accuracy afforded by the upgrade of the city's metering system resulted in better conservation and fewer consumer complaints about usage and billing. Water & Wastes Digest named the "Weatherford Customer Service & Efficiency Improvement Project" as one of its top projects for 2012.

=== West Virginia American Water ===
In October 2014, West Virginia American Water announced that they would install the Mi.Echo remote leak detection system along a 10-mile stretch of the Kanawha Valley River. Upon its completion, this will be the largest deployment of the Mi.Echo system to date, and will include the cities of Charleston and South Charleston, Kanawha City, and Dunbar, West Virginia.

=== Yonkers, NY ===
Mayor Mike Spano announced the City of Yonkers is partnering with Mueller Systems to overhaul its aging water meter infrastructure and improve the level of service provided to residents. The project includes implementation of Mueller System's MegaNet System—a high-powered, long-range, fixed-network, advanced metering infrastructure ( AMI) system. The communication system is capable of delivering long-range results with a reliable communication infrastructure. The MegaNet technology has been in existence for 25 years and has nearly two million transmitters installed in more than 80 countries. In addition, the city is scheduled to install approximately 30,000 Mueller Systems water meters throughout the city by the end of 2014. The city will also offer its customers tools to manage their water consumption by implementing Mi.Data, Mueller Systems' consumer portal. This consumer portal provides utility customers with access to information about their water usage, enhancing service levels and communication between the city and its water consumers.
