= 173P/Mueller =

Periodic comet with 13 year orbit

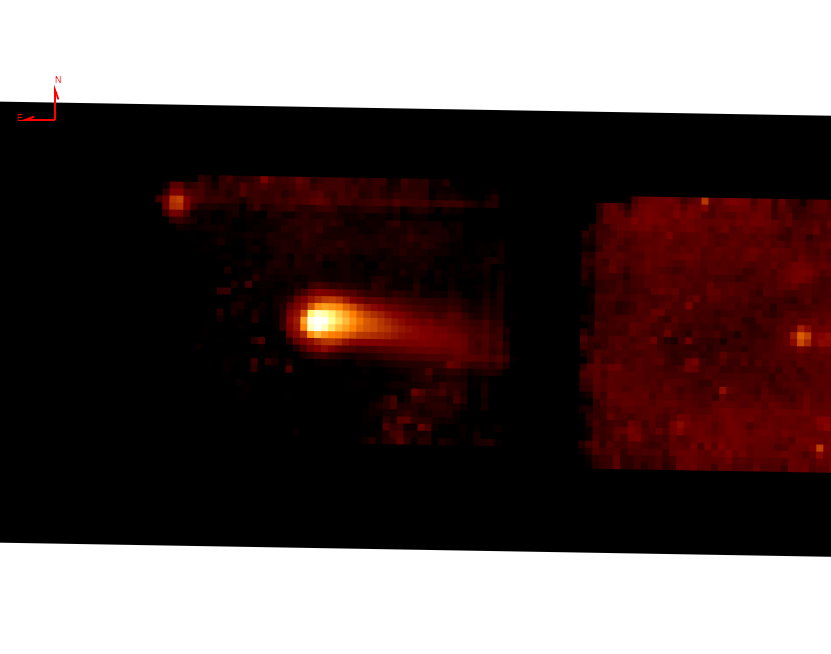

Discovery
- Discovered by: Jean Mueller
- Discovery date: November 20, 1993

Designations
- Alternative designations: 1993 W1; 1994 XXV; 2005 T1

Orbital characteristics
- Epoch: March 6, 2006
- Aphelion: 7.202 AU
- Perihelion: 4.213 AU
- Semi-major axis: 5.707 AU
- Eccentricity: 0.2618
- Orbital period: 13.64 a
- Inclination: 16.4919°
- Last perihelion: December 16, 2021; May 18, 2008
- Next perihelion: 2035-Aug-29

173P/Mueller, also known as Mueller 5, is a periodic comet in the Solar System with an orbital period of 13.6 years.

The comet was discovered by Jean Mueller in plates exposed on 20 November 1993 as part of the second Palomar Sky Survey. The comet had an apparent magnitude of 17.5–18 and a tail about 80 arcseconds long. The comet was recovered by Eric J. Christensen in images obtained on 6 October 2005 during the Mount Lemmon Survey. The comet then han an apparent magnitude of 18–18.4.

The nucleus of the comet is estimated to have a radius of 4.28+0.95
−1.17 km based on infrared imaging by the Spitzer Space Telescope.

Numbered comets
Previous; 172P/Yeung	173P/Mueller	Next; 174P/Echeclus
