= Jean Mueller =

American astronomer

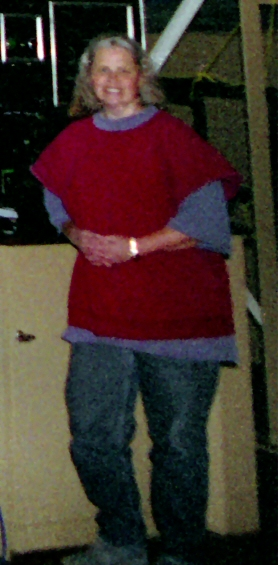

Jean Mueller (born 1950) is an American astronomer and discoverer of comets, minor planets, and a large number of supernovas at the U.S. Palomar Observatory in California.

== Scientific career ==
In 1983, she became the first woman to operate the historic Hooker telescope at Mt. Wilson Observatory and was the first woman hired as a telescope operator at Palomar Observatory in 1985.

The Second Palomar Observatory Sky Survey (POSS II) got under way in August 1985, with the first of the 14" photographic glass plates being pulled off the Palomar's Samuel Oschin telescope (then called the 48-inch Schmidt Camera). Jean Mueller was hired as the 48-Inch Night Assistant in July of that year, and worked in the capacity as observer and telescope operator for the duration. She took over 5500 photographic plates and had the honor of setting the telescope and removing the final plate from the historic Schmidt Camera on June 3, 2000, as well as discovering her last supernova, 2000cm, on that same night.

Jean Mueller spent hundreds of hours (in her spare time) scanning POSS II plates under high magnification looking for comets, fast-moving asteroids, and supernovae on an X/Y stage that held the 1 mm thick glass plates. Mueller would sometimes mark over a hundred galaxies recorded on a single POSS II plate to hunt for supernova candidates. She would then compare these plates with the first Palomar Sky Survey (POSS I) of similar fields. It was during the years of the POSS II project that Jean Mueller made all of her discoveries.

== Discoveries ==
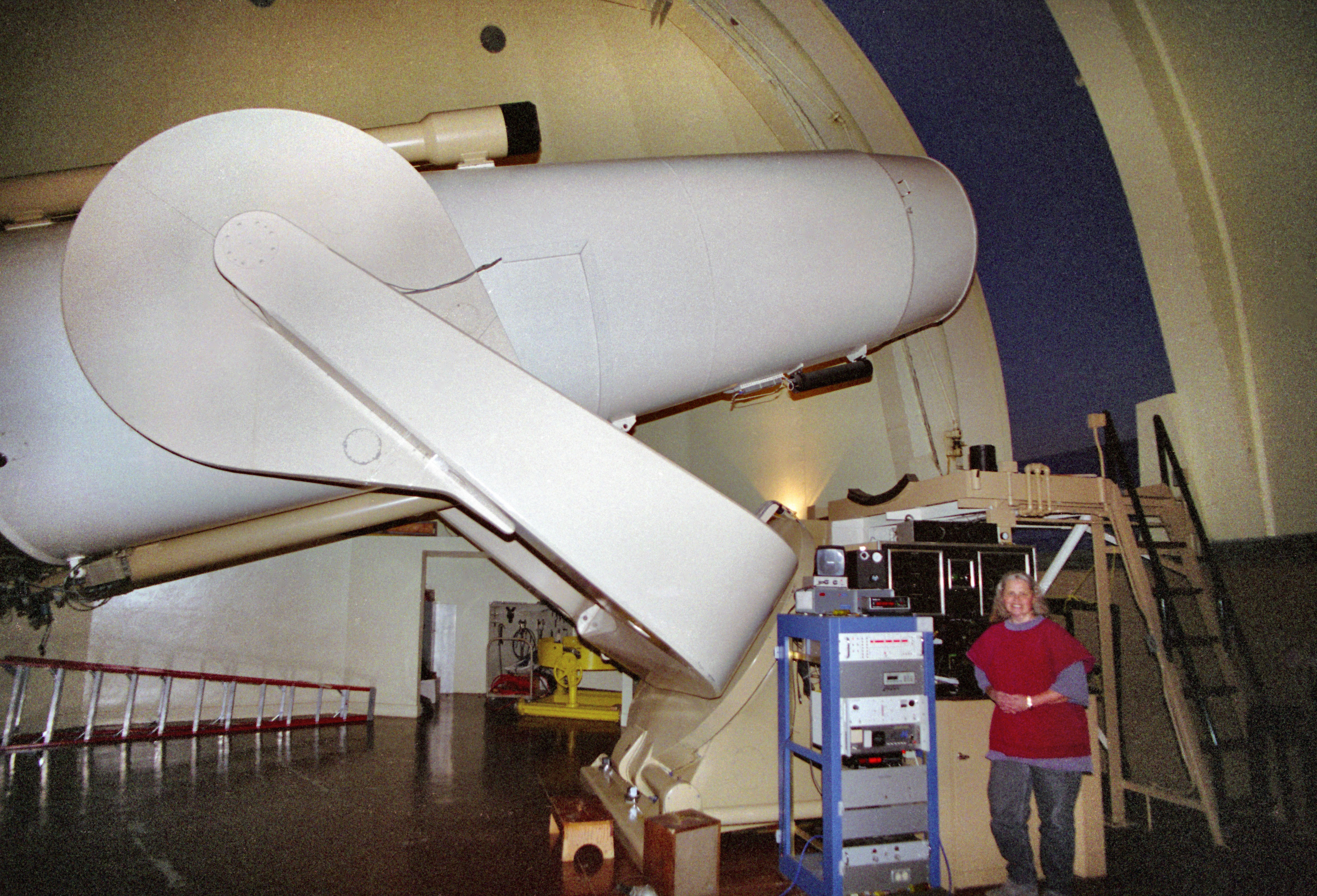
Jean Mueller with the Samuel Oschin telescope

Minor planets discovered: 13
4257 Ubasti	August 23, 1987
4558 Janesick^{[1]}	July 12, 1988
6569 Ondaatje	June 22, 1993
9162 Kwiila	July 29, 1987
(11028) 1987 UW	October 18, 1987
11500 Tomaiyowit^{[2]}	October 28, 1989
12711 Tukmit	January 19, 1991
16465 Basilrowe	March 24, 1990
19204 Joshuatree	June 21, 1992
24658 Misch	October 18, 1987
(360191) 1988 TA^{[3]}	October 5, 1988
(408752) 1991 TB_{2}	3 October 1991
(412976) 1987 WC	21 November 1987
1. ^{1} with A. Maury; 2. ^{2} with J. D. Mendenhall; 3. ^{3} with J. Phinney

Working at Palomar Observatory, she discovered a total of 15 comets, including 7 periodic comets 120P/Mueller, 131P/Mueller, 136P/Mueller, 149P/Mueller, 173P/Mueller, 188P/LINEAR-Mueller, 190P/Mueller, and 8 non-periodic comets.

She is credited by the Minor Planet Center with the discovery of 13 numbered minor planets during 1987–1993, including several near-Earth objects such as the Apollo asteroids 4257 Ubasti, 9162 Kwiila, and 12711 Tukmit and the Amor asteroid 6569 Ondaatje. Mueller consulted with the Pauma Band of Luiseno Mission Indians for the naming of 9162 Kwiila, 11500 Tomaiyowit, and 12711 Tukmit whose names honored Luiseño gods.

Mueller also discovered 107 (9 listed as co-discoveries) supernovae.

== Honors ==
The inner main-belt asteroid of the Hungaria family, 4031 Mueller, was named in honor of Jean Mueller for her astronomical discoveries. Discovered on February 12, 1985, by Carolyn Shoemaker at Palomar Observatory with the 18" Schmidt Camera, it was originally designated 1985 CL. The official naming citation was published by the Minor Planet Center on 12 December 1989 (M.P.C. 15576).

== Affiliations ==
Jean Mueller is an Advisor of the Meade 4M Community who supports her outreach activities.
