= Youth of the European People's Party =

Youth wing of the European People's Party

Youth of European People's Party
- Abbreviation: YEPP
- President: Sophia Kircher
- Secretary-General: Edelmira Ferri
- Founded: 1997
- Headquarters: Rue du Commerce 10, B-1000, Brussels, Belgium
- Ideology: Christian democracy Conservatism; Liberal conservatism Pro-Europeanism
- Political position: Centre-right
- European Parliament group: European People's Party
- Colours: Light blue Dark blue

Website
- www.youthepp.eu

Youth of the European People's Party (YEPP) is the youth wing of the European People's Party. YEPP brings together 64 centre-right youth political organisations from 40 countries all over Europe. Founded in 1997 by the 2006–2014 Prime Minister of Sweden Fredrik Reinfeldt, YEPP has developed into the largest political youth organisation in Europe.

Full members status is held to the European Youth Forum (YFJ) which operates within the Council of Europe and European Union areas and works closely with both these bodies (full members status to the European Youth Forum has also Democrat Youth Community of Europe, whose senior branch merged into the European People's Party in 2002). YEPP is also a full member of the Union of the Robert Schuman Institute for Developing Democracy in Central and Eastern Europe. Every board is elected for two years.

== List of presidents ==
- Fredrik Reinfeldt (Sweden), 1997–1999
- Michael Hahn (Germany), 1999–2001
- Rutger-Jan Hebben (Netherlands), 2001–2003
- Daniel Bautista (Spain), 2003–2005
- David Hansen (Norway), 2005–2007
- Ioannis Smyrlis (Greece), 2007–2009
- Laurent Schouteten (France), 2009–2011
- Csaba Dömötör (Hungary), 2011–2013
- Konstantinos Kyranakis (Greece), 2013–2017
- Andrianos Giannou (Romania), 2017–2018
- Lídia Pereira (Portugal), 2018–2025
- Sophia Kircher (Austria), 2025–Present

== Board members (2025-2027) ==
- YEPP President Sophia Kircher (Junge ÖVP, Austria)
- YEPP First Vice-President Tea Jerković (MHDZ, Croatia)
- YEPP Secretary-General Edelmira Ferri Hernandez (NNGG, Spain)
- YEPP Deputy Secretary-General Eoin Scarlett (YFG, Ireland)
- YEPP Treasurer Carl Gustav Pffeifer (MUF, Sweden)
- YEPP Vice-Presidents: Severin Hirmer (JU, Germany), Vassilis Sakellaris (ONNED, Greece), Todor Koneski (Youth Forces Union of VMRO-DPMNE, North Macedonia), Maria Miala (KNL, Finland), Žiga Ciglarič (SDM, Slovenia), João Cerejo dos Santos (JSD, Portugal), Ludovco Seppilli (FIG, Italy), Max Špachta (Top tým, Czech Republic) and Metty Steinmetz (CSJ, Luxembourg).

Financial Auditors

- Sara Marinelli (GDC, San Marino)
- Michele Roncoroni (JM, Switzerland)

== Board members (2023-2025) ==
- YEPP President Lídia Pereira (JSD, Portugal)
- YEPP First Vice-President Sophia Kircher (Junge ÖVP, Austria)
- YEPP Secretary-General Heidi Hanhela (KNL, Finland)
- YEPP Deputy Secretary-General Vassilis Sakellaris (ONNED, Greece)
- YEPP Treasurer Adam Bátovský (KDMS, Slovakia)
- YEPP Vice-Presidents: Eoin Scarlett (YFG, Ireland), Dora Szilagyi (MIERT, Romania), Ola Svenneby (UHL, Norway), Severin Hirmer (JU, Germany), Edelmira Ferri Hernandez (NNGG, Spain), Tea Jerković (MHDZ, Croatia), Derek Groot (CDJA, Netherlands), Oleksander Afanasiev (BM, Ukraine) and Florian Gasser (JG SVP, Italy).

Financial Auditors

- Metty Steinmetz (CSJ, Luxembourg)
- Michele Roncoroni (JM, Switzerland)

== Board members (2021-2023) ==
- YEPP President Lídia Pereira (JSD, Portugal)
- YEPP First Vice-president Christian Zoll (Junge ÖVP, Austria)
- YEPP Secretary General Kevin Maas (Jong CD&V, Belgium)
- YEPP Deputy Secretary General Silva Mertsola (KNL, Finland)
- YEPP Treasurer Vassilis Sakellaris (ONNED, Greece)
- YEPP Vice-presidents Martin Hallander (KDU, Sweden), Regina Frieser (JU, Germany), Edelmira Ferri Hernandez (NNGG, Spain), Vít Mikušek (ML, Czech Republic), Zarja Bregant (SDM, Slovenia), Mara Mareș (TNL, Romania), Marco Parroccini (FIG, Italy), Nikola Eric (UM SNS, Serbia) and Paula Campbell (YFG, Ireland).

Financial Auditors

- Carol De Biagi (GDC, San Marino)
- Gianluca Sciberras (MZPN, Malta)

== Board members (2018–2021) ==
- YEPP President Lídia Pereira (JSD, Portugal)
- YEPP Secretary General Eileen Lynch (YFG, Ireland)
- YEPP First Vice-president Stephan Beer (JU, Germany)
- YEPP Deputy Secretary General Christina Balaska (ONNED, Greece)
- YEPP Treasurer Ali-Reza Abdali (KNL, Finland)
- YEPP Vice-presidents: Ágnes Zsofia Magyar (Fidelitas, Hungary), Mara Mares (TNL, Romania), Nikola Eric (UM SNS, Serbia), Martin Hallander (KDU, Sweden), Christian Zoll (Junge ÖVP, Austria), Zsombor Ambrus (MIERT, Romania), Karlo Ressler (MHDZ, Croatia), Marcello Gamberale (FIG, Italy), Tino Schneider (JCVP, Switzerland)

== Board members (2017–2018) ==
- YEPP President Andrianos Giannou (TNL, Romania)
- YEPP Secretary General Maru Pardal (NNGG, Spain)
- YEPP First Vice-president Jim Lefebre (Junge ÖVP, Austria)
- YEPP Deputy Secretary General Lotte Schipper (CDJA, The Netherlands)
- YEPP Treasurer Pierre-Henri Dumont (JR, France)
- YEPP Vice-presidents: Ágnes Zsofia Magyar (Fidelitas, Hungary), Christina Balaska (ONNED, Greece), Eileen Lynch (YFG, Ireland), Arba Kokalari (MUF, Sweden), Lídia Pereira (JSD, Portugal), Inna Korsun (YDA, Ukraine), Karlo Ressler (MHDZ, Croatia), Marcello Gamberale Paoletti (FIG, Italy), Stephan Beer (JU, Germany)

== Board members (2015–2017) ==
- YEPP President Konstantinos Kyranakis (ONNED, Greece)
- YEPP First Vice-president Roland Mittmann (JU, Germany)
- YEPP Secretary General Andrea Vodanović (MHDZ, Croatia)
- YEPP Deputy Secretary General Christodoulos Ioannou (NEDISY, Cyprus)
- YEPP Treasurer Maru Pardal (NNGG, Spain)
- YEPP Vice-presidents: Bartosz Domaszewicz (SMD, Poland), Pierre-Henri Dumont (JR, France), Csaba Faragó (Fidelitas, Hungary), Andrianos Giannou (TDL, Romania), Arba Kokalari (MUF, Sweden), João Paulo Meireles (JSD, Portugal), Riccardo Pozzi (GUDC, Italy), Stefan Schnöll (JVP, Austria), Tore Storehaug (KrFU, Norway)

== Board members (2013–2015) ==
- YEPP President Konstantinos Kyranakis (ONNED, Greece)
- YEPP Secretary General Colm Lauder (YFG, Ireland)
- YEPP First Vice-president Juha-Pekka Nurvala (KNL, Finland)
- YEPP Deputy Secretary General Federico Potočnik (MSI, Slovenia)
- YEPP Treasurer Frank Visser (CDJA, Netherlands)
- YEPP Vice-presidents: Stefan Schnöll (Junge ÖVP, Austria) Tom Vandenkendelaere (JONG CD&V, Belgium) Hristo Gadzhev (MGERB, Bulgaria) Christodoulos Ioannou (NEDISY, Cyprus) Linda Eichler (IRLY, Estonia) Benedict Pöttering (JU, Germany) Riccardo Pozzi (Giovani UDC, Italy) João Paulo Meireles (JSD, Portugal) Sara Skyttedal (KDU, Sweden)

== Board members (2011–2013) ==
- YEPP President Csaba Dömötör (Fidelitas, Hungary)
- YEPP Secretary General Juha-Pekka Nurvala (KNL, Finland)
- YEPP First Vice-president Duarte Marques (JSD, Portugal)
- YEPP Deputy Secretary General Colm Lauder (YFG, Ireland)
- YEPP Treasurer Frank Lambermont (CDJA, Netherlands)
- YEPP Vice-presidents: Reinhard Bärnthaler (Junge OVP, Austria), Charalambos Stavrides (NEDISY, Cyprus), Benedict Pöttering (JU, Germany), Konstantinos Kyranakis (ONNED, Greece), Emanuele Occhipinti (GL, Italy), Gunārs Elksnis (YLPP, Latvia), Ryan Callus (MZPN, Malta), Andrea Levy Soler (NNGG, Spain), Sara Skyttedal (KDU, Sweden)
- YEPP Financial Auditors: Oliver Jung (Jeunes cdH, Belgium), Riccardo Pozzi (Giovani UDC, Italy)

== Board members (2009–2011) ==
- YEPP President Laurent Schouteten (Jeunes UMP, France)
- YEPP Secretary General Carlo De Romanis (FIG, Italy)
- YEPP First Vice-president Thomas Schneider (JU, Germany)
- YEPP Deputy Secretary General Brenda Furniere (JONGCD&V, Belgium)
- YEPP Treasurer Julian Farner-Calvert (KRFU, Norway)
- YEPP Vice-presidents: Caesar Andres (JCVP, Switzerland), Gernot Blümel (Junge ÖVP, Austria), Csaba Dömötör (Fidelitas, Hungary), Paula Gomez de la Barcena Ansorena (NN.GG, Spain), Melita Kelenc (MSI, Slovenia), Anatolii Korol (DA, Ukraine), Duarte Marques (JSD, Portugal), Juha-Pekka Nurvala (KNL, Finland), Bronne Pot (CDJA, Netherlands)
- YEPP Financial Auditors Petr Jurčík (MKD, Czech Republic), Michael Clancy (YFG, Ireland)

== Board members (2007–2009) ==
- YEPP President Yannis Smyrlis (ONNED, Greece)
- YEPP Secretary General Martin Hümer (JVP, Austria)
- YEPP First Vice-president Thomas Schneider (JU, Germany)
- YEPP Deputy Secretary General Huibert van Rossum (CDJA, Netherlands)
- YEPP Treasurer Sigbjørn Aanes (UHL, Norway)
- YEPP Vice-presidents: Irina Pruidze (AME, Georgia), Laurent Schouteten (Jeunes UMP, France), Carlo de Romanis (FIG, Italy), James Lawless (YFG, Ireland), Vaidas Augunas (JKD, Lithuania), Paula Gómez de la Bárcena Ansorena (NNGG, Spain), Daniel Fangueiro (JSD, Portugal), Charlie Weimers (KDU, Sweden), Darija Jurica (MHDZ, Croatia)

== Board members (2005–2007) ==
- YEPP President David Hansen (KrFU, Norway)
- YEPP Secretary General Martin Hümer (JVP, Austria)
- YEPP First Vice-president Robert Golanski (MD, Poland)
- YEPP Deputy Secretary General Huibert van Rossum (CDJA, Netherlands)
- YEPP Vice-presidents: David Cermak (MKD, Czech Republic), Paula Gómez de la Bárcena Ansorena (NNGG, Spain), Galina Fomenchenko (CDMU, Ukraine), Christian Holm (MUF, Sweden), Christoph Israng (JU, Germany), Stefano Morelli (FIG, Italy), Vincent Richez (Jeunes Populaires, France), Yannis Smyrlis (ONNED, Greece), Jeroen van den Berghe (Jong CD&V, Belgium)

== Board members (2003–2005) ==
- YEPP President Daniel Bautista (NNGG, Spain)
- YEPP Secretary General Riika Railimo (former Kervinen) (KNL, Finland)
- YEPP First Vice-president Markus Pösentrup (JU, Germany)
- YEPP Deputy Secretary General Lucinda Creighton (YFG, Ireland)
- YEPP Vice-presidents: Paolo Zanetto (FIG, Italy), Bernhard Pircher (JVP Austria), Maria Syrengela (ONNED, Greece), Arnoud Strijbis (CDJA, Netherlands), Arnt Kennis (Jong CD&V, Belgium), John Bonello (MZPN, Malta), Timotej Neubauer (NG SLS, Slovenia), Pedro Duarte (JSD, Portugal)

== Board members (2001–2003) ==
- YEPP President Rutger-Jan Hebben (CDJA, Netherlands)
- YEPP Secretary General Markus Pösentrup (JU, Germany)
- YEPP First Vice-president Daniel Bautista (NNGG, Spain)
- YEPP Deputy Secretary General Riika Railimo (former Kervinen) (KNL, Finland)
- YEPP Vice-presidents: Sidonia Jedrzejewska (MD, Poland), Maria Syrengela (ONNED, Greece), Aidas Palubinskas (JKD, Lithuania), Arnt Kennis (Jong CD&V, Belgium), Alex Widmer (JCVP, Switzerland), Miguel Coleta (JSD, Portugal), David Hansen (KrFU, Norway), Leo Varadkar (YFG, Ireland), Alessia Mosca (UDC, Italy)

== Board members (1999–2001) ==
- YEPP President Michael Hahn (JU, Germany)
- YEPP Secretary General Rutger-Jan Hebben (CDJA, Netherlands)
- YEPP First Vice-president Belen Ureña (NNGG, Spain)
- YEPP Deputy Secretary General Eva Mitsopoulou (ONNED, Greece)
- YEPP Vice-presidents: Niklas Claesson (MUF, Sweden), Yannick Georges (Jeunes PSC, Belgium), Sidonia Jedrzejewska (MD, Poland), Jyrki Katainen (KNL, Finland), Stephen McCullen (YFG, Ireland), Aidas Palubinskas (JKD, Lithuania), Alina Bita (PNTCD-OT, Romania), Martin Ledolter (JVP, Austria), José Eduarto Martins (JSD, Portugal)

== Board members (1997–1999) ==
- YEPP President Fredrik Reinfeldt (MUF, Sweden)
- YEPP Secretary General Walter Verbeke (CVP-Jongeren, Belgium)
- YEPP First Vice-president Winfried Weck (JU, Germany)
- YEPP Deputy Secretary General Jan-Kees de Jager (CDJA, Netherlands)
- YEPP Vice-presidents: Joanne Harmon (YFG, Ireland), Eva Mitsopoulou (ONNED, Greece), André Støylen (UHL, Norway), Belen Ureña (NNGG, Spain), Martin Ledolter (JVP, Austria), Evarts Anosovs (Former LKDJS, Latvia), Yannick Georges (Jeunes PSC, Belgium), Mikolaj Dowgielewicz (MD, Poland), Peter Stach (KDMS, Slovakia), José Eduarto Martins (JSD, Portugal)

== Member organisations ==
Albania

- Youth Forum of the Democratic Party (FR-PD)

Austria

- Junge ÖVP (JÖVP)

Belgium

- JM Ostbelgien
- JONG Christen-Democratisch & Vlaams (JONGCD&V)

Bosnia and Herzegovina

- Youth Association of SDA (YA SDA)
- Mladež Hrvatske demokratske zajednice Bosne i Hercegovine (MHDZ BiH)

Bulgaria

- Young citizens for European Development of Bulgaria (MGERB)

Croatia

- Mladež Hrvatske demokratske zajednice (Mladež HDZ, MHDZ)

Cyprus

- Youth Organisation of the Democratic Rally (NE.DI.SY)

Czech Republic

- Mladí Lidovci (ML)
- TOP Tým

Denmark

- Konservativ Ungdom (KU)

Estonia

- Isamaa ja Res Publica Liidu Noorteuhendus (IRLY)

Finland

- Suomen Kristillisdemokraattiset Nuoret (KDN)
- Kokoomuksen Nuorten Liitto (KNL)

France

- Les Jeunes Républicains (LJR)

Georgia

- United Youth National Movement (UYNM)

Germany

- Junge Union Deutschlands (JU)

Greece

- Organossi Neon Neas Demokratias (ONNED)

Hungary

- Young Christian Democratic Union (IKSZ)

Ireland

- Young Fine Gael (YFG)

Italy

- Forza Italia Giovani (FIG)
- Junge Generation in der Südtiroler Volkspartei (JG SVP)
- Movimento Giovanile del Partito Autonomista Trentino Tirolese (Giovani PATT)

Latvia

- Vienotība Jaunatnes organizācija (VJO)

Luxembourg

- Chrëschtlech-Sozial Jugend (CSJ)

North Macedonia

- Youth Forces Union of VMRO-DPMNE (ВМРО – Демократска партија за Македонско национално единство; VMRO-DPMNE)

Malta

- Youth Movement of the Nationalist Party (Moviment Żgħażagħ Partit Nazzjonalista; MZPN)

Moldova

- Youth of Partidul Acțiune și Solidaritate (PAS Youth)

Netherlands

- Christen Democratisch Jongeren Appel (CDJA)
- PerspectieF – Christen Unie-jongeren (PerspectieF)

Norway

- Unge Høyres Landsforbund (UHL)
- Kristelig Folkepartis Ungdom (KrFU)

Portugal

- Juventude Social Democrata (JSD)
- Juventude Popular (Portugal) (JP Portugal)

Romania

- Tineretul Național Liberal (TNL)
- Magyar Ifjúsági Értekezlet (MIERT)

San Marino

- Giovani Democratico Cristiani (GDC San Marino)

Serbia

- Unija mladih Srpske napredne stranke (UMSNS)
- Forum mladih Saveza vojvođanskih Mađara (YFAVH)

Slovakia

- Kresťanskodemokratická mládež Slovenska (KDMS)

Slovenia

- Nova generacija SLS (NG SLS)
- Slovenska Demokratska Mladina (SDM)
- Mlada Slovenija (MSi)

Spain

- Nueves Generaciones del Partido Popular (NNGG)

Sweden

- Kristdemokratiska Ungdomsförbundet (KDU)
- Moderata Ungdomsförbundet (MUF)

Switzerland

- JM Switzerland

Ukraine

- Batkivshchyna moloda (BM)
- Youth of the Democratic Alliance (DA)
- All-Ukrainian Youth Public Organisation "Young Rukh" (Young Rukh)
- Solidarna Molod (SM)
