= Youth of the Croatian Democratic Union =

Youth of the Croatian Democratic Union Mladež Hrvatske Demokratske zajednice
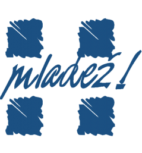
- President: Maksimilijan Šimrak
- Founded: 13 September 1990
- Headquarters: Trg žrtava fašizma 4, Zagreb
- Ideology: Christian democracy Conservatism; Pro-Europeanism
- Mother party: Croatian Democratic Union
- International affiliation: International Young Democracy Union
- European affiliation: Youth of the European People's Party
- Website: mhdz.hr

The Youth of the Croatian Democratic Union (Croatian: Mladež Hrvatske demokratske zajednice), abbreviated to MHDZ, is the youth organisation of the Croatian Democratic Union. To be a member, one has to be between 16 and 30 years old. The MHDZ was founded on 13 September 1990.

== International relations ==
The MHDZ is member of the Youth of the European People's Party (YEPP), a European umbrella organisation of Christian democratic and conservative youth organisations of Europe, the Democrat Youth Community of Europe (DEMYC) and the international umbrella organisation International Young Democrat Union (IYDU).

== Chairpersons ==
- Mario Kapulica (1990–1998), MP 1995–1999
- Krunoslav Gašparić (1998–2001; 2002), MP 2000–2003
- Tonči Zoričić (2001–2002)
- Margareta Mađerić (2002–2007)
- Mislav Banek (2007–2011)
- Marina Banić (2011–2012)
- Maksimilijan Šimrak (2012–present)
