= 2020 Iași County local elections =

- 27 September 2020
- Turnout: 37.27%

	First party	Second party
Party	PNL	PSD
Seats before	12	17
Seats won	17	10
Seat change	▲5	▼7
Popular vote	107,103	66,079
Percentage	39.70%	24.49%
	Third party	Fourth party
Party	USR PLUS	PMP
Seats before	-	3
Seats won	6	3
Seat change	New	Steady
Popular vote	39,416	16,635
Percentage	14.61%	6.17%
President before election
Maricel Popa
PSD
Elected President
Costel Alexe
PNL

The 2020 Iași County local elections were held on 27 September. The offices of local councilors, mayors, county councilors and the President of the County Council were up for election.

== County Council elections ==
President of the County Council
Party	Candidate	Votes	Votes %
National Liberal Party	Costel Alexe	104,656	37.97
Social Democratic Party	Maricel Popa	79,168	28.72
USR-PLUS Alliance	Marius Bodea	41,271	14.97
People's Movement Party	Petru Movilă	17,564	6.37
PRO Romania	Răzvan-Bogdan Abalași	9,146	3.32
Green Party	Gică-Sebastian Tataru	7,230	2.62
Alliance of Liberals and Democrats	Costel Irimia	5,195	1.88
Alliance for the Union of Romanians	Ioan Pădureț	4,054	1.47
Others		7,356	2.67
Total		275,640	100

Party composition of the County Council
Party	Votes	Votes %	Seats	Change
National Liberal Party	107,103	39.70	17	▲5
Social Democratic Party	66,079	24.49	10	▼7
USR-PLUS Alliance	39,416	14.61	6	New
People's Movement Party	16,635	6.17	3	Steady
Others	40,569	15.03	0	▼5
Total	269,802	100	36	N/A

== Local councils elections ==
Party composition of the local councils
Party	Votes	Votes %	Seats
National Liberal Party	102,263	36.94	572
Social Democratic Party	80,153	28.95	515
People's Movement Party	18,093	6.53	98
USR-PLUS Alliance	37,726	13.63	68
PRO Romania	11,485	4.14	43
Green Party	6,985	2.52	21
Alliance of Liberals and Democrats	5,309	1.91	14
Ecologist Party of Romania	1,497	0.54	4
Social Liberal Humanist Party	1,302	0.47	4
Independent	2,985	1.07	4
Others	8,988	3.25	17
Total	276,786	100	1360

== Mayoral elections ==
Results of mayoral elections in Iași County by party
Party	Votes	Votes %	Mayors
National Liberal Party	119,429	42.26	50
Social Democratic Party	83,526	29.56	43
USR-PLUS Alliance	38,319	13.56	3
People's Movement Party	13,166	4.66	1
Independent	2,766	0.98	1
Others	25,367	8.98	0
Total	282,573	100	98
