= Ilir Alimehmeti =

Albanian physician, academic, and politician (born 1979)

- Born: 13 September 1979 (age 46); Tirana, PSR Albania
- Education: University of Medicine, Tirana; Erasmus University Rotterdam
- Occupations: Physician, academic, politician
- Years active: 2001–present
- Known for: Clinical epidemiology, public health policy
- Political party: Democratic Party of Albania

Ilir Alimehmeti (born 13 September 1979) is an Albanian physician, academic and politician. He has served as an associate professor, and as head of the Department of Family Medicine and Occupational Diseases at the University of Medicine, Tirana. He is a member of the Permanent Health Commission of the Academy of Sciences of Albania and a member of the National Council of the Democratic Party of Albania.

== Early life and education ==
Alimehmeti was born in Tirana on 13 September 1979 to a family of doctors.

He completed his higher studies at the University of Medicine, Tirana. He then pursued postgraduate training in endocrinology in Albania and in clinical epidemiology at Erasmus University Rotterdam in the Netherlands. He also earned a doctorate in clinical medicine in Albania.

== Academic and professional career ==
Alimehmeti has held several academic and administrative positions at the University of Medicine, Tirana, including:

- Associate Professor
- Academic Senator
- Head of the Department of Family Medicine and Occupational Diseases
- Member of the Health Commission of the Academy of Sciences of Albania

His research and teaching focus on epidemiology, infectious diseases, and preventive medicine.

During the COVID-19 pandemic, Alimehmeti appeared in Albanian media to provide public analysis on vaccination, health restrictions, and public health measures.

== Publications and research ==
Alimehmeti has authored and co-authored academic papers in the fields of clinical epidemiology, public health, and cardiovascular medicine, including studies on COVID-19 transmission, noncommunicable diseases, and health inequalities.

== Political involvement ==
Alimehmeti is an active member of the Democratic Party of Albania, where he has held several positions, including:

- Head of the Health Department
- Member of the National Council
- Leader of the Democratic Party municipal councillors in the Tirana City Council

In the 2025 Albanian parliamentary election, he was a candidate for parliament in the Tirana district on behalf of the Democratic Party.

In 2022, he also ran in the Democratic Party primaries for the mayoral race in Tirana, alongside Belind Këlliçi and Gerti Bogdani.

== Personal life ==
He is married to a physician, and they have two daughters.
