= Boris Ažaltovič =

Former State Secretary of the Ministry of Labour, Social Affairs and Family of the Slovak Republic
- In office 1 July 2020 – 31 March 2022
- Prime Minister: Igor Matovič; Eduard Heger
- Preceded by: Jozef Mihál
- Succeeded by: Juraj Káčer

Chairman of the Christian Democratic Youth of Slovakia
- In office 2000–2002
- Preceded by: Jana Tutková
- Succeeded by: Mária Majdová

Personal details
- Born: 16 July 1978 (age 48) Michalovce, Czechoslovakia
- Party: KDH
- Education: Pan-European University

Boris Ažaltovič (born 16 July 1978) is a Slovak politician, lawyer and manager who served as the State Secretary of the Ministry of Labour, Social Affairs and Family of the Slovak Republic until March 2022.

== Biography ==
Ažaltovič was born on 16 July 1978 in Michalovce. He studied at Pavol Horov Gymnasium in Michalovce, then pursued law studies at the Bratislava School of Law in Bratislava. From 1999 to 2002, he held various positions at the Ministry of Justice of the Slovak Republic under Ján Čarnogurský, including assistant to the head of the civil service office Daniel Lipšic. Subsequently, from 2002 to 2006, he was the spokesperson for the minister of the interior Vladimír Palko. In 2006, he called for the resignation of Pavol Hrušovský as chairman of the Christian Democratic Movement, of which he was a member. From 2006 to 2020, he worked as a manager and executive in various companies. Since 2020, he worked at the Ministry of Labour, initially as the general secretary of the civil service office, and from July 2020 as State Secretary. He left the ministry at his own request on 31 March 2022, citing the repeated postponement of the pension reform by the ruling coalition as the main reason.

Ažaltovič was also chairman of the Christian Democratic Youth of Slovakia from 2000 to 2002. Since 2018, he has been a local councilor in the Old Town district of Bratislava, elected for a coalition of SaS, OĽANO, KDH, We Are Family, NOVA, OKS, and ZZ-DÚ. Since 2010, Ažaltovič has been organizing the classical music concerts Gesamtkunstwerk in Bratislava.
