= FRPD =

FRPD may refer to:

- Federal Reserve Police
- Forumi Rinor i Partise Demokratike
