= National Liberal Youth (Romania) =

National Liberal Youth Tineretul Național Liberal
- President: Mara Mareș
- Vice President: Adrian Ștef (First vice president); Adrian Atomei, Horia Carțiș, Alin Drăgulin, Victor Ionescu, Paul Olteanu, Ionuț Stroe, Bogdan Țîmpău, Vasile Brumă, George Dumitrică, Mircea Fechet, Ciprian Jichici, Ionel Spătaru, Cătălin Tudosă
- Secretary General: Răzvan Pop
- Founded: 1876
- Headquarters: B-dul Aviatorilor, nr. 86, Sector 1, Bucharest
- Mother party: National Liberal Party (PNL)
- International affiliation: IFLRY
- LYMEC affiliation: March 2002
- Initiative of South East European Liberals (ISEEL) affiliation: 2003, founding member
- Website: http://www.tnl.ro/

The National Liberal Youth (Romanian: Tineretul Național Liberal, TNL) is the youth organisation of the National Liberal Party (PNL) of Romania. It is a nationwide body, as part of the PNL local, county and national organisations.
