= Natalia-Elena Intotero =

Romanian politician (born 1976)

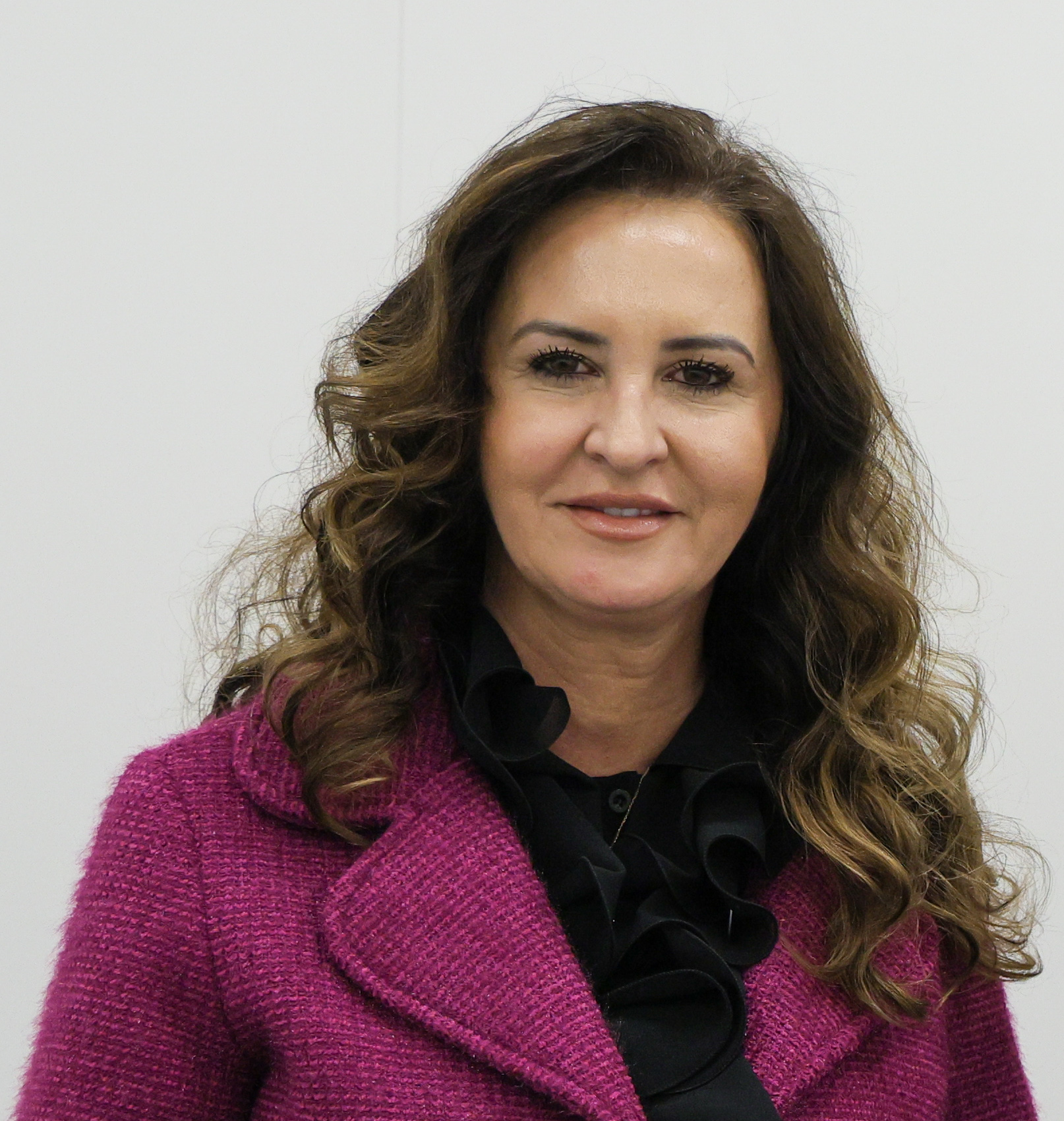
- Intotero in 2025

Minister of Environment, Water and Forests
- Incumbent
- Assumed office 20 October 2026
- Prime Minister: Luca Niculescu
- Preceded by: Diana Buzoianu

Minister of Culture
- In office 23 December 2024 – 23 June 2025
- Prime Minister: Marcel Ciolacu; Cătălin Predoiu (acting)
- Preceded by: Raluca Turcan
- Succeeded by: András István Demeter

Minister of Family, Youth and Equality of Opportunity
- In office 19 July 2023 – 23 December 2024
- Prime Minister: Marcel Ciolacu
- Preceded by: Gabriela Firea
- Succeeded by: Position abolished

Personal details
- Born: January 14, 1976 (age 50) Brad, Hunedoara County, Romania
- Party: Social Democratic Party (PSD)
- Education: University of Bucharest, West University of Timișoara

Natalia-Elena Intotero (born 14 January 1976) is a Romanian politician from the Social Democratic Party (PSD) formerly serving as Minister of Culture and as Minister of Family, Youth and Equality of Opportunity.

== Life ==
In 1995 she graduated from the "Sabin Dragoi" Pedagogical High School in Deva, and afterward worked part-time, as a teacher at the "Horea, Cloșca and Crișan" General School which is also located in Brad until 2004. Natalia-Elena Intotero studied English language at the West University of Timișoara then studied international relations at the University of Bucharest.

She became the director of the Horea school from 2008 to 2009 after her studies. In March 2009, she became secretary of state in the Ministry of Foreign Affairs. After being secretary, she returned to education as deputy director of the "Avram Iancu" National College until 2011. In 2012 she was briefly again Secretary of State in the Ministry of Foreign Affairs until she became deputy.

She was a member of the Parliament of Romania following the 2012 Romanian parliamentary election and the 2016 Romanian parliamentary election. She is deputy of the Commission for Foreign Policy since December 2012 and vice-president of the PSD Parliamentary Group.

Between January 2018 and April 2019, she was secretary of state for the Romanians living abroad. In 2020 she was proposed for a new mandate as deputy for Hunedoara County, which she successfully won, and soon after she became chairman of the Education Committee in December 2020. During the midst of the COVID-19 pandemic in 2021, she advocated for schools to stay open, saying that classes were closed because of the incapacity of the people who had led the educational system.

On 19 July 2023, she was sworn in as Minister of Family, Youth and Equality of Opportunity in the Ciolacu Cabinet.
