= Lídia Pereira =

Portuguese politician

Lídia Pereira MEP
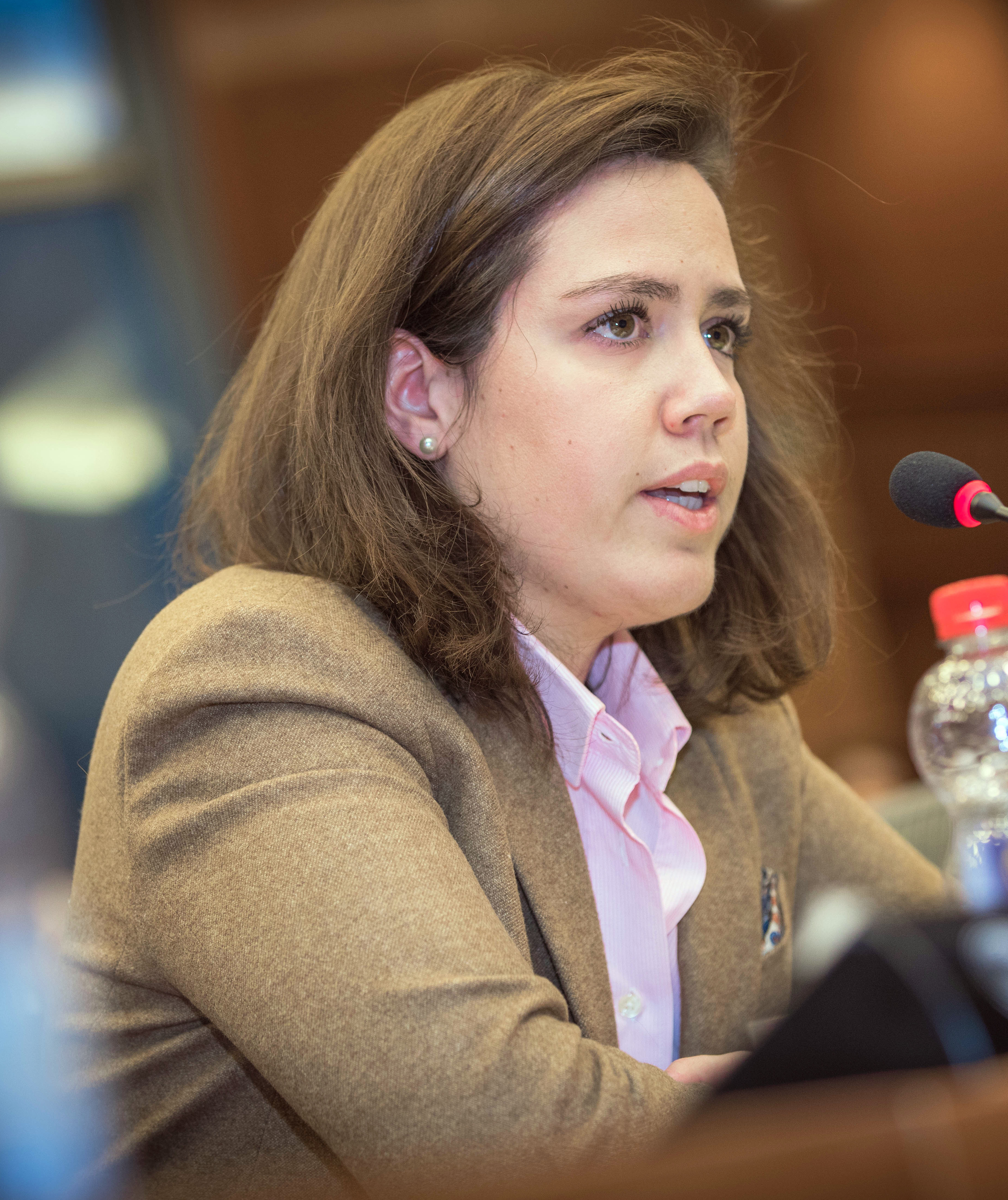
- Lídia Pereira in 2019

Member of the European Parliament for Portugal
- Incumbent
- Assumed office 2 July 2019

President of the Youth of the European People's Party
- In office 2 November 2018 – 12 July 2025
- Preceded by: Andrianos Giannou
- Succeeded by: Sophia Kircher

Personal details
- Born: Ana Lídia Fernandes Oliveira Pereira; 26 July 1991 (age 35) Coimbra, Portugal
- Party: Social Democratic Party
- Education: University of Coimbra
- Occupation: Economist • Politician

Ana Lídia Fernandes Oliveira Pereira (born 26 July 1991) is a Portuguese politician of the Social Democratic Party (PSD) who has been serving as a Member of the European Parliament since 2019.

== Early life and education ==
Pereira has a degree in Economics from the University of Coimbra and a MSc in European Economic Studies from the College of Europe.

She was born in Coimbra.

== Political career ==
Pereira served as president of the Youth of the European People's Party (YEPP) from 2018 until 2025.

In the 2019 European elections Pereira was the first politician to run a carbon neutral political campaign, drawing attention to climate change. As number 2 in the list she stood out as a political renewal of Portuguese MEPs. Since joining the European Parliament, she has been serving as her parliamentary group's deputy coordinator in the Committee on Economic and Monetary Affairs and as member of the Committee on the Environment, Public Health and Food Safety. In 2020, she also joined the Subcommittee on Tax Matters.

In addition to her committee assignments, Pereira is part of the European Parliament Intergroup on Anti-Corruption and the European Parliament Intergroup on Seas, Rivers, Islands and Coastal Areas.

In 2021, Pereira was part of the European Parliament's official delegation to the United Nations Climate Change Conference (COP26).

In June 2023, Pereira was the recipient of the Youth Champion Award at The Parliament Magazine's annual MEP Awards

In April 2024, she was elected vice-president of the EPP group after Paulo Rangel’s departure to the Ministry of Foreign Affairs.

== Other activities ==
- UNITE – Parliamentary Network to End HIV/AIDS, Viral Hepatitis and Other Infectious Diseases, Member (since 2019)
