= Diana Buzoianu =

Romanian politician (born 1994)

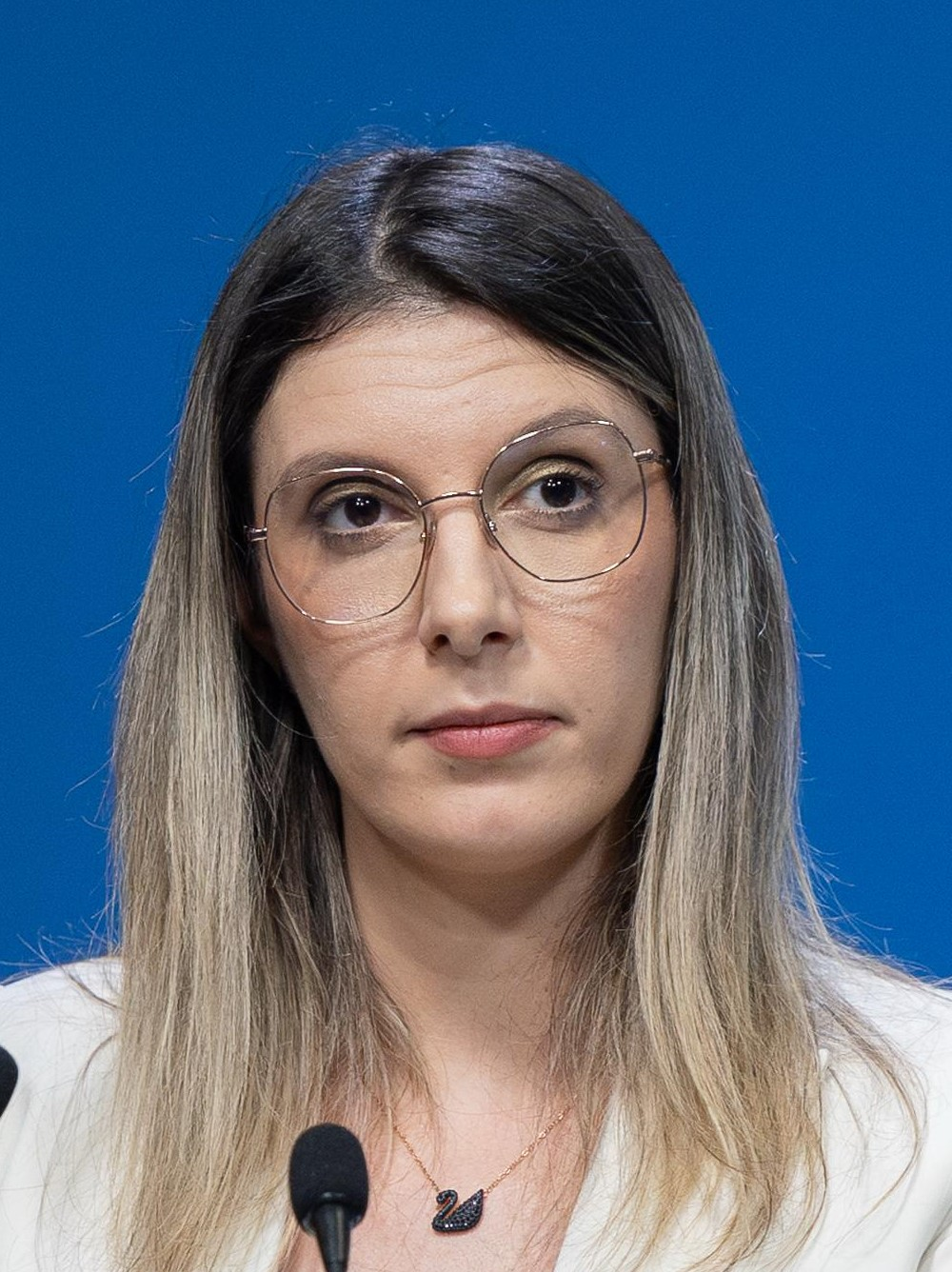
- Buzoianu in 2025

Minister of Environment, Water and Forests
- In office 23 June 2025 – 20 October 2026
- Prime Minister: Ilie Bolojan
- Preceded by: Mircea Fechet
- Succeeded by: Natalia-Elena Intotero

Member of the Chamber of Deputies
- Incumbent
- Assumed office 21 December 2020
- Constituency: Bucharest

Personal details
- Born: Diana Anda Buzoianu; 16 May 1994 (age 32) Brașov, Romania
- Party: USR (since 2021); PLUS (until 2021)
- Education: University of Bucharest

Diana Anda Buzoianu (born 16 May 1994) is a Romanian politician and lawyer who served as the Minister of Environment from 2025 to 2026.

A member of the Save Romania Union (USR), she represents Bucharest and is focused on environmental protection, digitalisation, and legislative transparency. Prior to joining USR in 2021, Buzoianu was the leader of the Freedom, Unity and Solidarity Party (PLUS) in Sector 1 of Bucharest.

== Early life and education ==
Born in Brașov, Romania, Buzoianu grew up in Slobozia, where she attended the Mihai Viteazu National College. She graduated from the Faculty of Law at the University of Bucharest in 2017, and became a member of the Bucharest Bar the same year.

In 2018, Buzoianu earned the Certified Information Privacy Professional (CIPP/E) certification from the International Association of Privacy Professionals (IAPP). From 2017 to 2019, she completed courses at the National Institute for the Training and Improvement of Lawyers (INPPA).

== Professional career ==
Before entering politics, Buzoianu worked as a lawyer at Reff & Associates (Deloitte Romania) from 2017 to 2020, specialising in data protection, commercial law, and real estate law. In 2018, she published a legal article on physical security in the context of GDPR in the Romanian Journal of Business Law.

Buzoianu also served as a speaker at data protection conferences organized by Wolters Kluwer in 2018 and 2019. During her university years, she founded a Romanian chapter of NILS (The Network for International Law Students), focusing on human rights.

== Political career ==
=== Deputy ===
Elected to the Chamber of Deputies in 2020 and re-elected in 2024, Buzoianu served as a deputy representing Bucharest. During her parliamentary tenure, she focused on environmental protection, digitalisation, and institutional reform.

She served as President of the Environment and Ecological Balance Committee and was a member of the Information Technology and Communications Committee. In these roles, she was an advocate for environmental governance reform and the modernisation of public administration.

Buzoianu initiated and co-initiated numerous legislative proposals across areas including education, labour law, public health, taxation, environmental protection, and digital infrastructure. Notable adopted legislation includes the Law on Interoperability (Law No. 242/2022), aimed at improving digital public services; the Digital Nomads Law (Law No. 22/2022), facilitating residence and work arrangements for remote workers; and amendments to legislation governing employment relations, fiscal policy, and the use of Black Sea beaches.

She also sponsored legislative initiatives that were not adopted, including proposals to dissolve the Academy of Romanian Scientists and the Institute of the Romanian Revolution of December 1989. Other initiatives, such as legislation on the management of pharmaceutical waste originating from households and the protection of remarkable trees, remained under parliamentary debate.

Beyond legislative activity, Buzoianu was publicly critical of deficiencies in Romania’s environmental monitoring infrastructure, particularly the lack of maintenance of air quality monitoring stations. She also advocated for the restructuring of Romsilva, Romania’s state forestry agency, and initiated legal action against RA-APPS to compel the disclosure of beneficiaries of state-owned properties, citing the need for greater transparency.

==== Legislative initiatives ====
No.	Year	Title	Outcome
1	2021	Amendment of Article 202(1)(b) of the National Education Law No. 1/2011	Adopted – Law No. 9/2022
2	2021	Amendment to Law No. 55/2020 on measures to combat the COVID-19 pandemic	Adopted – Law No. 221/2021
3	2021	Amendments to normative acts regarding employment relations	Adopted – Law No. 269/2021
4	2021	Amendment of Government Emergency Ordinance No. 19/2006 on the use of Black Sea beaches	Adopted – Law No. 56/2022
5	2021	Amendment of the legal regime of foreigners in Romania	Adopted – Law No. 22/2022
6	2021	Amendment of the Fiscal Code (Article 291(3))	Adopted – Law No. 291/2021
7	2021	Introduction of modern payment systems	Adopted – Law No. 128/2022
8	2021	Amendment of Government Emergency Ordinance No. 44/2008 on the economic activities of authorised natural persons (PFA)	Adopted – Law No. 125/2022
9	2022	Amendment of the Labour Code (Article 34)	Adopted – Law No. 144/2022
10	2022	Management of pharmaceutical waste originating from the population	Under parliamentary debate
11	2021	Dissolution of the Academy of Romanian Scientists	Definitively rejected
12	2021	Dissolution of the Institute of the Romanian Revolution of December 1989	Legislative procedure terminated

For the complete list of legislative initiatives, see the official page of the Chamber of Deputies.

=== Minister of Environment ===
==== Nomination ====
On 21 June 2025, Buzoianu was voted by USR as their proposal for the Minister of Environment in the upcoming Ilie Bolojan cabinet. Following the formal hearings, she was officially sworn in by president Nicușor Dan two days later.

==== Appointment ====
In June 2025, Buzoianu became one of two women appointed to the cabinet led by Prime Minister Ilie Bolojan. She was appointed Minister of the Environment, Waters and Forests on 23 June 2025.

As part of her ministerial team, she appointed two honorary advisers: Laura Bouriaud, a university lecturer specialising in forest policy, and Florin Stoican, a geologist and co-founder of Buila-Vânturarița National Park and the Văcărești Nature Park.

==== Declared priorities and policy directions ====
In interviews and public statements, Buzoianu identified several strategic priorities, including increasing forested areas, combating desertification, ensuring the responsible management of the brown bear population, and implementing environmental targets assumed under the National Recovery and Resilience Plan (PNRR).

Additional stated objectives included reforming governance in the forestry sector, as well as improving the efficiency and oversight of state-owned companies under the ministry’s authority.

==== Measures and initiatives ====
Among the first measures announced after taking office were the appointment of two honorary advisers specialising in environmental protection and biodiversity, and the launch of a process to update national policies on brown bear population management, based on a nationwide study coordinated by the ministry.

The ministry also announced the continuation of more than 500 projects related to water supply, sewerage, and waste management, alongside the installation of over 1,100 electric protection systems intended to mitigate human–wildlife conflict.

In the latter half of 2025, Buzoianu’s tenure as Minister of the Environment was marked by several regulatory and policy actions addressing environmental protection, biodiversity, and public safety. In November 2025, the Romanian government adopted an emergency ordinance aimed at reducing risks associated with the presence of brown bears in and around populated areas. The measure introduced fines for feeding wild bears and empowered local emergency commissions to decide appropriate interventions when bears enter settlements, including deterrence, tranquillisation, relocation or, in extreme cases, euthanasia, depending on the severity of the situation.

During the same period, Buzoianu oversaw the publication of results from Romania’s first nationwide scientific assessment of the brown bear population, based on genetic sampling and habitat analysis. The study, presented at a conference in Brașov, provided estimates of between approximately 10,657 and 12,787 bears and included a national zoning framework for differentiated management strategies across the country. Ministry officials described the findings as a foundation for future policy decisions aimed at reconciling conservation needs with public safety and informed wildlife management frameworks aligned with wider European standards.

At the European level, Buzoianu participated in meetings of the Environment Council, where she discussed bloc-wide climate and environmental objectives, including negotiations on long-term greenhouse gas reduction targets. In these engagements, she advocated for flexibility in implementation, emphasising the need for environmental policies that recognise national economic and social conditions, particularly for member states facing structural and regional disparities.

In response to severe weather events in late 2025, the Ministry of the Environment convened inter-institutional meetings to coordinate emergency preparedness and public alerts. In October 2025, Buzoianu chaired a meeting national in scope following severe weather warnings, working with meteorological and civil protection authorities to enhance preparedness across multiple counties and to issue timely public communications.

==== Criticism and parliamentary scrutiny ====
In December 2025, Buzoianu became the subject of a simple motion adopted by the Senate, criticising aspects of the ministry’s handling of environmental and infrastructure issues. While such motions have no legal effect on a minister’s position, the episode led to increased public and political scrutiny of her policies. Buzoianu rejected calls for resignation, describing the motion as politically motivated and stating that she would continue the ministry’s reform agenda.
