= Mara Mareș =

Romanian politician (born 1992)

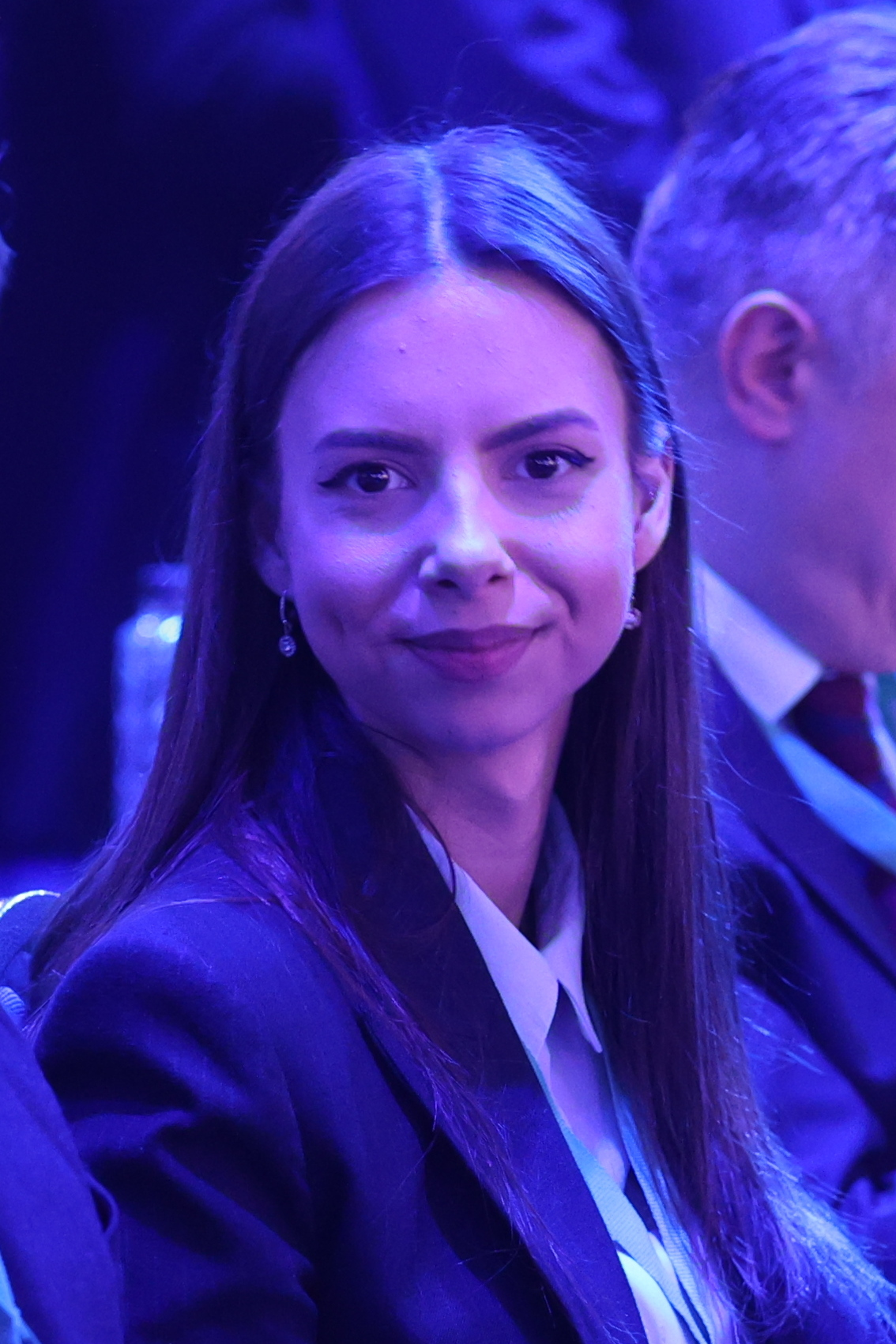
- Mareș in 2024

Member of the Chamber of Deputies
- Incumbent
- Assumed office 18 October 2023
- Preceded by: Pavel Popescu
- Constituency: Bucharest
- In office 11 December 2016 – 6 December 2020
- Constituency: Brașov

President of the National Liberal Youth
- Incumbent
- Assumed office 22 October 2017
- Preceded by: Costel Alexe; Sorin-Dan Moldovan

Personal details
- Born: 5 June 1992 (age 34)
- Party: National Liberal Party

Mara Mareș (born 5 June 1992) is a Romanian politician of the National Liberal Party. She has been a member of the Chamber of Deputies since 2023, having previously served from 2016 to 2020. Since 2017, she has served as president of the National Liberal Youth.
