= Christian Democratic Youth of Slovakia =

Slovak youth organization

Christian Democratic Youth of Slovakia Kresťanskodemokratická mládež Slovenska
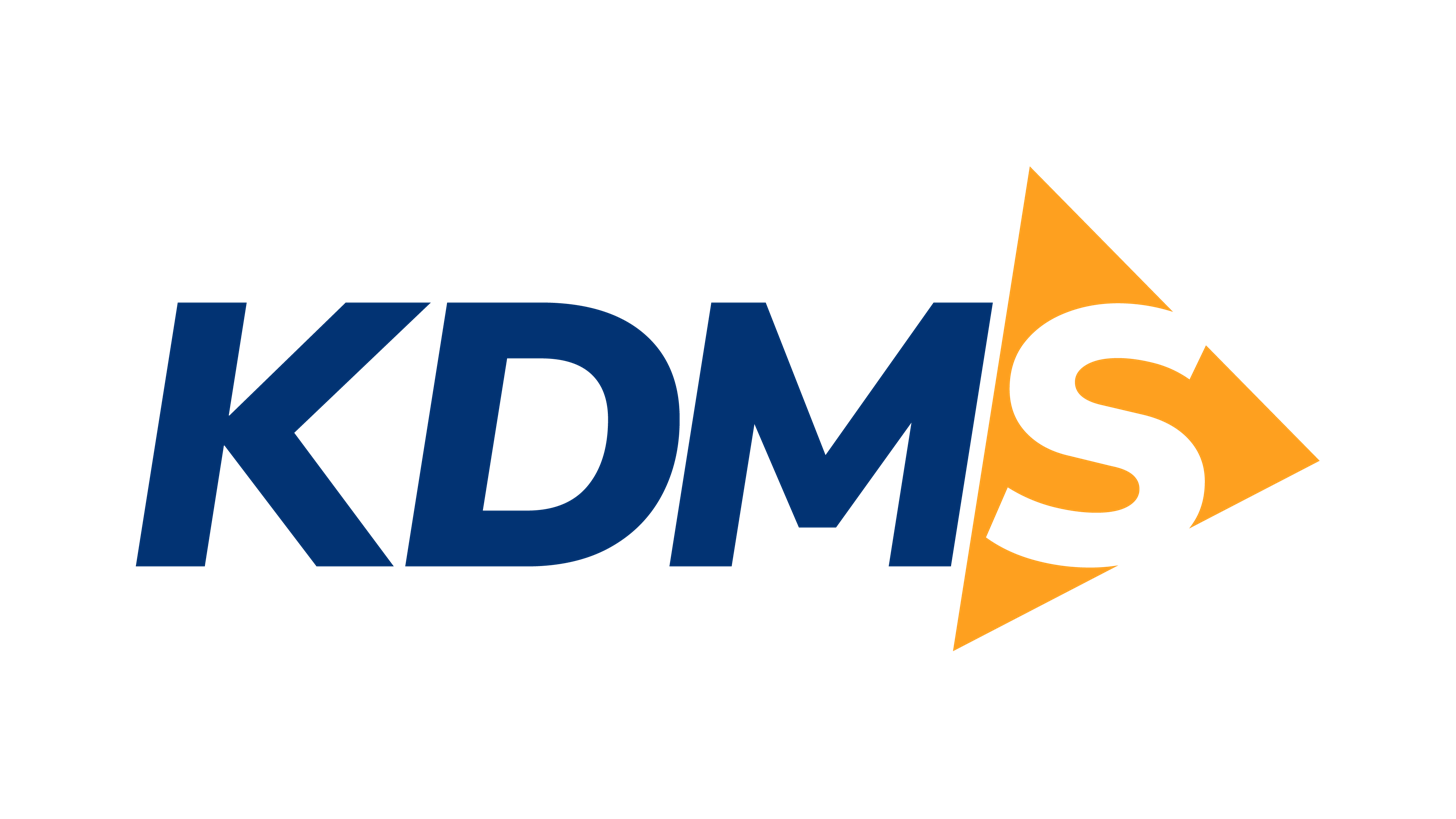
- Chairman: Adam Bátovský
- Secretary General: Matúš Lukačka
- Founded: 1990
- Headquarters: Staromestská 596/6D, 81103 Bratislava
- Membership: 400 (2015)
- Ideology: Christian democracy Conservatism; Economic liberalism Pro-Europeanism
- Position: Centre-right
- Colours: white, blue, red, black, cyan, purple
- Mother party: Christian Democratic Movement
- International affiliation: International Young Democrat Union
- European affiliation: Youth of the European People's Party
- Website: kdms.sk

The Kresťanskodemokratická mládež Slovenska (Christian Democratic Youth of Slovakia) or KDMS is the youth organisation of the conservative Slovak political party, KDH. They share the same ideological platform with the KDH: a centre-right ideology, Christian democracy and economic liberalism. Membership focuses on young people aged between 15 and 35, while only those between 18 and 30 eligible to candidate for functions.

KDMS claims to be the largest political youth organization in Slovakia with about 300 members in 2009 and 400 members in 2015.

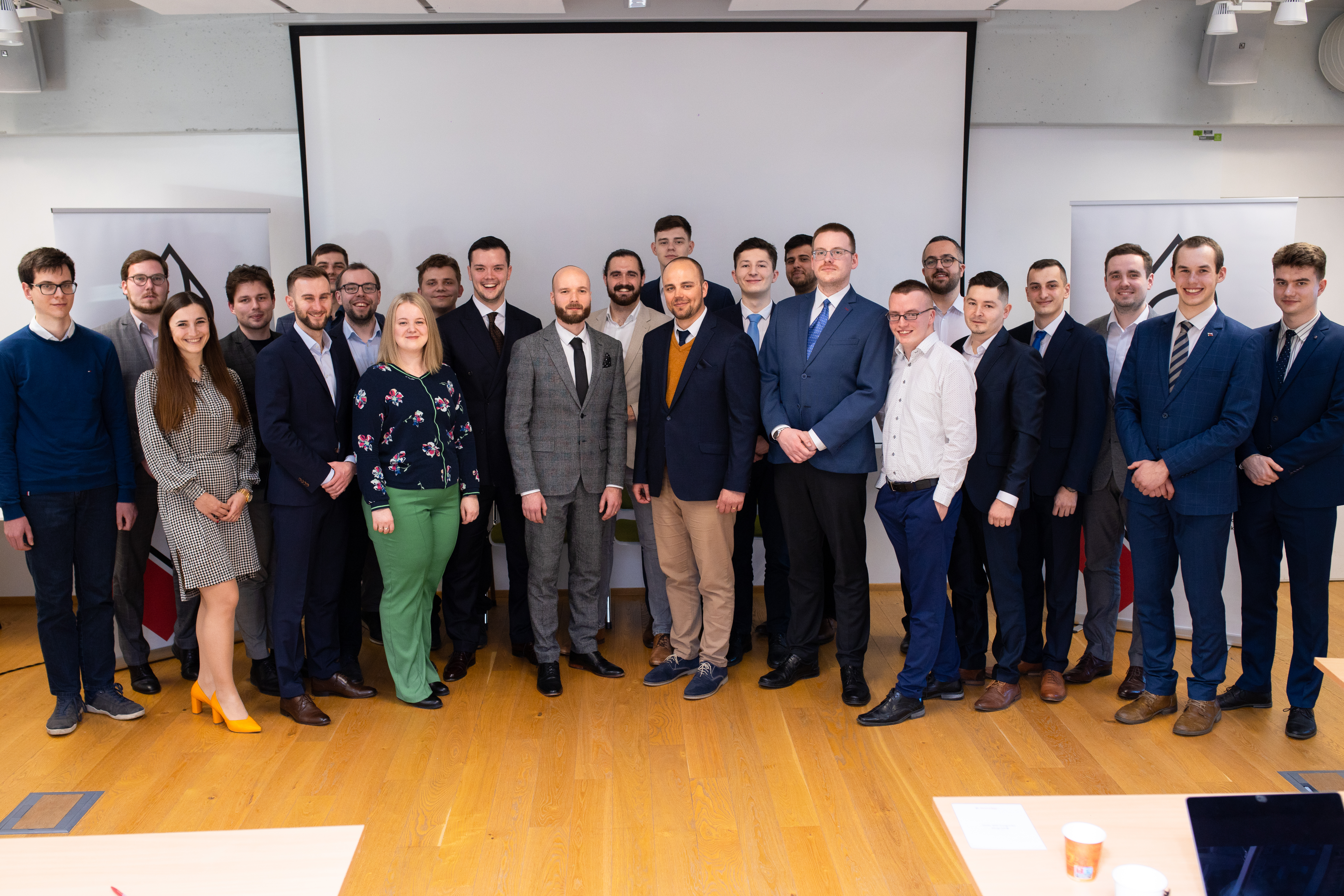
KDMS congress in Bratislava in March 2023.

== History ==
The organisation was founded in 1990 as a Voluntary association cooperating since its outsets with the KDH party. The foundation of Christian democratic organisation was supported by first president of KDH, Ján Čarnogurský. In its beginnings, KDMS began with around 20,000 members of the first post-communist generation, with four regional offices. The partnership with KDH has been not formally approved by the party and the youth organisation until 1993, as members of KDMS cooperated with KDH-split party, Christian Social Union (KSÚ) of Ján Klepáč, as well, while KDH cooperating with other youth organisation, Civic Democratic Youth of Slovakia (ODM), too. In 1990s the members of KDMS have criticised then-ruling HZDS party for its autocratic practices.

In 2008, the organisation suffered from the split in KDH and creation of new political party, Conservative Democrats of Slovakia (KDS), as the then-leadership switched for KDS and only 200 members remained in the KDMS. The organisation flourished back again in 2010s, with ca. 400 members in 2015. In 2018, KDMS has criticised the slow progress of the reconstruction of the university dormitories in Slovakia under SMER-SD-led coalition.

KDMS regularly organizes discussions, seminars and conferences, during the summers the main activity is the climb to the Ďumbier peak in Nízke Tatry mountain range, organised as a week-long programme since 1991. The aim of the organisation is to educate and aid young people with their professional growth as future leaders. Since 2020, KDMS organizes Political Academy of Women to support young women's interest in politics and Communal Academy for perspective communal politicians.

== Ideology ==
KDMS holds socially conservative and Christianity-based positions in socio-cultural issues and assumes a definite attitude against left-wing politics. Its public appearance has been described as the projection of religious content into political discourse. It clearly positions itself as centre right-wing association.

== Chairpersons ==
- Ján Dečo (1990)
- František Stano (1990–1992)
- Michal Sallem (1992–1993)
- Martin Vahančík (1993)
- Peter Stach (1995–1999)
- Jana Tutková (1999–2000)
- Boris Ažaltovič (2000–2002)
- Mária Majdová (2005–2007)
- Martin Krajčovič (2007–2011)
- Branislav Rajčáni (2011–2013)
- Marek Degro (2013–2015)
- Radovan Gondžúr (2015–2016)
- Miroslava Stareková (2016)
- Martin Trúchlik (2016–2020)
- Milan Kabina (2020–2021)
- Matúš Mesároš (2021–2024)
- Adam Bátovský (since 2024)

== International relations ==
Since July 1994, KDMS has been a member of Democrat Youth Community of Europe (European Committee of Youth, DEMYC), after being an associated member since 1991. The KDMS is a member of the Youth of the European People's Party (YEPP), an umbrella organisation of Christian Democratic and conservative youth organisations of Europe. It achieved the full membership in 2015. It is also a member of International Young Democrat Union. KDMS closely cooperates with German think-tanks of CDU and CSU, Konrad Adenauer Foundation and Hanns Seidel Foundation.
