= TOP Team =

TOP Team TOP tým
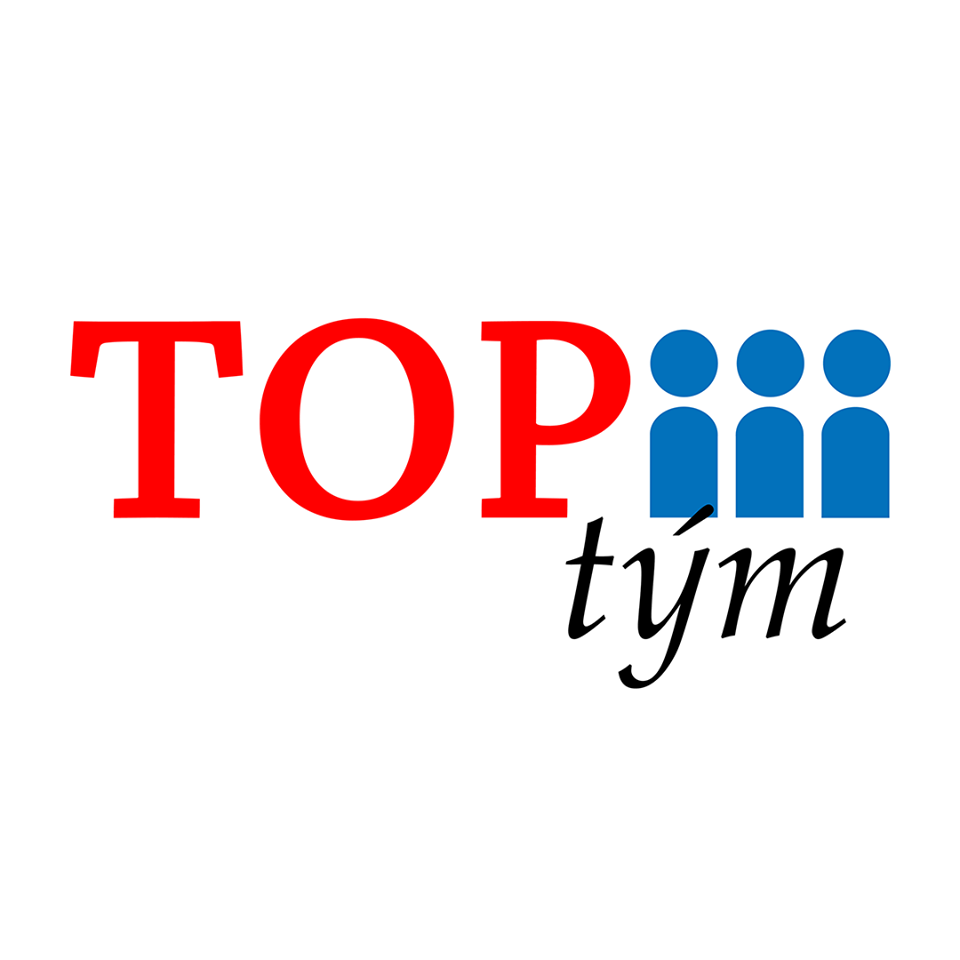
- Chairman: Martin Růžek
- Founded: 2011
- Headquarters: Prague
- Membership: 200 (2024)
- Ideology: Liberal conservatism Pro-Europeanism
- Political position: Centre-right
- National affiliation: TOP 09
- International affiliation: Youth of the European People's Party
- Colours

Website
- toptym.cz

TOP Team is the youth wing of TOP 09. TOP Team has existed since 2011. It was founded as an independent organisation to help TOP 09 during elections. It became party's official organisation in 2017.
