= Sophia Kircher =

Austrian politician (born 1994)

Sophia Kircher MEP
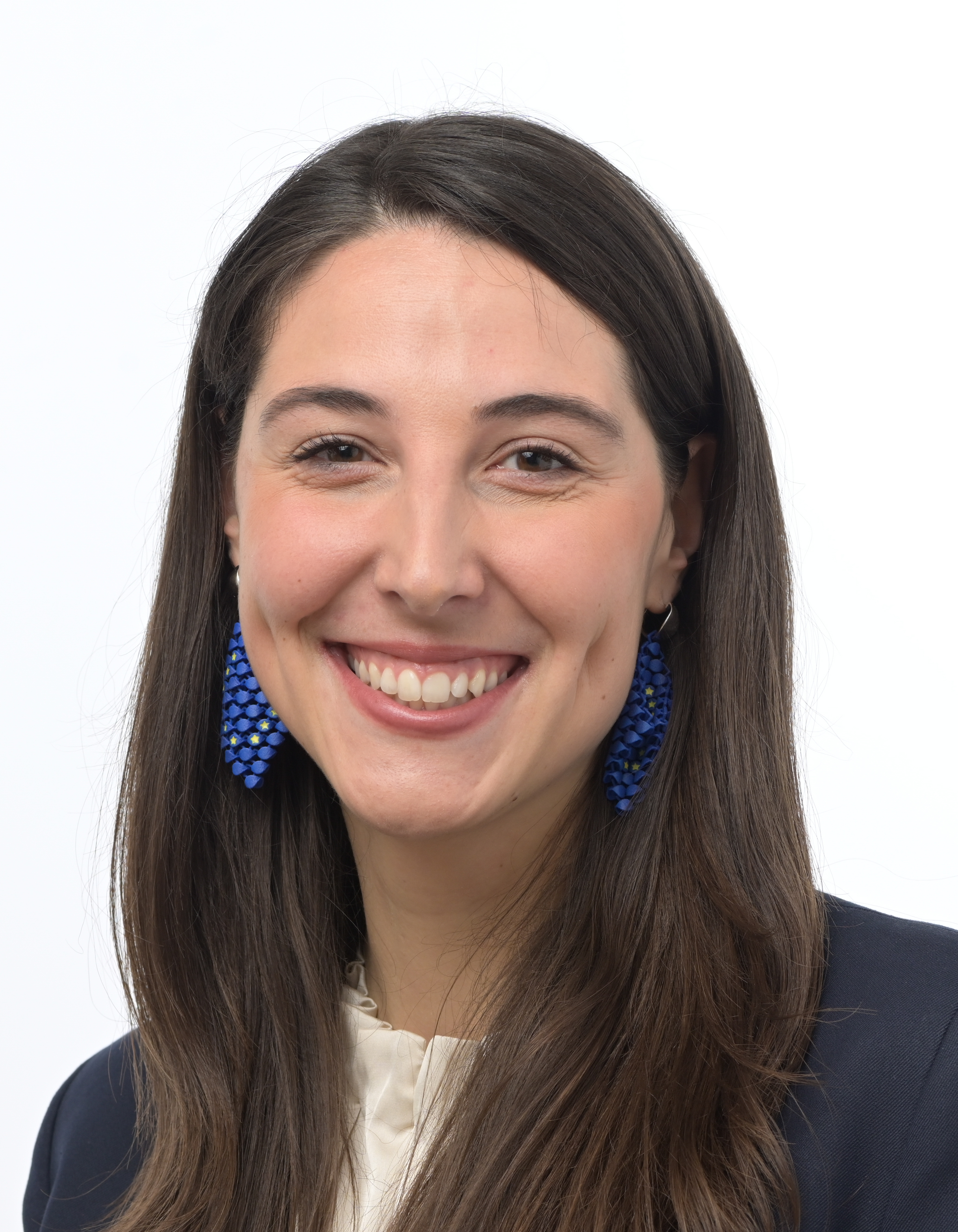
- Official portrait, 2024

President of the Youth of the European People's Party
- Incumbent
- Assumed office 12 July 2025
- Preceded by: Lídia Pereira

Member of the European Parliament for Austria
- Incumbent
- Assumed office 16 July 2024

Member of the Landtag of Tyrol
- In office 28 March 2018 – 15 July 2024

Personal details
- Born: 4 May 1994 (age 31) Innsbruck, Austria
- Party: ÖVP

Sophia Kircher (born 4 May 1994) is an Austrian politician for the ÖVP party. She was elected a member of the European Parliament in July 2024.
