= Konstantinos Kyranakis =

Greek politician (born 1987)

Konstantinos Kyranakis MP
- Κωνσταντίνος Κυρανάκης
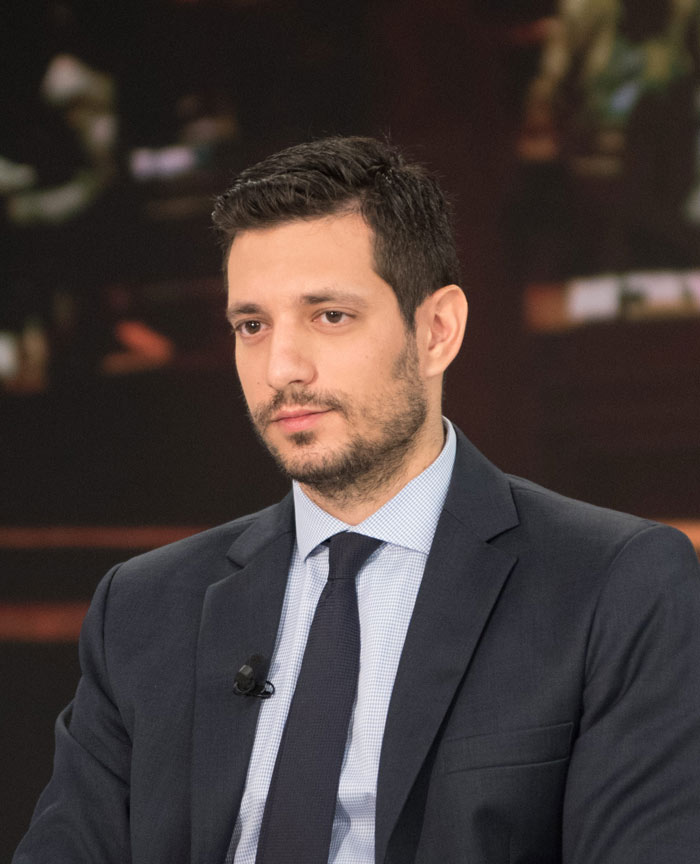
- Kyranakis in 2018

Secretary of New Democracy
- Incumbent
- Assumed office 05 June 2026

Member of the Hellenic Parliament for Athens B3
- Incumbent
- Assumed office 7 July 2019

Ρresident of the Youth of the European People's Party (YEPP)
- In office 2013–2017
- Preceded by: Dömötör Csaba
- Succeeded by: Adriano Ianou

Deputy spokesman for New Democracy
- In office September 2016 – January 2019

Personal details
- Born: 19 April 1987 (age 39) Luxembourg
- Party: New Democracy
- Education: National and Kapodistrian University of Athens; American College of Greece
- Website: kyranakis.gr

Konstantinos Kyranakis (Greek: Κωνσταντίνος Κυρανάκης; born 19 April 1987) is a Greek politician, serving as the General Secretary of New Democracy, and as a Member of the Hellenic Parliament for Athens B3. He is regarded as a member of the right-wing faction within New Democracy, while some of his views are frequently deemed controversial.

== Early life and education ==
Kyranakis was born in Luxembourg and raised in Athens and Brussels. His father is Cretan and mother is from Volos, Thessaly. He has graduated at the European School of Brussels in 2005, holds a bachelor's degree in Law from the University of Athens and a MA in Strategic Communication from the American College of Greece.

Kyranakis worked as a digital strategist from 2008. He was the project manager for a part of the digital campaign of Jean-Claude Juncker for President of the European Commission in 2014. and the head of the digital campaign of Kyriakos Mitsotakis for President of New Democracy in 2015.

He is a member of the International Republican Institute, and has co-founded BrainGain, an initiative aiming at reversing brain drain for Greece. Forbes Magazine nominated and selected Kyranakis in the 30 under 30 list for the year 2016.

== Political career ==
In 2013, Kyranakis was elected president of the Youth of the European People's Party, Europe's largest political youth organisation with over 1 million members from 40 countries and re-elected in 2015.

Kyranakis was a candidate for the European Parliament in 2014 and was appointed deputy spokesman for New Democracy in 2016. From 2016 to 2019, he was also employed by PR agency Blue Skies.

=== Member of the Greek Parliament, 2019–present ===
Kyranakis has been serving as a Member of the Hellenic Parliament for the South of Athens since July 7, 2019, as a member of New Democracy party

== Personal life ==
Kyranakis married Eleni Atherinou on August 22, 2020. Besides Greek, he is fluent in English and French.
