= Stavros Papastavrou =

Greek politician

- Σταύρος Παπασταύρου
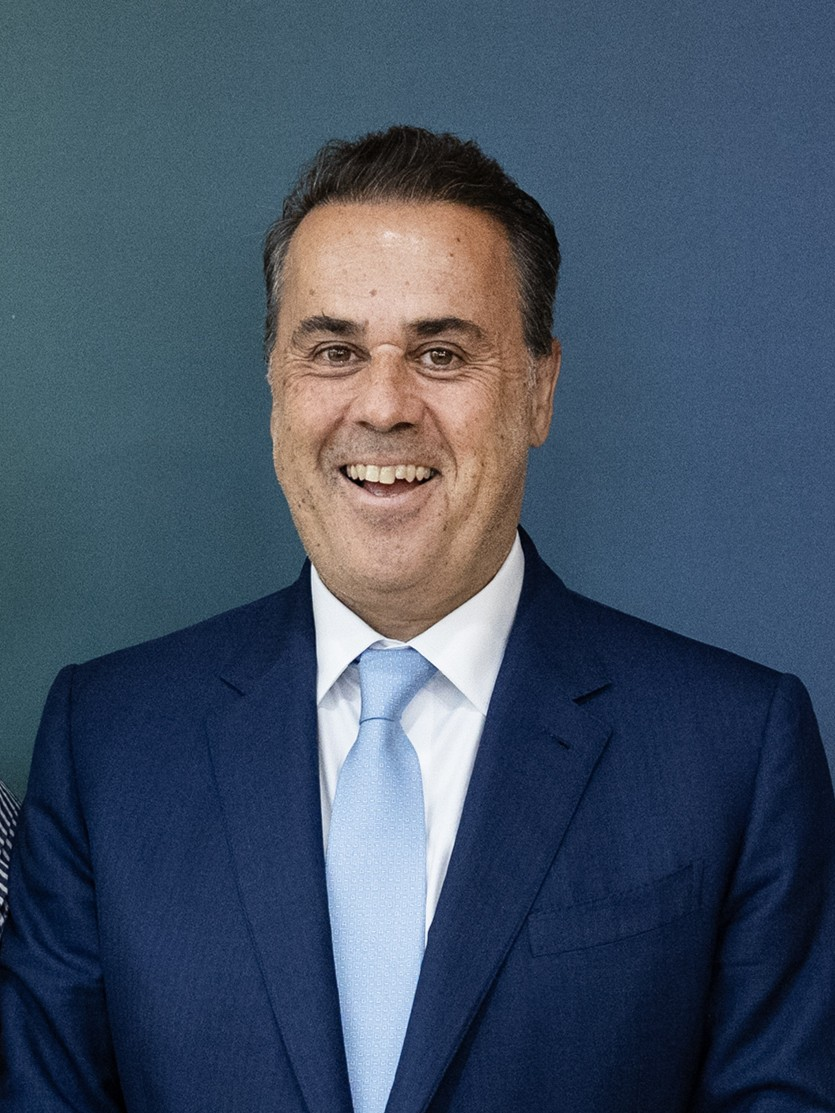
- Papastavrou in 2026

Minister of Environment and Energy
- Incumbent
- Assumed office 14 March 2025
- Preceded by: Theodoros Skylakakis

Chairman of European Democrat Students
- In office 1989–1991
- Preceded by: Bettina Machaczek
- Succeeded by: Laura de Esteban

Chairman of the Democrat Youth Community of Europe
- In office 1997–2001
- Preceded by: Fredrik Reinfeldt
- Succeeded by: Meinhard Friedl

Deputy Chief of Staff for European and International Affairs
- In office June 2012 – January 2015
- Prime Minister: Antonis Samaras

Personal details
- Born: 1967 (age 58–59) Athens, Greece
- Party: New Democracy
- Education: University of Athens; Harvard University

Stavros Papastavrou (Greek: Σταύρος Παπασταύρου; born 1967) is a Greek politician who currently serves as Minister for the Environment and Energy on the second cabinet of Kyriakos Mitsotakis.

== Education ==
He studied law at the University of Athens and graduated in 1990 (valedictorian). He was granted a state scholarship and continued with graduate studies at Harvard University.

== Political career ==
From 1989 to 1991 he was chairman of European Democrat Students, while from 1997 to 2001 Papastavrou was chairperson of the Democrat Youth Community of Europe.

He was a candidate in 1999 Euro-elections with New Democracy but not elected. In 2004 when Nea Demokratia won the national elections in Greece, Prime Minister Kostas Karamanlis appointed him International Secretary of New Democracy, the centre-right party of Greece. At the Euroelections of June 2009 he was again a candidate, this time ranked 9, but his party Nea Demokratia elected only 8.

After the elections of 2009 the new leader of Nea Demokratia Antonis Samaras re-appointed him as International Secretary, a position he held until 2015.

Following the June 2012 election, the newly appointed Prime Minister of Greece, Antonis Samaras, appointed him as his Deputy Chief of Staff for European and International Affairs at the Prime Minister's Office. In August 2012 he was appointed Coordinator of the Greek German Partnership, the bilateral cooperation among the Greek and German state aiming to exchange of technical expertise in various public domains.

In January 2014, Yiannis Stournaras announced that he would be stepping down as Minister of Finance in order to become Governor of the Bank of Greece. It was suggested that Samaras has chosen Papastavrou to replace him as Minister of Finance. However, Gikas Hardouvelis was the one who actually succeedd Stournaras.

Following the win of New Democracy in the June 2023 Greek legislative election, Papastavrou was appointed Minister of State. His mandate included the coordination of the ministries' activities for attracting major investments, the supervision of the Special Secretariat of Foresight, and the supervision of the Coordinating Mechanism for the Rights of People with Disabilities. During his tenure he formulated the National Strategy for the Rights of Persons with Disabilities which was presented in September 2024. He stepped down on 28 March 2024. On 14 March 2025 he was appointed Minister of Environment and Energy.

== Offshore connections ==
When the Lagarde list was published, it was revealed that Papastavrou was the joint holder of an account of $550 million. In response, Papastavrou claimed that it was an attempt by Syriza "to cover him with mud" by accusing him of "political immorality." He also claimed that he had nothing to do with the account in question. The only involvement in the list that he admitted was a $5.4 million account held by one of his clients. Papastavrou was fined €3.5 million for his participation in the SwissLeaks/HSBC affair. This fine was imposed to resolve allegations of tax evasion and money-laundering. In 2021, Papastavrou was cleared of all charges.

The Panama Papers confirmed that Papstavrou had been a member of the council of the Panamanian foundations, Green Shamrock Foundation and Diman Foundation, from 2005 to 2014. In 2006, he became deputy chairman of the Aisios Foundation, that still exists today. However, Papstavrou resigned from the Aisios Foundation in 2012.
