= Young Fine Gael =

Youth wing of Fine Gael

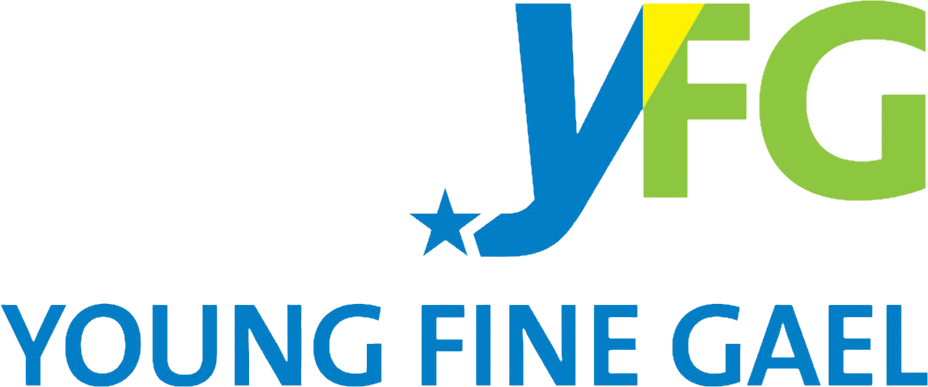
- President: Jamie Malone
- Founded: 1977
- Headquarters: 51 Upper Mount Street, Dublin 2, Ireland
- Ideology: Liberal conservatism Christian democracy Pro-Europeanism
- European affiliation: Youth of the European People's Party
- International affiliation: Youth of the Centrist Democrat International
- Website: www.yfg.ie

Young Fine Gael (YFG) is the autonomous youth wing of Fine Gael, one of Ireland’s major centre-right political parties. It offers its members scope to assist in formulation of political policy, and the day-to-day running of the senior party. It is a founding member of the centre-right pan-European organisation, Youth of the European People's Party, also known as YEPP, which is the youth wing of the European People's Party.

YFG's constitution allows for the organisation to act on its own, independent from its parent party, enabling it to promote its own political objectives and take its own stance on political issues.

== History ==
Young Fine Gael was formed in 1977 as part of the internal reforms to Fine Gael instigated by Garret FitzGerald, who had become leader of the party that same year. They grew rapidly with over 100 local branches of YFG being formed by 1978. During the 1980s the organisation pursued a relatively socially liberal agenda, supporting the repeal of Ireland's homosexuality laws; a ban on the state funding on single-sex schools; and greater family planning options. One of its major early campaigns was to argue for abolish the status of illegitimacy, which was abolished with Status of Children Act 1987 passed by the Fine Gael-Labour government.

Young Fine Gael played an active role in supporting yes votes in a number of referendums on Ireland's participation in the European Union in the 2000s, including the Lisbon Treaty Referendums and the Nice Referendums.

More recently in 2015, YFG campaigned in favour of legalising same-sex marriage by supporting the Thirty-fourth Amendment of the Constitution of Ireland. In 2017, YFG members at the organisation's Summer School voted to take a neutral stance on any upcoming referendum on Ireland's Eighth Amendment governing the country's abortion laws. In 2018, YFG members voted in favour of Ireland becoming a member of the European nuclear physics research centre; CERN.

In 2019, YFG established its first branch in Northern Ireland, with a branch launched at Queen's University Belfast. This launch of this branch was attended by the Attorney General, and Minister for European Affairs Helen McEntee. In 2020, YFG opposed the Programme for Government agreed by Fianna Fáil, Fine Gael and the Green Party in 2020. However, the Fine Gael party voted overwhelmingly in favour of entering coalition.

== Organisation ==
Young Fine Gael is formed from branches, gathered into regional structures, and with an overall National Executive. Officers at all levels work with the Fine Gael National Youth Officer, who works in Fine Gael headquarters.

== Controversies ==
In October 2015, president Padraig O'Sullivan resigned from his position “due to work and personal commitments”. It later transpired that his sudden departure was prompted by other members of the National Executive. An informed source, who declined to be named, told The Journal website that a petition, signed by the majority of executive council members, was hand-delivered to O’Sullivan’s home. The petition demanded that O’Sullivan either resign or he would be forced out. Interim president Colm Taylor, who was elected YFG vice president in March of that year, insisted it was an internal party matter, stating; "The situation is that Padraig did resign. It is an internal party matter. The executive of YFG are meeting on Tuesday to discuss matters arising from it. I won’t comment any further."

In February 2016, a YFG member posted a meme of Sinn Féin's Mary Lou McDonald, making fun of the fact she referred to 'Booby Sands' on a leaflet, online. McDonald described it as an example of "everyday sexism", "tasteless" and "bordering on smutty". Also in 2016, a YFG member replied to a tweet by Sinn Féin councillor Sarah Holland, using the official YFG Twitter account. The reply contained the line 'where's that child I killed?', a reference to the IRA. YFG later apologised for the incident, stating that the tweet had been sent by an individual within the organisation using the YFG account.

In 2018, following the election of YFG president Killian Foley-Walsh, The Journal wrote about a tweet sent by Mr Foley-Walsh in 2015 which argued against the use of abortion pills with reference to "coat hangers," which he later described as "an atrocious comment". This was followed by a profile piece in Phoenix Magazine describing Mr Foley-Walsh as "The baby-faced Blueshirt." In August 2019, there were calls for Foley-Walsh to resign when he and another member of the National Executive, Chloe Kennedy attended the Young America Foundation's annual conference at which many prominent Republicans including the then VP Mike Pence and Ted Cruz spoke. Foley-Walsh also come under fire for his views expressed before being elected — including his apparent victim-blaming of those murdered by right-wing terrorist Anders Breivik, who killed 77 people in Oslo and Utoya in 2011. Neither individual resigned their post arguing it had been a regular event for members of the National Executive to attend.

In November 2021, the Kilkenny branch of YFG publicly called for the resignation of Tánaiste and party leader, Leo Varadkar, due to an ongoing Garda investigation into his leak of a confidential pay agreement document to his friend, a leader of a rival representative group to that involved in the negotiations; and low poll numbers under his leadership. The branch announced the following day that it had been "terminated" and its committee vacated by central Young Fine Gael. The controversy was described as "the straw that broke the camel’s back" by three of the ten-member National Executive, Gary O’Donovan, Dylan Hutchinson, Audrey O’Leary, who resigned in protest at the treatment of the Kilkenny branch, and because of a "toxic" atmosphere within the Executive.
