= Belind Këlliçi =

Albanian politician (born 1987)

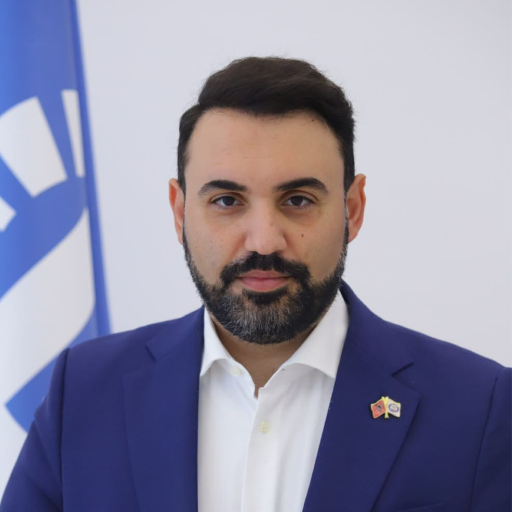

Vice-chairman of the Democratic Party
- Incumbent
- Assumed office 16 July 2026

Vice Chairman of the Parliamentary Group of the Democratic Party
- Incumbent
- Assumed office 11 September 2025

Member of Parliament
- Incumbent
- Assumed office 12 September 2025

Political Leader of the Democratic Party for Tirana County
- Incumbent
- Assumed office 4 September 2024

Member of Parliament
- In office 10 September 2021 – 24 March 2023

1st Secretary for Immigration and Diaspora of the Democratic Party
- In office 30 August 2021 – 11 December 2021
- Preceded by: Office established
- Succeeded by: Indrit Hoxha

Chairman of the Youth of Democratic Party
- In office 7 December 2015 – 1 October 2022
- Preceded by: Gerti Bogdani
- Succeeded by: Besart Xhaferri

Personal details
- Born: 25 January 1987 (age 39) Tirana, Albania
- Party: Democratic Party of Albania
- Relatives: Masar Këlliçi (member of the First Albanian Parliament) and Mytesim Këlliçi (senator of the First Albanian Parliament).
- Education: Coppin State University
- Website: belindkellici.al parlament.belindkellici.al

Belind Këlliçi (born 25 January 1987) is an Albanian politician, Member of Parliament for Tirana County and Vice-Chairman of the Democratic Party and its parliamentary group.

First elected to parliament in the 2021 general elections, he was re-elected in 2025. For the 2025 campaign, the Democratic Party appointed him as its Political Leader for the Tirana County. In 2023, Këlliçi was the official candidate of the Democratic Party for Mayor of Tirana after winning the party's first-ever primary elections.

Këlliçi comes from a well-known traditional Tirana family with a strong political legacy, as he is the grandson of Masar Këlliçi, who represented Tirana and Durrës in the first Albanian Parliament in 1921. He was elected member of the Executive Board of the Democratic Party having most of the votes than any other candidate.

== Early life and education ==
Belind Këlliçi was born in Tirana on 25 January 1987. He began his political career in 2009, after graduating with highest honors from Coppin State University in Baltimore, Maryland, with a degree in Management Science and Economics. He was named "Student with the highest GPA at graduation" and inducted into the Sigma Beta Delta International Honors Society in Business in 2008.

Këlliçi was national tennis champion (under 18) in 2004 and played for Coppin State University’s tennis team from 2005 to 2009 in the MEAC (Mid-Eastern Athletic Conference). In 2007, he was named "Scholar Athlete of the Year" by his university and the MEAC.

== Political career ==
In 2009, Këlliçi returned to Albania, joined the Democratic Party, and participated in its 2009 general election campaign. From 2009 to 2011, he worked at the National Agency of Tourism under the Ministry of Tourism and Culture. During this period, he engaged in various training activities through the Democratic Party Youth Forum (FRPD) and represented Albanian youth internationally.

In the 2011 local elections, Këlliçi joined the campaign of DP candidate Lulzim Basha, who became the Mayor of Tirana. From 2011 to 2015, he worked in the Municipality of Tirana as Head of the City Events Department at the General Directorate of Art & Culture.

In 2014, DP Chairman Lulzim Basha appointed Këlliçi and 21 others as National Coordinators. From 2014 to 2015, he was elected by the DP National Council to head the Department for Former Persecuted People and Land Owners, becoming a member of the party's executive board.

In November 2015, he resigned from his DP positions to run for chairman of the Forumi Rinor i Partisë Demokratike (Democratic Party Youth Forum) (FRPD). On 6 December 2015, he was elected in a "one member, one vote" race that featured 20 debates in 20 cities and over 11,000 participating members.

=== Youth of the Democratic Party ===
After his election in 2015, Këlliçi overhauled FRPD structures, organizing internal elections for all 55 branches and forming new national governing bodies.

During Këlliçi’s leadership, FRPD organized multiple protests against Edi Rama's government, including demonstrations over the killing of Klodian Rasha and government expenditures.

On 17 July 2021, at the DP National Convention, Këlliçi announced it would be his final speech as FRPD chairman.

In November 2021, Lulzim Basha announced new FRPD elections, which angered members who supported Sali Berisha. FRPD members opposed Basha’s order and delayed elections until October 2022. Këlliçi left the chairmanship on 4 October 2022 after Besart Xhaferri was elected.

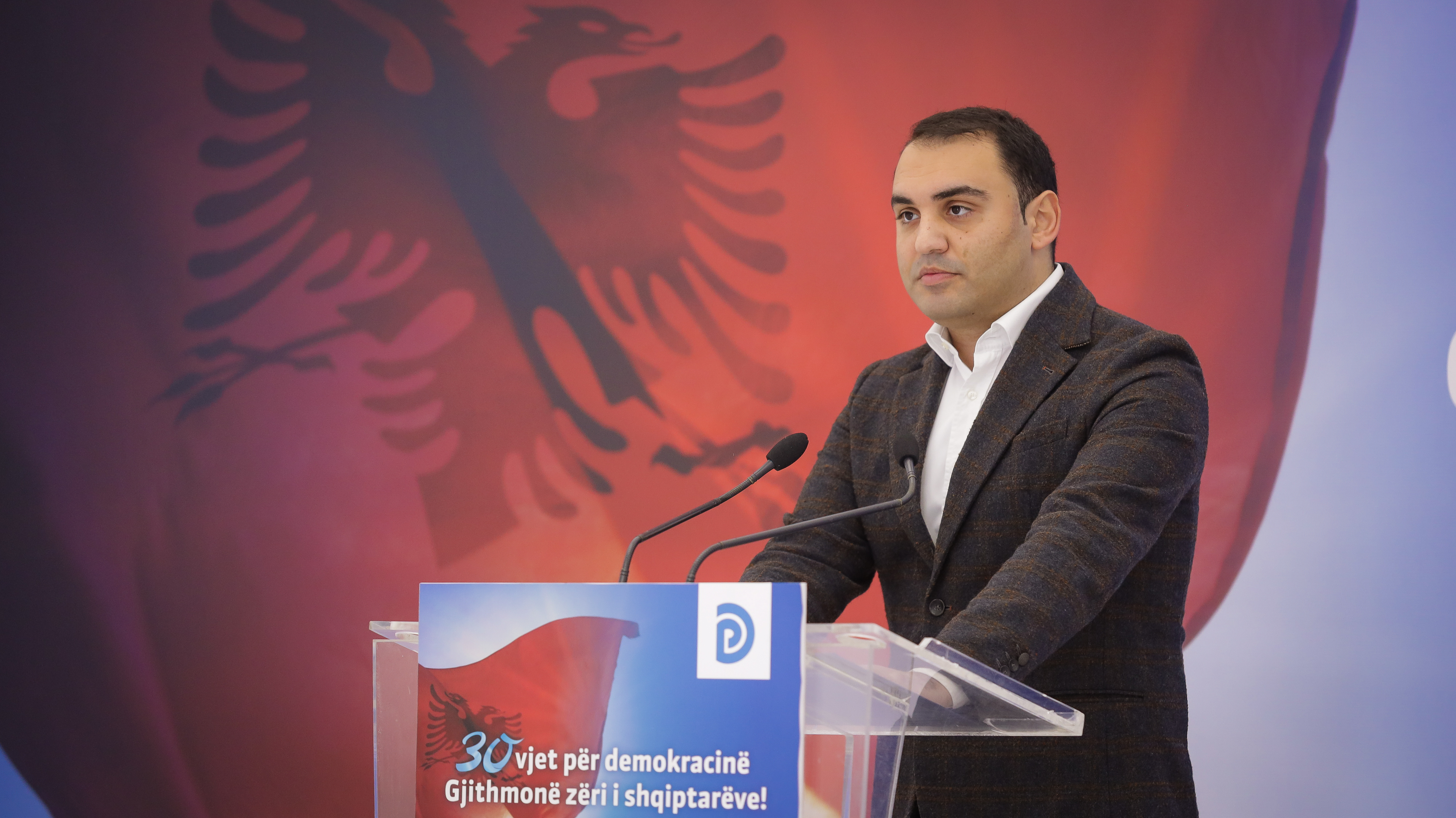
Belind Këlliçi holding a press conference

=== 2021 parliamentary elections ===
In February 2021, DP leader Lulzim Basha appointed Këlliçi as political leader for parts of Tirana County. In March, he was listed 10th in DP's Tirana County list.

During the campaign, he was fined ALL 5 million for violating COVID-19 rules but the fine was later overturned by the Administrative Court.

In the 25 April elections, he was elected MP with 11,601 votes, ranking third in Tirana for the Democratic Party and 12th nationwide. He was elected 100 years after his great-grandfather entered Parliament.

=== Member of Parliament ===
Këlliçi took office on 10 September 2021. He was appointed to the temporary Commission verifying parliamentary mandates.

He served on the inquiry committee on incinerators and gained attention after a lengthy debate with Prime Minister Edi Rama.

=== Steering Interim Commission of the Democratic Party ===
On 11 December 2021, the DP National Assembly, led by delegates, removed Lulzim Basha as chairman. Këlliçi led the assembly and was appointed to the party's Steering Interim Commission.

On 30 April 2022, he again led the National Assembly. After the commission's term ended, he was the top vote-getter in elections to the party's Executive Board.

=== 2023 Tirana Mayoral Election ===
In 2023, Këlliçi was the official candidate of the "Together We Win" (Bashkë Fitojmë) coalition for the Mayor of Tirana in the local elections held on May 14. He won the Democratic Party's first-ever primary elections to become the candidate. During the campaign, after candidate Ilir Alimehmeti withdrew from the race, Këlliçi announced that Alimehmeti would serve as his deputy mayor if elected.

A central theme of his campaign was the denunciation of alleged corruption within the municipality, specifically what became known as the "5D file." Këlliçi publicly accused directors appointed by Mayor Erion Veliaj of secretly owning a private company, "5D Konstruksion," which had allegedly won millions of euros in public tenders from the municipality. Nearly a year after Këlliçi's public denunciations, the Special Anti-Corruption Structure (SPAK) arrested several directors of the Tirana municipality, including key figures Mariglen Qato and Redi Molla, in connection with the case.

The election resulted in a victory for the incumbent mayor, Erion Veliaj of the Socialist Party. Veliaj secured a third term with 158,688 votes (54.69%), while Këlliçi received 100,351 votes (34.58%). Following the election, Këlliçi and the opposition alleged that the results were distorted by electoral manipulation.

=== Meeting with Donald Trump ===
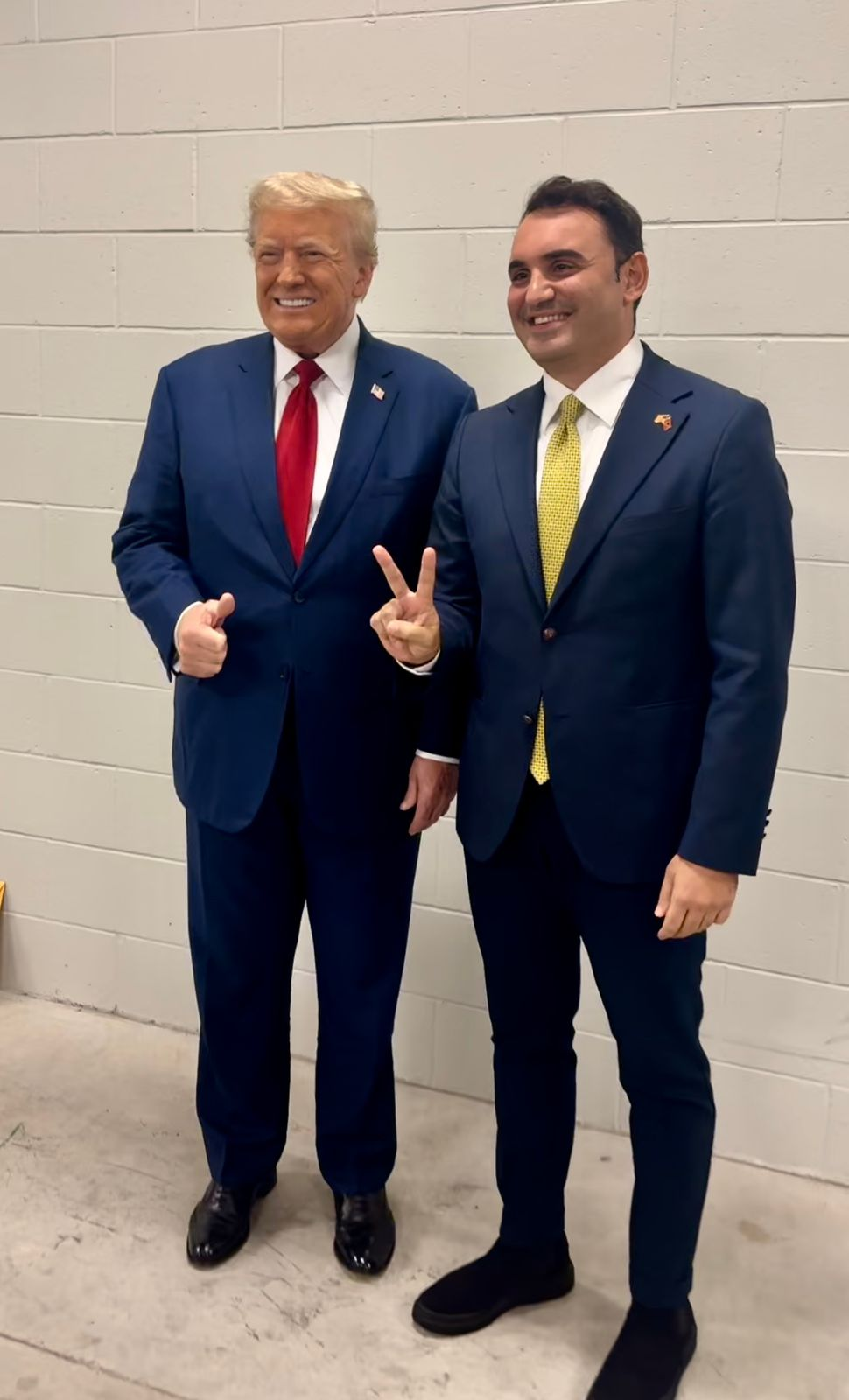

In October 2024, Këlliçi met with President Donald Trump during a campaign event in Saginaw, Michigan. The meeting, and a photograph Këlliçi posted from it, generated considerable controversy in Albania. Këlliçi stated the meeting was at no cost, though this was publicly questioned by political activists and led to him being questioned by Albania's Special Anti-Corruption Structure (SPAK) regarding the financing of the trip. As of now, there is no actual proof that Belind Këlliçi used money to settle this meeting. The meeting was criticized by the ruling Socialist Party and government-controlled media. Këlliçi remains the only known member of the Albanian parliamentary opposition to have met with Donald Trump.

=== 2025 Parliamentary Elections in Albania ===
As a prominent figure in the Democratic Party, Belind Këlliçi played a central role in the 2025 parliamentary election campaign, particularly in the Tirana county. Throughout the campaign, he was one of the opposition's most active voices in denouncing what he termed "electoral crimes" and the misuse of state resources by the ruling Socialist Party.

A notable incident occurred during election day, when Këlliçi led a group of opposition representatives to expose an alleged illegal Socialist Party office operating near a voting center in Tirana. He claimed the office was being used for illicit activities, including voter profiling and the distribution of aid in exchange for votes, and filed a report with SPAK.

Earlier, in February 2025, Këlliçi had publicly accused Klotilda Bushka, a Socialist MP and head of the Law Committee, of being involved in the destruction of evidence related to the "5D file" case against former Tirana Mayor Erion Veliaj. Citing what he claimed was the official SPAK file, he alleged that Bushka had destroyed a phone containing incriminating evidence.

Following the election on May 11, 2025, Këlliçi was re-elected as a Member of Parliament for the Tirana County.
