= Barna Tánczos =

Romanian politician (born 1976)

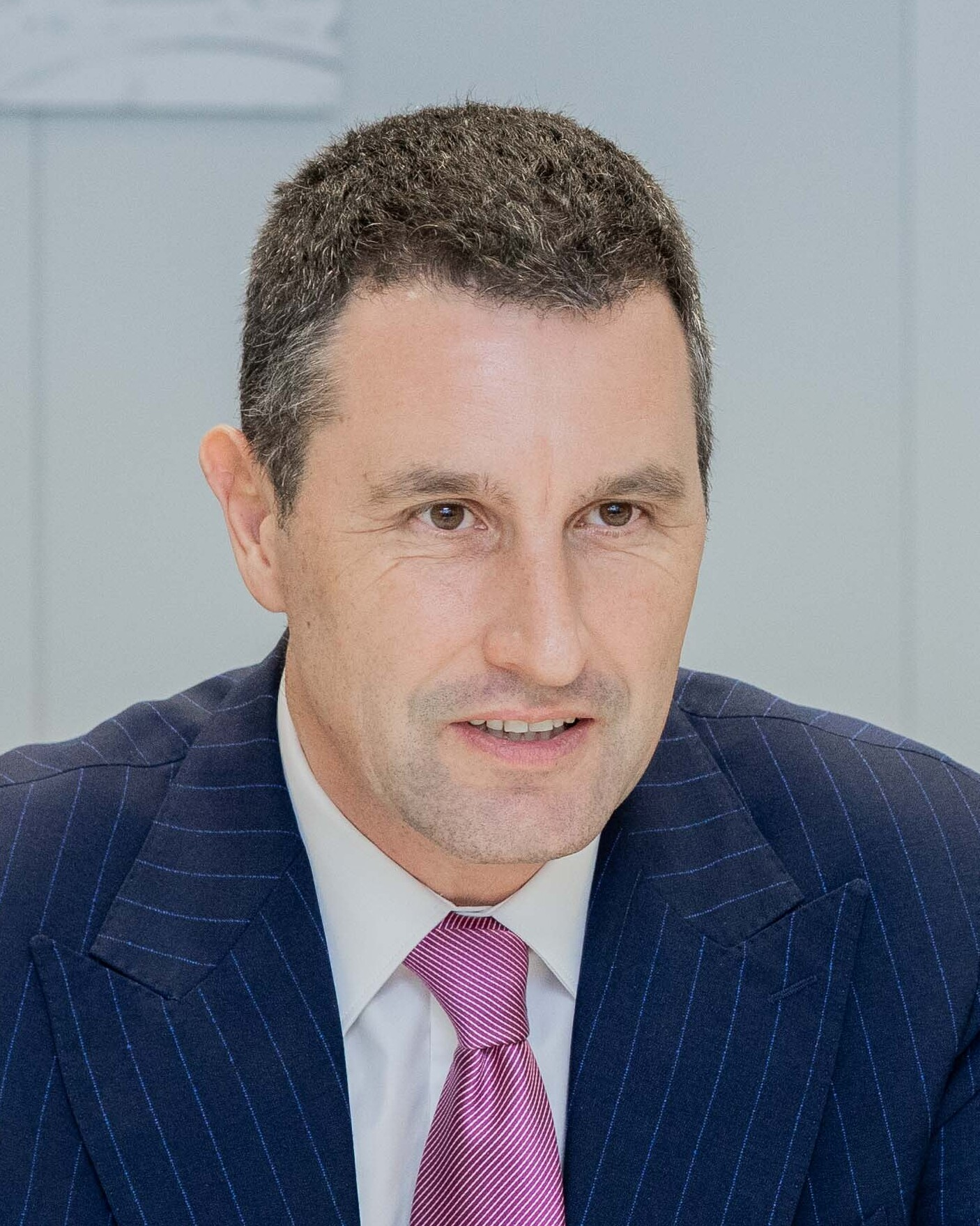
- Tánczos in 2025

Deputy Prime Minister of Romania
- Incumbent
- Assumed office 23 December 2024
- Prime Minister: Marcel Ciolacu; Cătălin Predoiu (acting); Ilie Bolojan

Minister of Finance
- In office 23 December 2024 – 23 June 2025
- Prime Minister: Marcel Ciolacu; Cătălin Predoiu (acting)
- Preceded by: Marcel Boloș
- Succeeded by: Alexandru Nazare

Minister of Environment, Water and Forests
- In office 23 December 2020 – 15 June 2023
- Prime Minister: Florin Cîțu; Nicolae Ciucă
- Preceded by: Mircea Fechet
- Succeeded by: Mircea Fechet

Senator of Romania
- Incumbent
- Assumed office 19 December 2012
- Constituency: Harghita County

Personal details
- Born: 25 May 1976 (age 50) Miercurea Ciuc, Harghita County, Romania
- Party: Democratic Alliance of Hungarians in Romania (UDMR/RMDSZ)
- Spouse: Szidonia Tanczos
- Children: 2

Barna Tánczos (Note: Romanian pronunciation: [ˈbarna ˈtant͡soʃ]; Hungarian pronunciation: [ˈbɒrnɒ ˈtaːnt͡soʃ]) (born 25 May 1976) is a Romanian politician who has been serving as Minister of Environment, Water and Forests in the Cîțu Cabinet and Ciucă Cabinet from 23 December 2020 until 15 June 2023.

== Notes ==
Political offices
Preceded by Mircea Fechet	Minister of Environment, Water and Forests; 2020–present	Incumbent
