= Maria Syrengela =

Greek politician (born 1975)

Member of the Hellenic Parliament
- Incumbent
- Assumed office 21 May 2023
- Constituency: Athens B2

Personal details
- Born: 25 December 1975 (age 50)
- Party: New Democracy

Maria Syrengela (Greek: Μαρία Συρεγγέλα; born 25 December 1975) is a Greek politician serving as a member of the Hellenic Parliament since 2023. She concurrently serves as secretary of New Democracy since 2023, and as a member of the Parliamentary Assembly of the Council of Europe since 2023.
