= Mircea Fechet =

Romanian politician (born 1980)

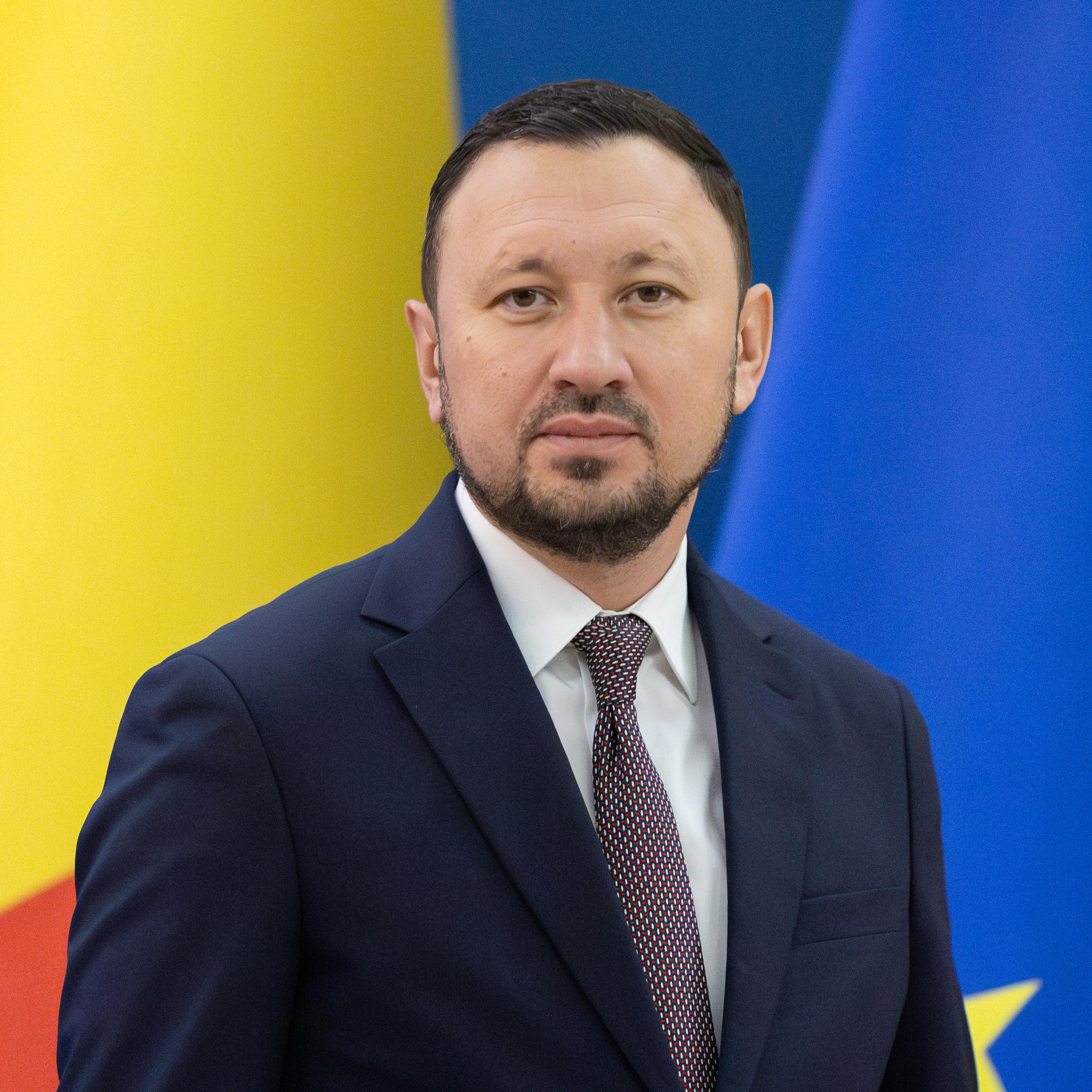

Minister of Environment, Water and Forests
- In office 15 June 2023 – 23 June 2025
- Preceded by: Barna Tánczos
- Succeeded by: Diana Buzoianu
- In office 5 November 2020 – 23 December 2020
- Preceded by: Costel Alexe
- Succeeded by: Barna Tánczos

Personal details
- Born: 1 July 1980 (age 45)

Mircea Fechet (born 1 July 1980) is a Romanian politician. He served as Minister for Environment, Waters and Forests from 5 November 2020 to 23 December 2020. Barna Tánczos was appointed as his successor.

He was elected to the Chamber of Deputies in December 2020.

Political offices
Preceded by Costel Alexe	Minister of Environment, Water and Forests; 2020–2020	Succeeded by Barna Tánczos
