= Gerti Bogdani =

Albanian politician (1980–2024)

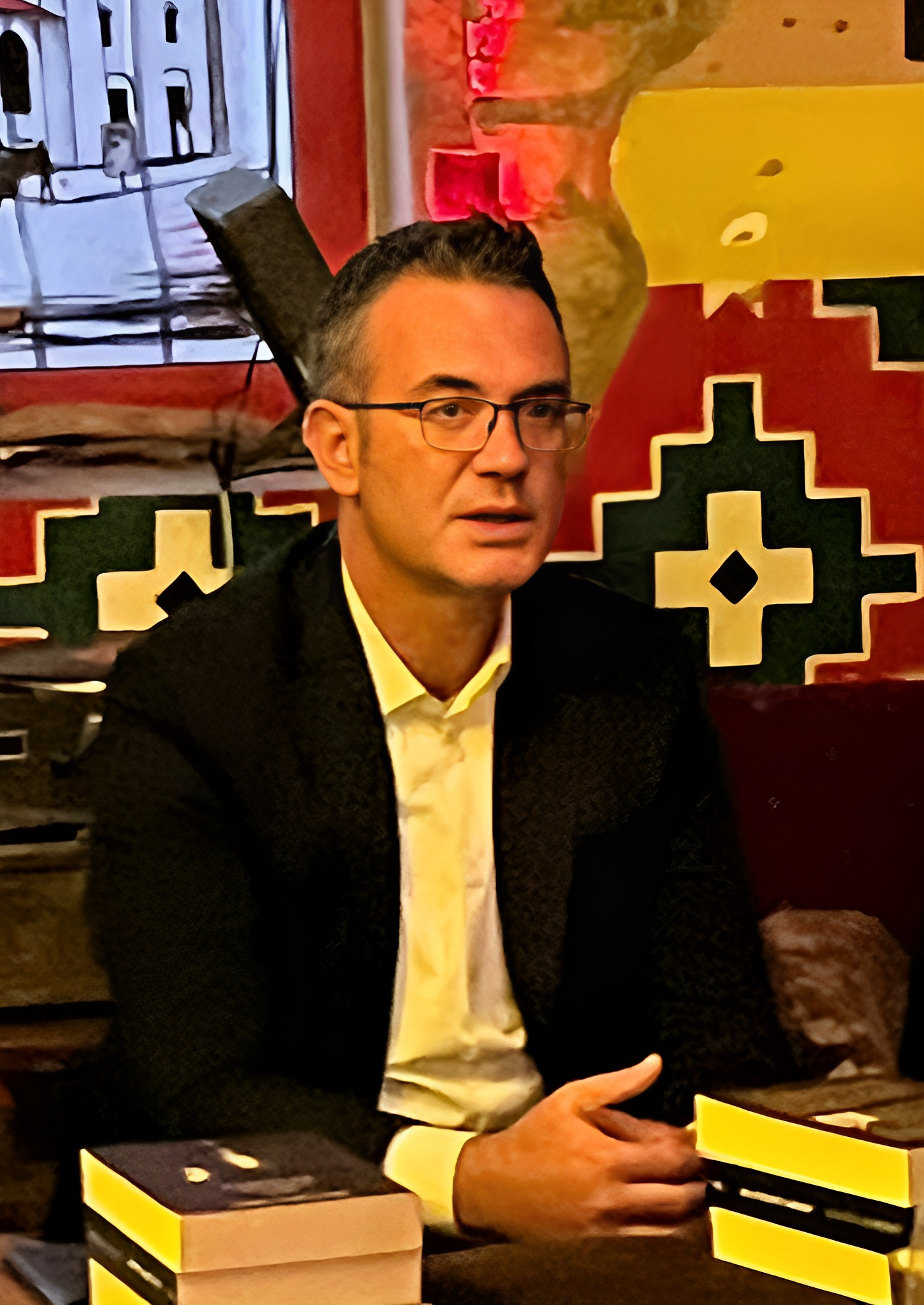
- Bogdani in 2023

Member of the Albanian Parliament
- In office 2009–2017

International Secretary, DP
- In office 2007–2024
- Preceded by: Besnik Mustafaj

Chairman of FRPD - The Youth Forum of the Democratic Party
- In office 2009–2015
- Preceded by: Sokol Olldashi
- Succeeded by: Belind Këlliçi

Personal details
- Born: Gerti Jusuf Bogdani; 7 July 1980 Tirana, Albania
- Died: 18 September 2024 (aged 44) Tirana, Albania
- Party: Democratic Party
- Spouse: Edlira Çepani
- Children: 2
- Education: New York University Tandon School of Engineering
- Occupation: politician
- Committees: EU Integration Committee, Foreign Affairs Committee, Education and Public Means Committee, and Albania Stabilization and Association Parliamentary Committee

Gerti Jusuf Bogdani (7 July 1980 – 18 September 2024) was an Albanian politician of the Democratic Party of Albania, and one of Albania's youngest-ever mayors at the time of his election. He was also the chairman of the International Young Democrat Union (IYDU).

== Background ==
Bogdani was born in Tirana, Albania on 7 July 1980. He attended Harry Fultz High School. After graduation, he studied on full scholarship at the New York University Tandon School of Engineering. He graduated summa cum laude with a bachelor of science degree in computer science and was the recipient of the university's Outstanding Graduate Award. Bogdani then returned to Albania where he started his professional career in academia as a full-time professor of computer science at the University of New York in Tirana.

Bogdani was a founding member of the Albanian Students Abroad Network (AS@N), which supports Albanian students studying abroad through partnerships with the Ministry of Culture, Ministry of Education, Youth and Sports, Ministry of Foreign Affairs, Public Administration Department, international organizations, the Albanian diaspora, and the local and international donor community.

Bogdani died from a cardiac arrest in Tirana, on 18 September 2024, at the age of 44.

== Political career ==
Bogdani became one of the youngest mayors in Albanian history in 2007, when he was elected as the mayor of Borough No. 10 in Tirana. During his time as mayor, he led a team of 38 people to deliver and sustain services to a constituency of close to 30,000 residents.

During his tenure, Borough No. 10 became the first local government area in Albania to finalize the civil registry digitalization process and introduce electronic certificates. It was also the first local government area to introduce a contemporary address and road sign system, which served as a successful model that was later scaled up in the capital and other cities.

From April 2007 until September 2021, Bogdani served as the international secretary and member of the presidency of the Democratic Party of Albania. In this role, he managed and strengthened relations with the International Democrat Union (IDU) and the European People's Party (EPP) and advised on initiatives in partnership with sister parties around the world. He was highly involved in the Democratic Party of Albania's application process for full membership in the IDU and its later accession as member with voting rights in the EPP.

From March 2009 until December 2015, Bogdani served as the chairman of the Youth Organization of the Democratic Party of Albania. As the head of the organization, Bogdani directed operations, planning procedures, and internal election standards and processes. He also led the organization's programming to support political education, training, and leadership capacity-building, and oversaw the establishment of political academies.

From September 2009 until September 2017, Bogdani served as a member of the Albanian parliament. During his tenure, he was a member and the secretary of the EU Integration Committee, as well as a member of the Foreign Affairs Committee, Education and Public Means Committee, and Albania Stabilization and Association Parliamentary Committee.

From March 2012 to January 2016, Bogdani was the vice chairman and then chairman of the International Young Democrat Union (IYDU), where he was responsible for programming, managing, organizing, and hosting international events, developing projects and initiatives geared toward empowering youth and young women leaders around the world, and supporting electoral integrity and freedom campaigns.

== Other ==
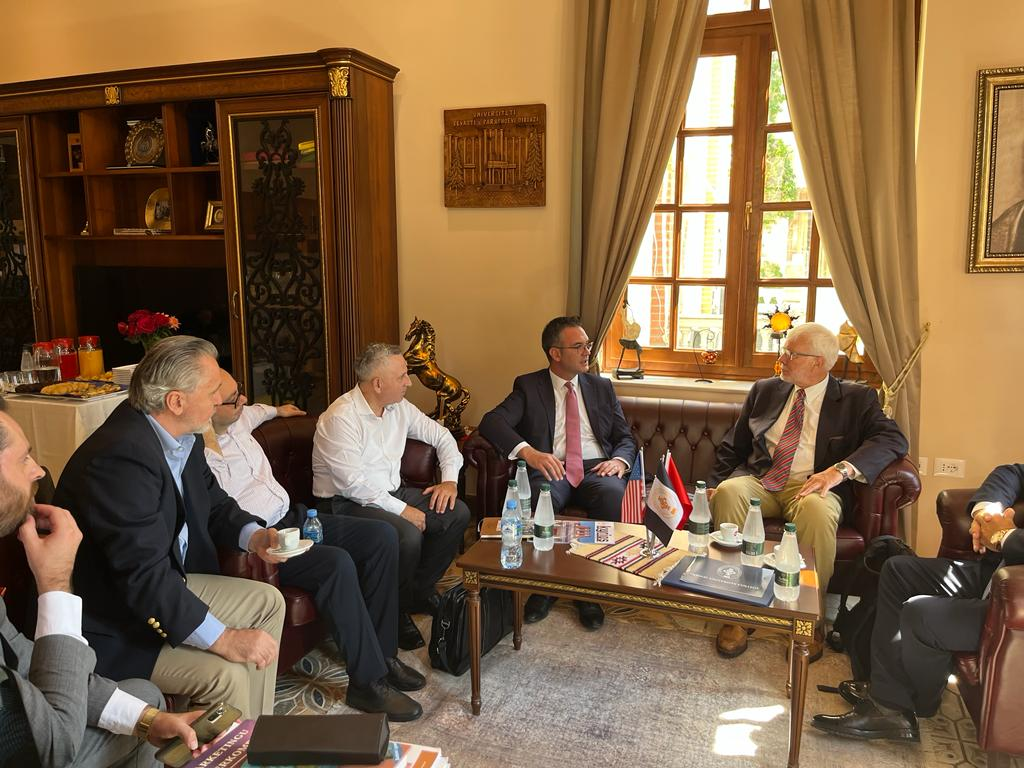
Gerti Bogdani and Rolf Mowatt-Larssen discussing interreligious dialogue, faith, and service at Qirjazi University College in Albania.

A devout Christian, Bogdani was a longtime promoter of Christian values and supporter of Christian causes in Albania. He advocated publicly for interreligious dialogue between Albania's Christian and Muslim faith communities, as well as across the Western Balkans and internationally.

In 2023, Bogdani organized the publication of the Albanian-language edition of former CIA officer Rolf Mowatt-Larssen's memoirs, A State of Mind: Faith and the CIA, which explore the intersection of religious faith and service. He also wrote the prologue to the edition.
