= Sidonia Jędrzejewska =

Polish politician (born 1975)

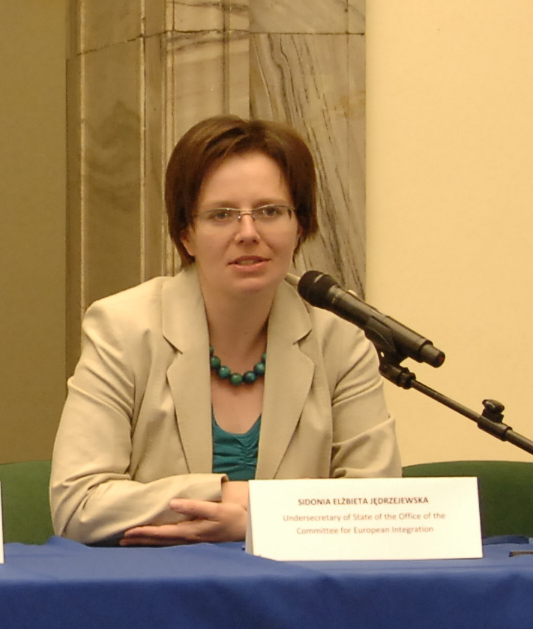

Sidonia Elżbieta Jędrzejewska (born 5 November 1975 in Kraków) is a Polish politician and MEP. She was the Undersecretary of State in the Office of the Committee for European Integration in Poland (2008–2009).

Sidonia Jędrzejewska graduated from the Adam Mickiewicz University in Poznań with a degree in sociology. From 1999 to 2003 she was a PhD student of the Institute of Philosophy and Sociology of the Polish Academy of Sciences. Among others, she has held scholarships from MENiS, the German Academic Exchange Service and the Stefan Batory Foundation.

In the mid-1990s, she cooperated with the Association of Young Democrats in Poland, the Youth of the European People's Party and the European Youth Forum. From 1999 to 2003 she was the Vice-President of the Youth of the European People's Party and from 2000 to 2002 she was the Vice-President of the European Youth Forum in Brussels.

She worked as an administrator in the Secretariat of the European Parliament's Committee on Budgets and a research assistant at the University of Central Europe in Warsaw. In 2006, she became an advisor on the EU budget to the European People's Party – European Democrats Group in the European Parliament (EPP-ED), negotiating the Multiannual Financial Framework for the years 2007–2013.

From January 2008 until June 2009, she was the Undersecretary of State in the Office of the Committee for European Integration in Poland.

From 2001 she is a member of the Polish centre-right party Civic Platform (PO). She was elected Member of the European Parliament in 2009 where she joined the EPP Group. She is a member of the Committee on Budgets and the Delegation for relations with Switzerland and Norway and to the EU-Iceland Joint Parliamentary Committee and the European Economic Area (EEA) Joint Parliamentary Committee. She is a subsite member of the Committee on Budgetary Control (CONT), the Committee on Employment and Social Affairs (EMPL), the Delegation to the EU-Mexico Joint Parliamentary Committee (D-MX) and the Delegation to the Euronest Parliamentary Assembly (DEPA).

In 2010 and 2011 Sidonia Jędrzejewska was the EP's general rapporteur for EU Budget 2011. Since 2012 she has been the EPP vicecoordinator in the Committee on Budgets.

In 2010 Sidonia Jędrzejewska was nominated by the renowned Brussels magazine "The Parliament Magazine" for the MEP Award for the economic and monetary affairs. The same year, "Polityka" weekly honoured her with the title – "Best debut" in the European Parliament. In 2013 in another ranking realized by "Polityka" she was chosen by Polish journalists as "Best Polish MEP".

== Sources ==
- Sidonia Jędrzejewska – Link to the European Parliament website
- Sidonia Jędrzejewska – Homepage
