= Forumi Rinor i Partisë Demokratike =

Albanian political party youth wing

Youth forum of the Democratic Party of Albania Forumi Rinor i Partise Demokratike
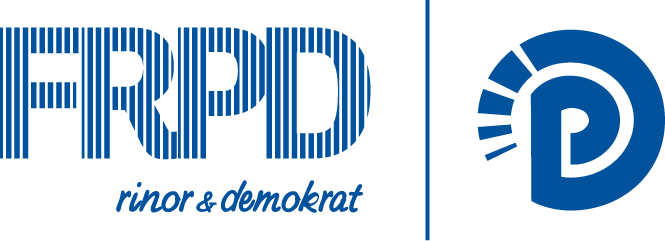
- Chairperson: Besart Xhaferi
- Founded: 1991
- Headquarters: Tirana
- Ideology: Conservatism, Liberal conservatism
- Mother party: Democratic Party of Albania
- International affiliation: European Democrat Students; Youth of the European People's Party
- Website: www.frpd.al

The Youth Forum of the Democratic Party of Albania (Albanian: Forumi Rinor i Partise Demokratike, abbreviated as FRPD) is the youth wing of the Democratic Party of Albania. Founded in 1991 following the collapse of the communist regime, FRPD in recent times has grown to become one of the largest youth political organisations in the Western Balkans, with major contributions and influence within the Democratic Party. FRPD is one of the founders of the Youth of European People's Party (YEPP) in 1997, and in 2020, following years of negotiations, managed to become full members of European Democrat Students.

In October 2022, Besart Xhaferri was elected chairman of FRPD for the Berisha wing of the Democratic Party.

== History of FRPD ==
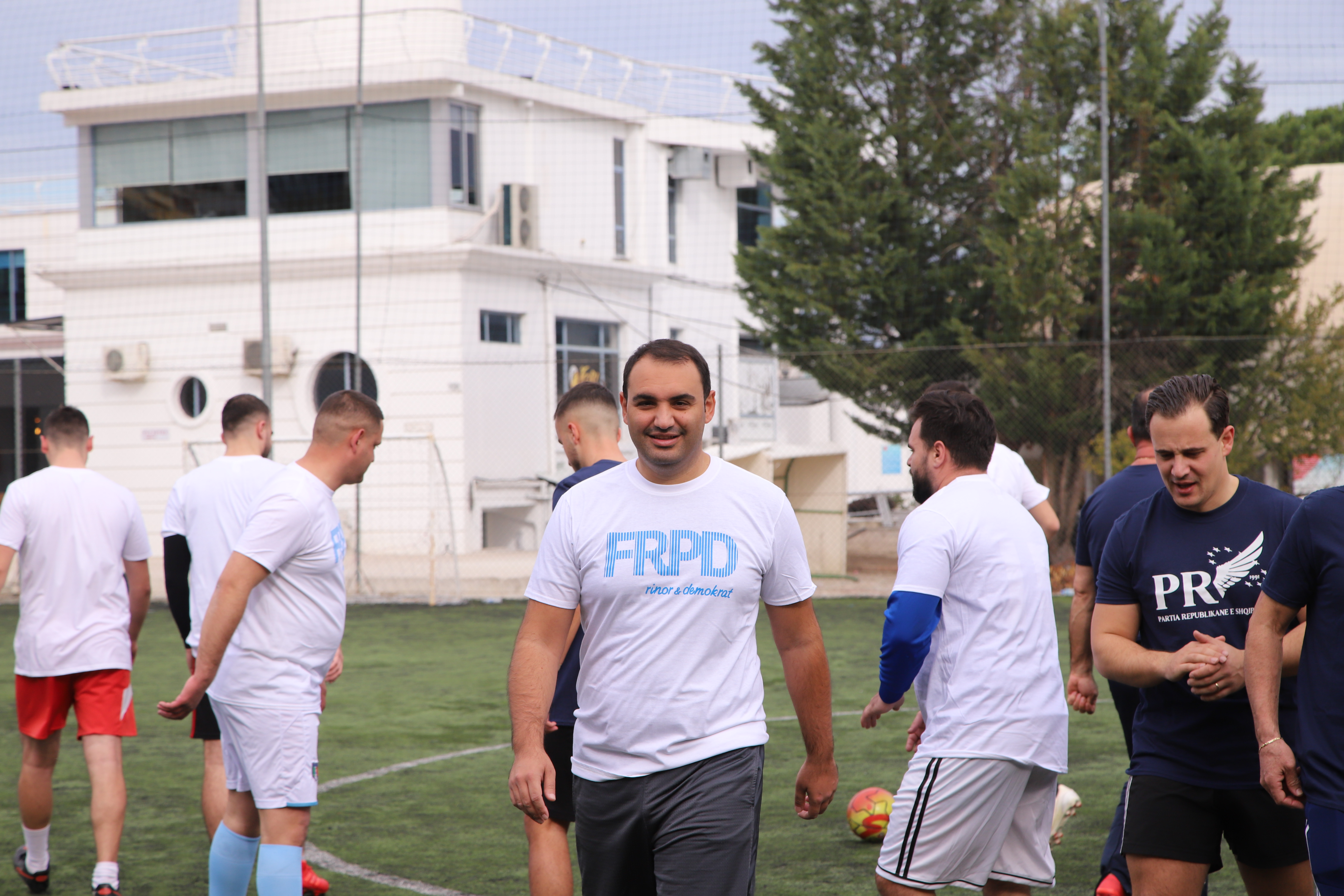
FRPD leader at the time Belind Këlliçi at a football match against the Republican Party Youth Forum in 2020

FRPD, created in the fall of 1991 by founding students of the Democratic Party and active participants in the student movement of December '90, FRPD was considered the first youth political organization created in the scene of Albanian pluralism, which it had included in its membership young democrats from the age 16 to 35 years old. Originally the Democratic Party was a party that had a catch all movement of Liberals and Conservatives. However, much of the liberal wing of the Democratic party of Albania would join Neritan Ceka to create the Democratic Alliance party. The FRPD since 2013 continues to protest against the ruling party of Albania. Such as calling for the Removal of Edi Rama.

== Chairs of FRPD ==
Chairs of FRPD during years
Name	Term
Ridvan Peshkëpia	1991–1992
Arben Lika	1992–1993
Afrim Krasniqi	1994–1998
Gent Strazimiri	1998–2000
Kolin Gjoka	2000–2002
Sokol Olldashi	2002–2009
Gerti Bogdani	2009–2015
Belind Këlliçi	2015 - 2022
Besart Xhaferi	2022–Present
