= Democrat Youth Community of Europe =

Democrat Youth Community of Europe (DEMYC)
- Formation: 1964
- Type: Christian democracy, Conservatism
- President: Javier Hurtado Mira
- Secretary General: Margherita Saltini
- Key people: Falah Hasan
- Affiliations: International Young Democrat Union

The Democrat Youth Community of Europe (DEMYC) is the international umbrella organisation of the youth wings of Christian democratic, conservative and like-minded parties of Europe. With currently now more than one million affiliates in its member organisations, DEMYC is one of the strongest political youth organisations in Europe.

DEMYC is the oldest centre-right youth political formation in Europe, founded in 1964, celebrating 51 years of existence. DEMYC currently comprises 45 national organisations from 33 countries from Europe and its neighbourhood.

It is DEMYC's aim to further contacts and strengthen co-operation between its member organisations from European countries and thereby to contribute to a united Europe.

In 1973 DEMYC was granted a consultative status at the Council of Europe and since then represented its member organisations in the activities of the European Youth Centres and the European Youth Foundation.

DEMYC is a full member of the European Youth Forum, a platform of one hundred youth organisations all over Europe, promoting the interest of young people to the institutions of the European Union, the Council of Europe, and the United Nations.

The senior parties of the DEMYC member organisations followed their youth organisation's example and formed in 1978 the European Democrat Union (E.D.U.), a European-wide working association of centre-right parties. DEMYC became a permanent observer of EDU in 1979 and has been actively involved in its political work since then.

Each year DEMYC organises a number of seminars in different parts of Europe. Topics discussed at these meetings in recent years have included: the new democracies in Central and Eastern Europe and their way into a common future Europe, the European Union and its development to a unified Europe, the North-South dialogue, environmental and employment policy, the future of the welfare state, implications of the introduction of new technologies and a lot more.

At the international level, DEMYC has supported the establishment of the International Young Democrat Union (IYDU), establishing links with centre and centre-right political parties worldwide. It has also developed relations with the Republican Party of the United States and organisations with similar political orientations in Latin America, Africa and Asia.

Study visits have been made to the United States, Central America, Cyprus, Israel, Southern Africa, China, Hong Kong, Turkey and to all former communist countries in Central and Eastern Europe before and after their democratisation.

The organisation was founded as the Conservative and Christian Democratic Youth Community of Europe (COCDYC) in May 1964 by the conservative and Christian democratic youth organisations from Austria, Denmark, Germany, Serbia, Hungary, Luxembourg, Norway, Sweden and the United Kingdom. The current name was adopted at the conference in Manchester in October 1975, to allow for a broader ideological spectrum.

== List of Chairpersons ==
Name	Years	Country
John MacGregor	1964–1966	United Kingdom
Dietrich Rollmann	1966–1968	Germany
Ragnvald Dahl	1968–1970	Norway
Alan Haselhurst	1970–1972	United Kingdom
Volker Rühe	1972–1974	Germany
Per Unckel	1974–1977	Sweden
Tony Kerpel	1977–1979	United Kingdom
Elmar Brok	1979–1981	Germany
Gunnar Hökmark	1981–1983	Sweden
Robert Miller-Bakewell	1983–1985	United Kingdom
Alexander Demblin	1985–1987	Austria
Neale Stevenson	1987–1991	United Kingdom
Klaus Welle	1991–1994	Germany
Arthur Winkler-Hermaden	1994–1995	Austria
Fredrik Reinfeldt	1995–1997	Sweden
Stavros Papastavrou	1997–2001	Greece
Meinhard Friedl	2001–2006	Austria
Ines Elise Prainsack	2006–2008	Austria
Páll Heimisson	2008–2010	Iceland
Jani Johansson	2010–2012	Finland
Antonio de Lucia	2012–2015	Italy
Javier Hurtado Mira	2015–	Spain

== Executive Bureau 2018–20 ==
The new DEMYC Executive Bureau was elected in May 2018 by the 26th DEMYC Congress.

Name	Country	Position
Javier Hurtado Mira	Spain	Chairman
Margherita Saltini	Italy	Secretary General
Lilit Beglaryan	Armenia	Deputy Secretary Gerenal
Falah Hasan	Kurdistan	First Vice Chairman
Juela Hamati	Albania	Vice Chairman
Athanasios Lazaros Moldovanidis	Greece	Vice Chairman
Andrej Čuš MP	Slovenia	Vice Chairman
Marko Dejanovic	Serbia	Vice Chairman

== See also ==
- Youth of the European People's Party (YEPP)
- European Young Conservatives
