= International Young Democrat Union =

Global association of centre-right political youth groups

- Abbreviation: IYDU
- Formation: March 1991; 35 years ago
- Type: Political international
- Purpose: World federation of conservative youth organizations
- Region served: Worldwide
- Official language: English
- Chair: Eva Dohalova
- Secretary General: Orestis Trasanidis
- Parent organisation: International Democracy Union
- Website: http://iydu.org/

The International Young Democrat Union (IYDU) is a global alliance of center-right political youth organizations and the youth wing of the International Democracy Union.

The IYDU in its current form was founded in March 1991 in Washington, D.C. A previous organization of the same name had been established in July 1981, also in Washington, but subsequently ceased to exist.

The IYDU fights for conservative and free-market policies worldwide.

IYDU host a number of events for member organisations each year including a Freedom Forum (mid-year), an annual Council Meeting, and overseas study visits.

Following almost 6 years of the IYDU being split over differences in the interpretation of the IYDU constitution, the International Young Democrat Union Joint Council Meeting elected an unified IYDU Board in Brussels on 21 October 2017.

== Principles ==
Per the IYDU, it was first established in 1981 and "is a global alliance of center-right political youth organizations united by a common desire for greater freedom and less government. "It claims that members have become cabinet ministers, members of parliament, senior advisers and leaders within their respective industries in public and private sectors."

== Parent organisation ==
The parent organization to IYDU, the International Democracy Union (IDU), is a working association of 71 full and associate members from 63 different countries. Formed in 1983, founder members included Britain's Prime Minister Margaret Thatcher; US Vice-President George H. W. Bush; Mayor of Paris, and later French President, Jacques Chirac; and German Chancellor Helmut Kohl.

== Chairmen ==
| Name | Years | Organization | Country |
|---|---|---|---|
| Mark Heywood | 1992–1994 | Young Liberals | Australia |
| Tony Zagotta | 1994–1998 | College Republicans | United States of America |
| Andrew Rosindell | 1998–2002 | Young Conservatives | United Kingdom |
| Shane Frith | 2002–2004 | Young Nationals | New Zealand |
| Donald Simpson | 2004–2006 | Conservative Future Scotland | United Kingdom |
| Peter Skovholt Gitmark | 2006–2008 | Young Conservatives | Norway |
| Tim Dier | 2008–2010 | Conservative Future | United Kingdom |
| Daniel Walther | 2010–2012 | Junge Union | Germany |
| Nicolas Figari | 2012–2012 | New Generations Independent Democratic Union | Chile |
| Aris Kalafatis | 2012–2014 | Youth Organisation of New Democracy | Greece |
| Gerti Bogdani | 2014–2016 | Youth of Democratic Party of Albania | Albania |
| Simon Breheny | 2016–2017 | Young Liberals | Australia |
| Bashir Wardini | 2016–2018 | Lebanese Forces Youth Association | Lebanon |
| Abdelmajid Fassi Fihri | 2018–2019 | Youth Istiqlal Party | Morocco |
| Bruno Kazuhiro | 2019–2021 | Juventude Democratas | Brazil |
| Michael Dust | 2021–2025 | Junge Union | Germany |
| Eva Dohalova | 2025- | Austrian People's Party | Austria |

== Board 2025 ==
- Chair:

Austria // Eva Dohalova

- Deputy Chair:

Nepal // Hikmat Jung Karki

- Secretary General:

Greece // Orestis Trasanidis

- Deputy Secretary General:

United States // Andrea Catsimatidis

- Treasurer:

Australia // Angus Webber

- Vice Chairs:

Belgium // Thomas Belligh

Morocco // Marwa El Ansari

St. Vincent and the Grenadines // Nick Francis

France // Théophile de Muizon

Ukraine // Dinara Habibullaieva

Ghana // Isaac Jay Hyde

Brazil // Daniel Kennedy

Italy // Roberto Pellizzaro

United Kingdom // Harriet Cross MP

Finland // Jere Tuononen

Germany // Charlotte Warken-Luxenburger

== Members ==
Current IYDU members are (as of August 3, 2025):

- Africa // Young Democrat Union of Africa
- Albania // Youth Forum of the Democratic Party of Albania
- Anguilla // One Anguilla Youth
- Argentina // Young PRO
- Armenia // Young Republicans of Armenia
- Australia // Australian Liberal Students Federation; Young Liberals; Young Nationals
- Austria // Young People's Party
- Azerbaijan // Azerbaijan National Independence Party Youth
- Belgium // Jong CD&V, Jong N-VA
- Belize // United Democratic Party Youth (Youth Popular Front)
- Bolivia // Juventud Demócratas
- Bosnia and Herzegovina // Mladež Hrvatska Demokratska Zajednica Bosne i Hercegovine; Youth Association of SDA
- Brazil // Young Republicans
- Bulgaria // Youth Union of Democratic Forces; MGERB
- Caribbean // Caribbean Young Democrat Union
- Chile // National Renewal Youth; New Generations of Independent Democratic Union
- Colombia // New Generations of Conservative Party
- Costa Rica // Youth of National Integration Party
- Cyprus // Protoporia; Youth of the Democratic Rally
- Czech Republic // TOP Tym; Mladi Konzervativci; Mladi Lidovci
- Denmark // Konservativ Ungdom; Konservativ Studentere
- Dominica // Young Freedom Movement
- Ecuador // Juventud 6 PSC
- El Salvador // ARENA Youth
- Estonia // ResPublica
- Europe // Youth of the European People's Party; European Young Conservatives; European Democrat Students; Nordic Young Conservative Union; Nordic Conservative Student Union; Democratic Youth Community of Europe
- Finland // Kokoomusnuoret; KD Nuoret
- France // Les Jeunes Républicains (LJR)
- Georgia // United National Movement (UNM)
- Germany // Junge Union; Junge Union Bayern; Ring Christlich-Demokratischer Studenten
- Ghana // Youth League of the New Patriotic Party
- Greece // ONNED Greece; DAP-NDFK Greece
- Grenada // New National Party Youth
- Guatemala // Juventud Unionista
- Honduras // Juventud Nacionalista
- Hungary // Fidelitas; Young Christian Democratic Union
- India // Bharatiya Janata Yuva Morcha
- Kurdistan Region // Chaldo Assyrian; KYC Kurdish Youth Congress (Kurdistan Region)
- Israel // Likud Youth
- Italy // Forza Italia Giovani; National Youth; Junge Generation der Südtiroler Volkspartei
- Jamaica // Young Jamaica — Generation 2000
- Kenya // Youth of Democratic Party; KANU Youth Congress
- Lebanon // Lebanese Forces Students Association
- Liberia // Unity Party National Youth Congress
- Lithuania // TS-LKD Jaunimo Bendruomene
- Maldives // MDP Youth
- Moldova // PAS Youth
- Mongolia // Democratic Youth of Mongolia
- Morocco // Istiqlal Youth
- Mozambique // RENAMO Youth League
- Namibia // PDM Youth League
- Nepal // National Democratic Youth Organization
- Netherlands // CDJA
- New Zealand // Young Nationals
- North Macedonia // VMRO-DPMNE Youth Force Union
- Norway // Young Conservatives; Hoyers Studenterforbund
- Paraguay // Jovenes Colorados
- Poland // Mlodzi Demokraci
- Portugal // People's Youth; Juventude Social Democrata
- Romania // Tineretul National Liberal
- San Marino // Giovani Democratico Cristiani
- Slovakia // Christian Democratic Youth of Slovakia; Občiansko Demokratická Mládež
- Slovenia // Slovenska Democratska Mladina; Nova Generacija SLS
- Spain // New Generations of the People's Party
- Sri Lanka // National Youth Front
- St. Kitts and Nevis // People’s Action Movement Youth
- St. Lucia // United Youth
- St. Vincent and Grenadines // Young Democrats
- Sweden // Moderate Youth League; Young Christian Democrats; Fria Moderata Studentforbundet
- Switzerland // Young Swiss People's Party
- Taiwan // Kuomintang Youth League
- Tanzania // Chadema Youth
- Uganda // Forum for Democratic Change Youth
- Ukraine // Solidarna Molod
- United Kingdom // Young Conservatives
- United States // Young Republicans; College Republican National Committee
- Venezuela // Primero Justicia; Proyecto Venezuela
