= Costel Alexe =

Romanian politician (born 1983)

Minister for Environment, Waters and Forests
- In office 4 November 2019 – 5 November 2020
- Prime Minister: Ludovic Orban
- Preceded by: Grațiela-Leocadia Gavrilescu
- Succeeded by: Mircea Fechet

Personal details
- Born: 20 August 1983 (age 42)
- Party: National Liberal Party

Costel Alexe (born 20 August 1983) is a Romanian politician. He served as Minister for Environment, Waters and Forests in the cabinets of Prime Minister Ludovic Orban. He resigned after being elected president of the Iaşi County Council and was succeeded by Mircea Fechet.

In 2021, he became the subject of a criminal investigation by National Anticorruption Directorate on allegations including bribery and incitement to embezzlement. As of 2026, the case is still ongoing in court, with hearings continuing and no final ruling reported.

Political offices
Preceded by Grațiela-Leocadia Gavrilescu	Minister for Environment, Waters and Forests; 2019–2020	Succeeded by Mircea Fechet
