= Ecotourism =

Touring natural habitats while minimizing environmental impact

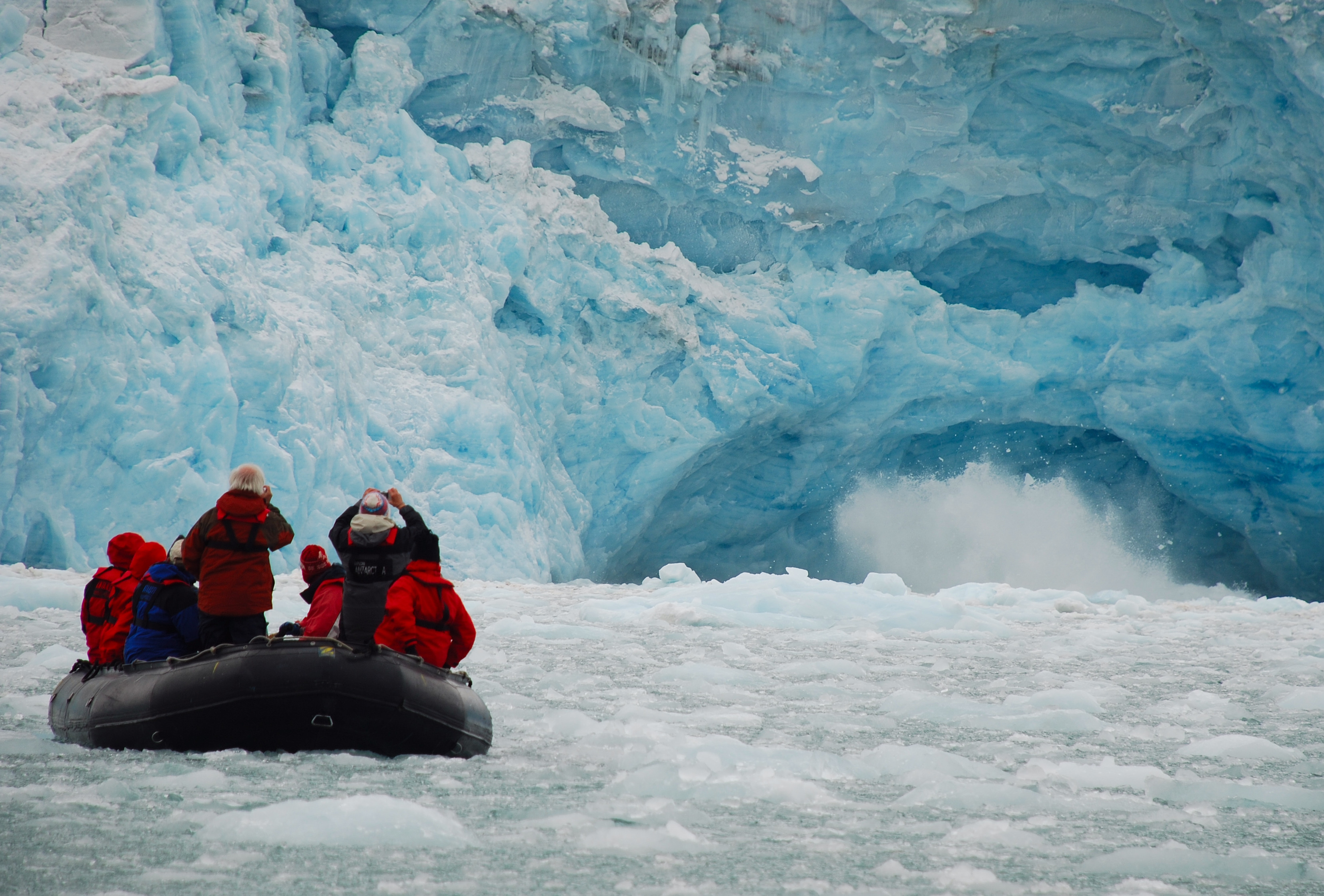
Ecotourism in Svalbard.

Ecotourism is a form of nature-oriented tourism intended to contribute to the conservation of the natural environment, generally defined as being minimally impactful, and contributing to both conservation and environmental education. The definition sometimes also includes being financially beneficial to the host community or making conservation financially possible. There is a range of different definitions, and the correct definition of the term was an active subject of debate as of 2009. The term is also used more widely by many organizations offering nature tourism, which do not focus on being beneficial to the environment.

Since the 1980s, ecotourism has been considered an important endeavor by environmentalists for conservation reasons. Organizations focusing on ecotourism often make direct or indirect contributions to conservation or employ practices or technology that reduce impacts on the environment. However (according to Buckley), very few organizations make a net-positive impact on the environment overall. Ecotourism has also been criticized for often using the same infrastructure and practices of regular tourism under a different name. Like most long-distance travel, ecotourism often depends on air transportation, which contributes to climate change.

Generally, ecotourism deals with interaction with living parts of natural environments, in contrast to geotourism, which is associated with geology. In contrast to nature tourism and sustainable tourism in general, ecotourism is also usually intended to foster a greater appreciation in tourists of natural habitats and threats they experience, as well as local culture. Responsible ecotourism programs include those that minimize the negative aspects of conventional tourism on the environment and enhance the cultural integrity of local people. Therefore, in addition to evaluating environmental and cultural factors, an integral part of ecotourism is the promotion of recycling, energy efficiency, water conservation, and the creation of economic opportunities for local communities.

== Risks and benefits ==
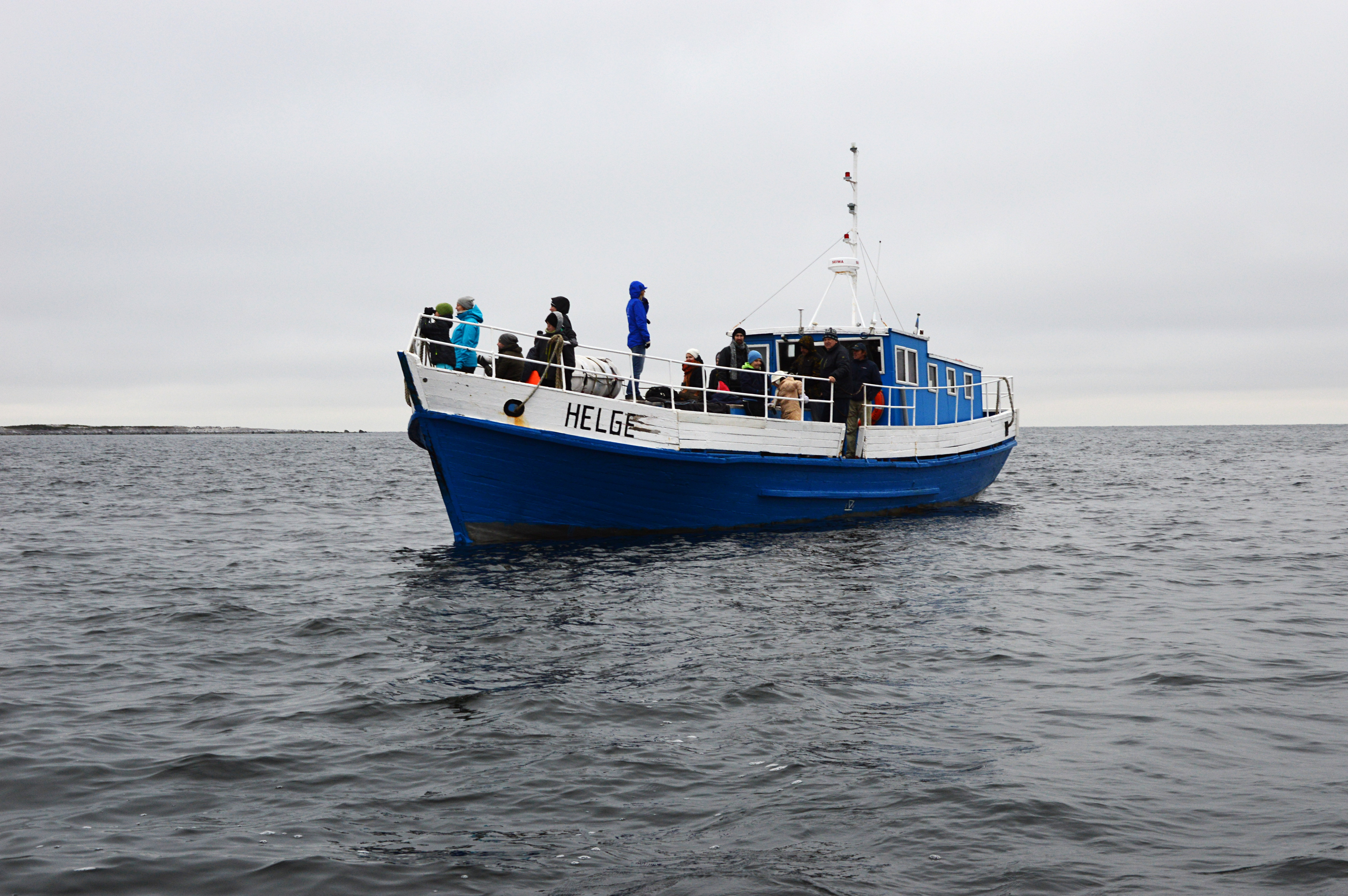
Seal watching near Malusi Islands in Estonia

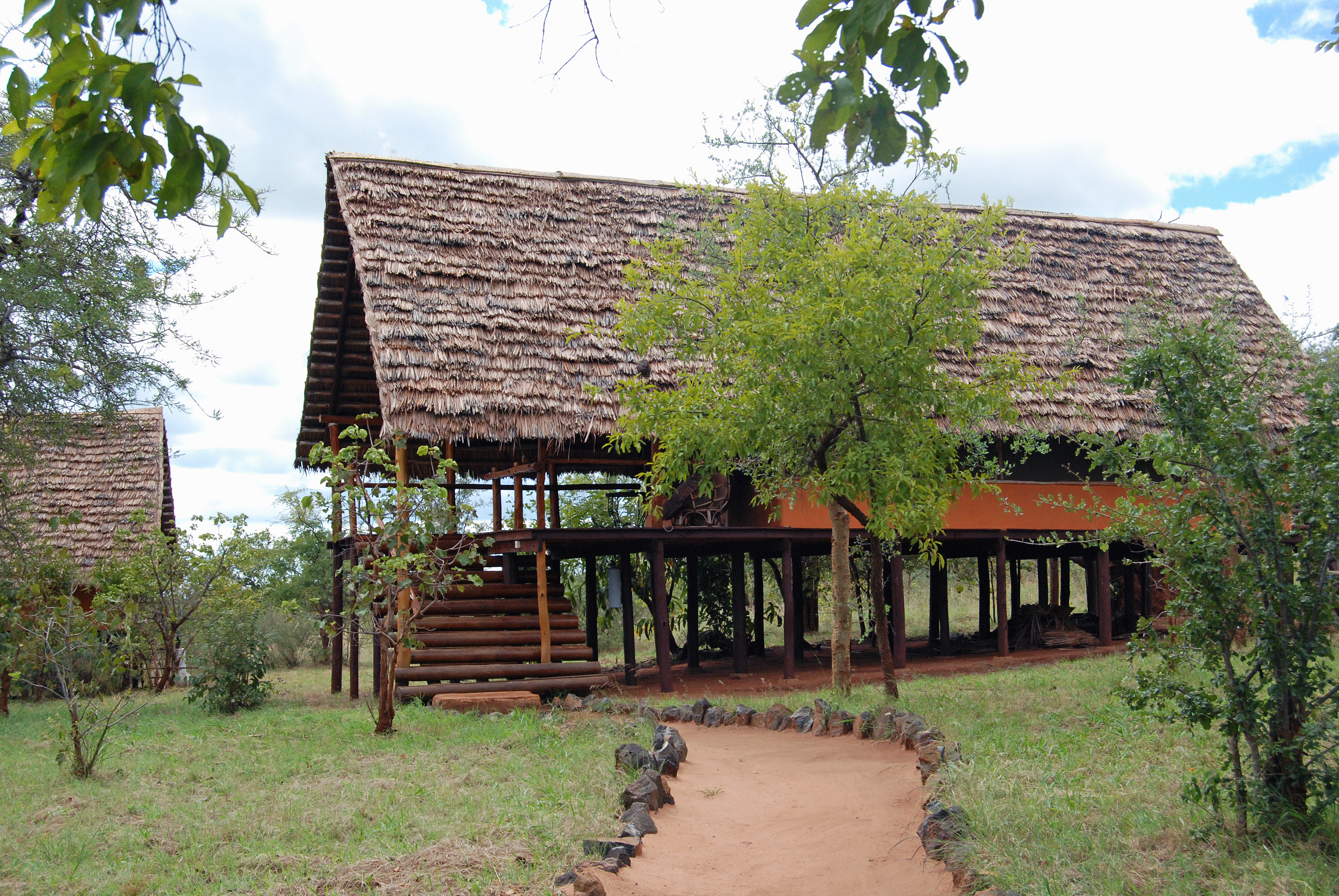
Kikoti Safari Camp in Tarangire National Park, Tanzania.

Ecotourism is a sub-component of the field of sustainable tourism. Ecotourism must serve to maximize ecological benefits while contributing to the economic, social, and cultural wellbeing of communities living close to ecotourism venues.

Even while ecotourism is often presented as a responsible form of tourism, it nonetheless carries several risks. Potential ecological, economic, and sociocultural benefits associated with ecotourism are described below.

=== Risks ===
Ecological risk: Ecotourism activities, or merely the presence of travelers in a particular region or location, may negatively impact the ecological integrity of protected areas.

Local communities may be negatively impacted by ecotourism. For example, like other forms of tourism, ecotourism may result in friction between tourists and local community members, and may increase the cost of rent, rates, and property values, thereby marginalizing local community members.

Health risks: Ecotourism carries known health risks for both tourists and local people, along with wildlife and ecosystems. Travelers may bring pathogens to ecologically sensitive areas, putting wildlife as well as local people at risk. Ecotourism activities may also place travelers at risk of health problems or injuries.

=== Benefits ===
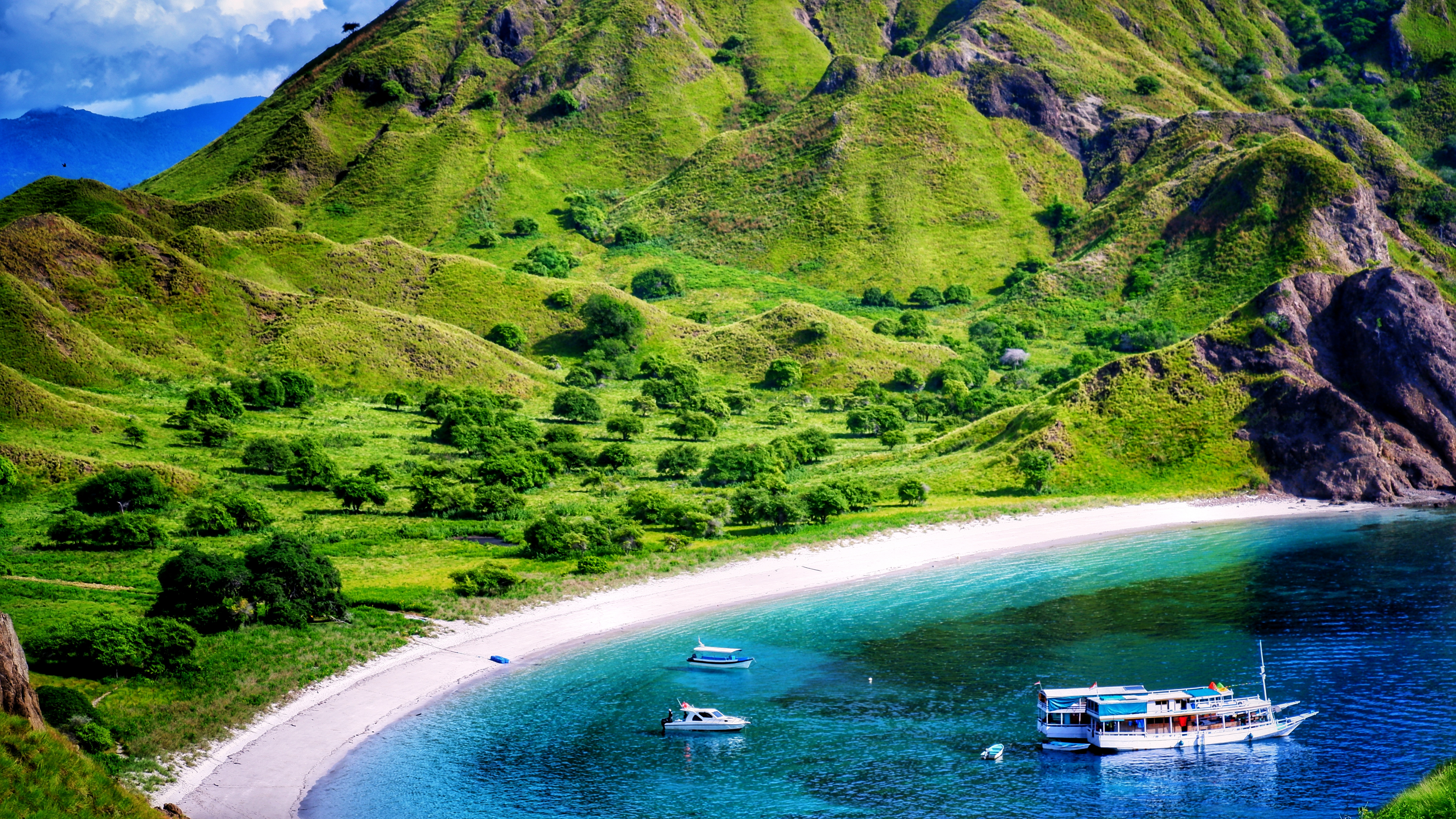
Tourist boats in Labuan Bajo, near Komodo National Park in Indonesia.

Ecotourism may also have positive ecological consequences, and some of them are listed below:

==== Direct benefits ====
- Incentive to protect natural environments
- Incentive to rehabilitate modified environments and lands
- Provides funds to manage and expand protected areas.
- Ecotourists assist with habitat maintenance and enhancement through their actions.
- Ecotourists may act as watchdogs or guardians who personally intervene in situations where the environment is perceived to be threatened.
- The locals may also learn new skills from the ecotourists.

==== Indirect benefits ====
- Exposure to ecotourism fosters a broader sense of environmentalism.
- Local people experience changes in environmental attitude and behavior.
- Areas protected for ecotourism provide environmental benefits.
- It sharpens the future well-being of the locals.

==== Potential economic benefits ====
For some decision-makers, economic factors are more compelling than ecological factors in deciding how natural resources should be used. Potential ecotourism economic benefits are presented below:

Direct benefits

- Generates revenue (related to visitor expenditures) and creates employment that is directly related to the sector
- Provides economic opportunities for peripheral regions

Indirect benefits

- High multiplier effect and indirect revenue employment
- Supports cultural and heritage tourism, sectors that are highly compatible with ecotourism.

==== Potential socio-cultural benefits ====
A holistic approach to ecotourism can promote socio-cultural benefits alongside economic growth and environmental protection. Ecotourism can support community stability and well-being by encouraging local participation and providing income for residents. In many cases, the money generated from tourism supports people living in the area. For example, 70% of the money made at national parks in South Africa comes directly from tourism revenue. Tourism revenue can also help fund national parks and protected areas, while also creating additional employment opportunities for people living in nearby communities.

Ecotourism can also provide aesthetic and spiritual benefits, allowing both locals and tourists to enjoy and appreciate nature. Furthermore, ecotourism can make natural areas accessible to a broad spectrum of the population.

However ecotourism may have unintended negative effects. These might be mitigated through regulations and codes of conduct that encourage appropriate visitor behavior and help protect local communities and the environment.

== Terminology and history ==
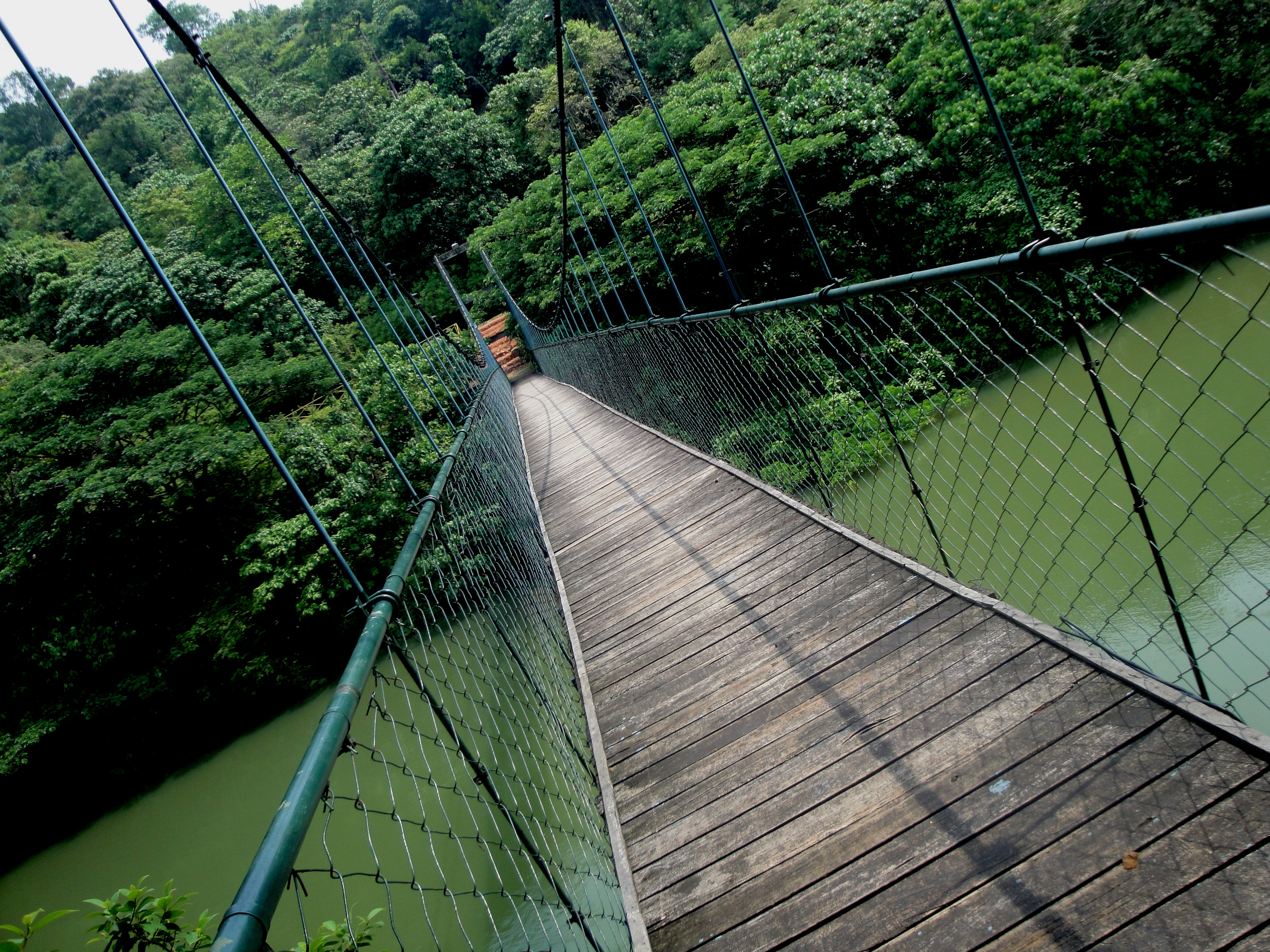
A hanging bridge in ecotourism area of Thenmala, Kerala in India - India's first planned ecotourism destination.

Ecotourism is a late 20th-century neologism compounded eco- and tourism. According to the Oxford English Dictionary, ecotour was first recorded in 1973 and ecotourism, "probably after ecotour", in 1982.

- ecotour, n. ... A tour of or visit to an area of ecological interest, usually with an educational element; (in later use also) a similar tour or visit designed to have as little detrimental effect on the ecology as possible or undertaken with the specific aim of helping conservation efforts.
- ecotourism, n. ... Tourism to areas of ecological interest (typically exotic and often threatened natural environments), esp. to support conservation efforts and observe wildlife; spec. access to an endangered environment controlled to have the least possible adverse effect.

Some sources suggest the terms were used nearly a decade earlier. Claus-Dieter (Nick) Hetzer, an academic and adventurer from Forum International in Berkeley, CA, coined the term ecotourism in 1965, according to the Contra Costa Times, and ran the first ecotours in the Yucatán during the early 1970s.

The definition of ecotourism adopted by Ecotourism Australia is: "Ecotourism is ecologically sustainable tourism with a primary focus on experiencing natural areas that foster environmental and cultural understanding, appreciation and conservation."

The Global Ecotourism Network (GEN) defines ecotourism as "responsible travel to natural areas that conserves the environment, sustains the well-being of the local people, and creates knowledge and understanding through interpretation and education of all involved (visitors, staff, and the visited)".

Ecotourism is often misinterpreted as any form of tourism that involves nature (see jungle tourism). Self-proclaimed practitioners and hosts of ecotourism experiences assume it is achieved by simply creating destinations in natural areas.

Some scholars argue that, while ecotourism is typically defined as a nature-oriented form of tourism, the core of which should include drawing tourists' attention to the beauty of nature and the fragility of the ecosystem, there is still debate about whether this viewpoint should become a universal standard. Critics point out that, despite the continuous growth of ecotourism, certain tourism organizations frequently utilize phrases like "green" or "sustainable" in their marketing as a form of greenwashing to attract environmentally conscious tourists. However, their real operating action may not properly satisfy their environmental protection responsibilities, perhaps leading to public confusion about the notion of ecotourism.

Although academics disagree about who can be classified as an ecotourist and there is little statistical data, some estimate that more than five million ecotourists—the majority of the ecotourist population—come from the United States, with many others from Western Europe, Canada, and Australia.

Currently, there are various moves to create national and international ecotourism certification programs. National ecotourism certification programs have been put in place in countries such as Costa Rica, Australia, Kenya, Estonia, and Sweden.

=== Related terms ===
==== Sustainable tourism ====
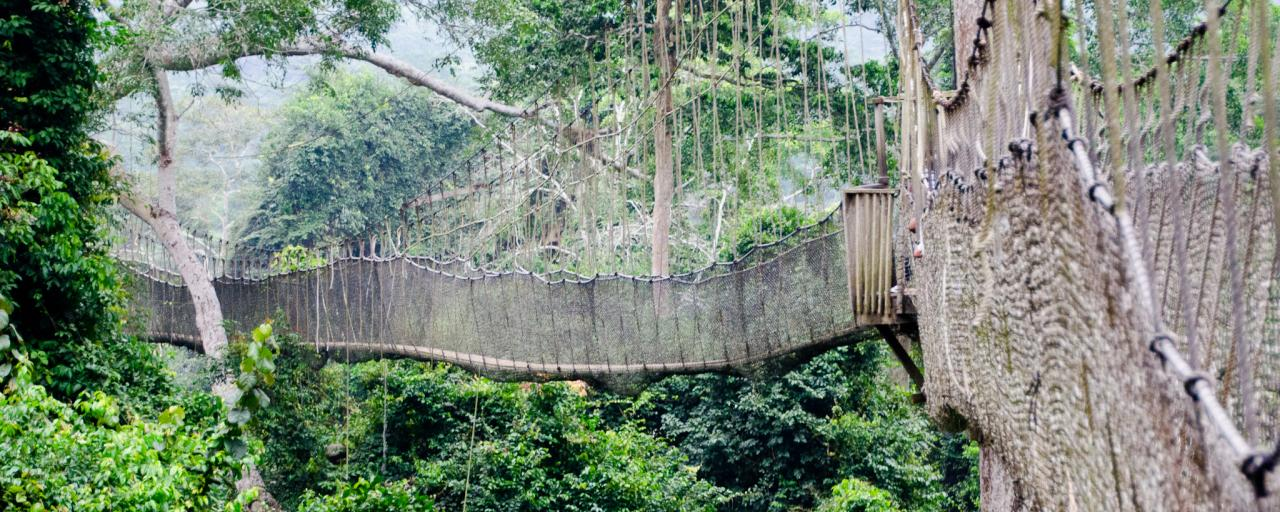
A canopy walkway at Kakum National Park in Ghana, ensuring that tourists have least direct impact on the surrounding ecology. The visitor park received the Global Tourism for Tomorrow Award in 1998.

Sustainable tourism is a concept that covers the complete tourism experience, including concern for economic, social, and environmental issues as well as attention to improving tourists' experiences and addressing the needs of host communities. Sustainable tourism should embrace concerns for environmental protection, social equity, and the quality of life, cultural diversity, and a dynamic, viable economy delivering jobs and prosperity for all. It has its roots in sustainable development and there can be some confusion as to what "sustainable tourism" means. There is now broad consensus that tourism should be sustainable. In fact, all forms of tourism have the potential to be sustainable if planned, developed and managed properly. Tourist development organizations are promoting sustainable tourism practices in order to mitigate negative effects caused by the growing impact of tourism, for example its environmental impacts.

The United Nations World Tourism Organization emphasized these practices by promoting sustainable tourism as part of the Sustainable Development Goals, through programs like the International Year for Sustainable Tourism for Development in 2017. There is a direct link between sustainable tourism and several of the 17 Sustainable Development Goals (SDGs). Tourism for SDGs focuses on how SDG 8 ("decent work and economic growth"), SDG 12 ("responsible consumption and production") and SDG 14 ("life below water") implicate tourism in creating a sustainable economy.

== Improving sustainability ==
=== Principles ===
Ecotourism in both terrestrial and marine ecosystems can benefit conservation, provided the complexities of history, culture, and ecology in the affected regions are successfully navigated. Catherine Macdonald and colleagues identify the factors that determine conservation outcomes, namely whether: animals and their habits are sufficiently protected; conflict between people and wildlife is avoided or at least suitably mitigated; there is good outreach and education of the local population into the benefits of ecotourism; there is effective collaboration with stakeholders in the area; and there is proper use of the money generated by ecotourism to conserve the local ecology. They conclude that ecotourism works best to conserve predators when the tourism industry is supported both politically and by the public, and when it is monitored and controlled at local, national, and international levels.

=== Regulation and accreditation ===
Because the regulations of ecotourism may be poorly implemented, ecologically destructive greenwashed operations like underwater hotels and helicopter tours can be categorized as ecotourism along with canoeing, camping, photography, and wildlife observation. The failure to acknowledge responsible, low-impact ecotourism puts legitimate ecotourism companies at a competitive disadvantage.

Management strategies to mitigate destructive operations include but are not limited to establishing a carrying capacity, site hardening, sustainable design, visitation quotas, fees, access restrictions, and visitor education.

Many environmentalists have argued for a global standard that can be used for certification, differentiating ecotourism companies based on their level of environmental commitment, creating a standard to follow. A national or international regulatory board would enforce accreditation procedures, with representation from various groups including governments, hotels, tour operators, travel agents, guides, airlines, local authorities, conservation organizations, and non-governmental organizations. The decisions of the board would be sanctioned by governments so that non-compliant companies would be legally required to disassociate themselves from the use of the ecotourism brand.

In 1998, Crinion suggested a Green Stars System, based on criteria including a management plan, benefits for the local community, small group interaction, education value, and staff training. Ecotourists who consider their choices would be confident of a genuine ecotourism experience when they see the higher star rating.

In 2008 the Global Sustainable Tourism Council Criteria was launched at the IUCN World Conservation Congress. The Criteria, managed by the Global Sustainable Tourism Council, created a global standard for sustainable travel and tourism and includes criteria and performance indicators for destinations, tour operators and hotels. The GSTC provides accreditation through a third party to Certification Bodies to legitimize claims of sustainability.

Environmental impact assessments could also be used as a form of accreditation. Feasibility is evaluated on a scientific basis, and recommendations could be made to optimally plan infrastructure, set tourist capacity, and manage the ecology. This form of accreditation is more sensitive to site-specific conditions.

Some countries have their certification programs for ecotourism. Costa Rica, for example, runs the GSTC-Recognized Certification of Sustainable Tourism (CST) program, which is intended to balance the effect that business has on the local environment. The CST program focuses on a company's interaction with natural and cultural resources, the improvement of quality of life within local communities, and the economic contribution to other programs of national development. CST uses a rating system that categorizes a company based on how sustainable its operations are. CST evaluates the interaction between the company and the surrounding habitat; the management policies and operation systems within the company; how the company encourages its clients to become active contributors towards sustainable policies; and the interaction between the company and local communities/the overall population. Based upon these criteria, the company is evaluated for the strength of its sustainability. The measurement index goes from 0 to 5, with 0 being the worst and 5 being the best.

=== Labels and certification ===
Over 50 ecolabels on tourism exist. These include (but are not limited to):

- Austrian Ecolabel for Tourism
- Asian Ecotourism Standard for Accommodations (AESA)
- Eco-certification Malta
- EarthCheck
- Ecotourism Australia
- Ecotourism Ireland
- Ecotourism Kenya
- European Ecotourism Labelling Standard (EETLS)
- Korean Ecotourism Standard

=== Guidelines and education ===
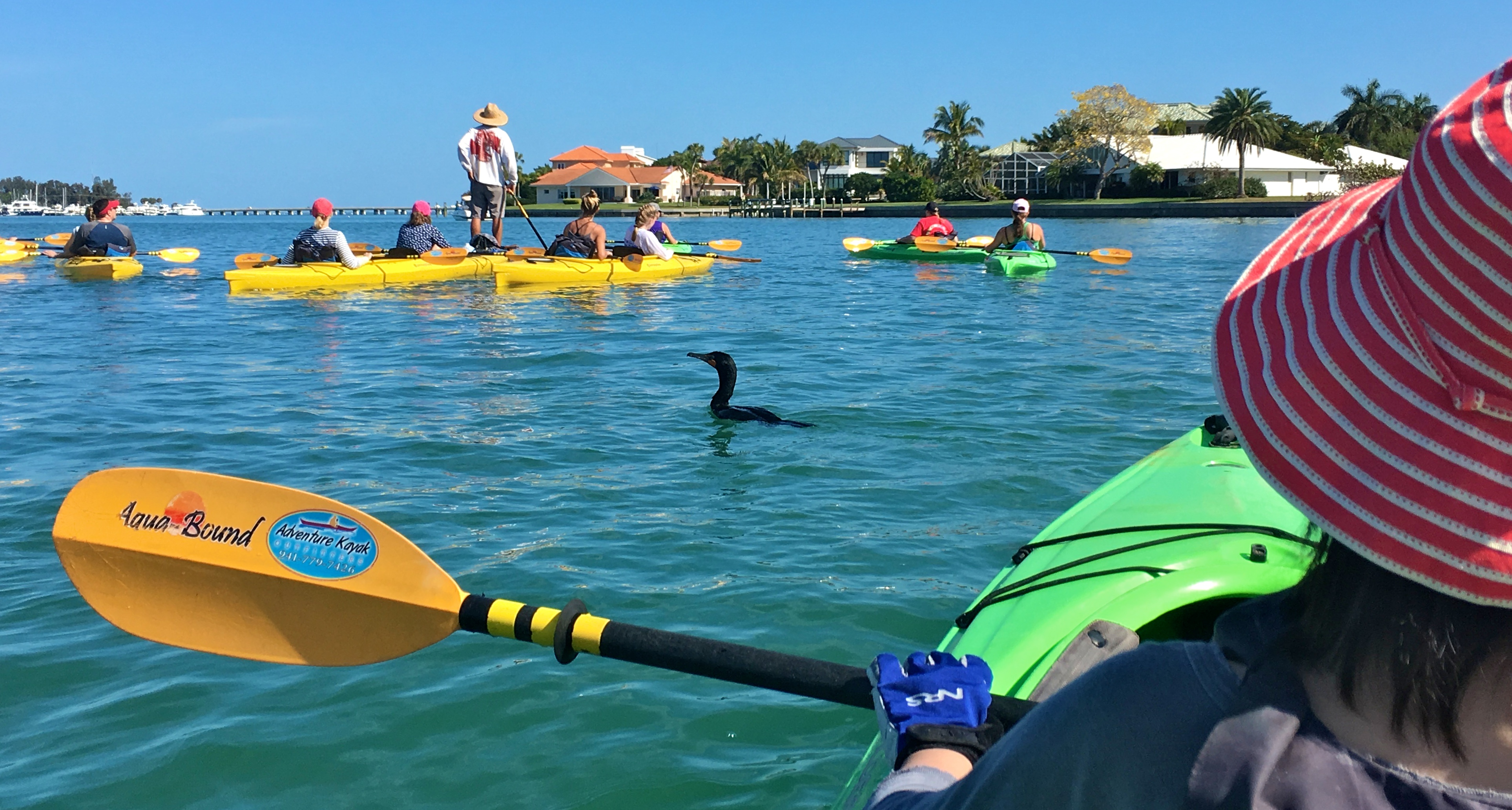
Ecotour guide stands on a kayak spotting dolphins and manatees, around Lido Key.

An environmental protection strategy must address the issue of ecotourists removed from the cause-and-effect of their actions on the environment. More initiatives should be carried out to improve their awareness, sensitize them to environmental issues, and care about the places they visit.

Tour guides are a direct medium to communicate awareness. Because they have trust of ecotourists and detailed knowledge of the local environment, tour guides can actively discuss conservation issues, and explain how visitors' actions can negatively impact their environment and the local communities. A tour guide training program in Costa Rica's Tortuguero National Park has helped reduce negative environmental impacts by educating tourists and regulating their activity on the parks' beaches where endangered sea turtles nest.

=== Small scale, slow growth, and local control ===
The theory of underdevelopment tourism describes the behavior of multinational corporations that control the development of ecotourism and reap the main benefits, which may lead to a loss of development ownership by local communities. This may limit the control of local communities over natural resources and raise discussions about the unequal distribution of ownership and benefits of tourism resources. These corporations finance and profit from the development of large-scale ecotourism that causes excessive environmental degradation, loss of traditional culture and way of life, and exploitation of local labor. In Zimbabwe and Nepal's Annapurna region, where underdevelopment is taking place, more than 90 percent of ecotourism revenues are expatriated to the parent countries, and less than 5 percent go into local communities.

The present sustainability challenges in ecotourism initiatives have drawn attention to small-scale, slow-growth, and locally community-based tourism development models, which are thought to be better suited to meeting long-term ecological and social objectives. Local peoples have a vested interest in the well-being of their community and are therefore more accountable to environmental protection than multinational corporations, though they receive very little of the profits. The lack of control, westernization, adverse impacts to the environment, and loss of culture and traditions outweigh the benefits of establishing large-scale ecotourism. Additionally, culture loss can be attributed to cultural commodification, in which local cultures are commodified to make a profit.

The increased contributions of communities to locally managed ecotourism create viable economic opportunities, including high-level management positions, and reduce environmental issues associated with poverty and unemployment. Because the ecotourism experience is marketed to a different lifestyle from large-scale ecotourism, the development of facilities and infrastructure does not need to conform to corporate Western tourism standards, and can be much simpler and less expensive. There is a greater multiplier effect on the economy, because local products, materials, and labor are used. Profits accrue locally and import leakages are reduced. The Great Barrier Reef Park in Australia reported over half of a billion dollars of indirect income in the area and added thousands of indirect jobs between 2004 and 2005.

However, even this form of tourism may require foreign investment for promotion or start-up. When such investments are required, communities must find a company or non-governmental organization that reflects the philosophy of ecotourism; is sensitive to their concerns, and is willing to cooperate at the expense of profit. The basic assumption of the multiplier effect is that the economy starts with unused resources, for example, that many workers are cyclically unemployed and much of industrial capacity is sitting idle or incompletely used. By increasing demand in the economy, it is then possible to boost production. If the economy was already at full employment, with only structural, frictional, or other supply-side types of unemployment, any attempt to boost demand would only lead to inflation. The multiplier impact is frequently employed in ecotourism research to demonstrate the driving force behind tourism expenditure on the local economy. However, there are still differing opinions in macroeconomics on the multiplier theory's validity, and different schools of thought have different understandings of the circumstances for its use and the mechanism by which it works.

As an example, consider the government increasing its expenditure on roads by $1 million, without a corresponding increase in taxation. This sum would go to the road builders, who would hire more workers and distribute the money as wages and profits. The households receiving these incomes will save part of the money and spend the rest on consumer goods. These expenditures, in turn, will generate more jobs, wages, profits, and so on with the income and spending circulating the economy.

The multiplier effect arises because of the induced increases in consumer spending which occur due to the increased incomes – and because of the feedback into increasing business revenues, jobs, and income again. This process does not lead to an economic explosion not only because of the supply-side barriers at potential output (full employment) but because at each "round", the increase in consumer spending is less than the increase in consumer incomes. That is, the marginal propensity to consume (MPC) is less than one so that each round some extra income goes into saving, leaking out of the cumulative process. Each increase in spending is thus smaller than that of the previous round, preventing an explosion.

=== Efforts to preserve ecosystems at risk ===
Some of the world's most exceptional biodiversity is located in the Galapagos Islands. These islands were designated a UNESCO World Heritage site in 1979, then added to UNESCO's List of World Heritage in Danger in 2007. IGTOA is a non-profit dedicated to preserving this living laboratory against the challenges of invasive species, human impact, and tourism. For travelers who want to be mindful of the environment and the impact of tourism, it is recommended to use an operator that is endorsed by an ecotourism organization. In the case of the Galapagos, IGTOA has a list of the world's premiere Galapagos Islands tour companies dedicated to the lasting protection and preservation of the destination.

== Natural resource management ==
Natural resource management can be used as a specialized tool for the development of ecotourism. There are several places throughout the world where several natural resources are abundant, but with human encroachment and habitats, these resources are depleting. Without the sustainable use of certain resources, they are destroyed, and floral and fauna species are becoming extinct. Ecotourism programs can be introduced for the conservation of these resources. Several plans and proper management programs can be introduced so that these resources remain untouched, and there are many organizations–including nonprofits–and scientists working on this field.

Natural resources of hill areas like Kurseong in West Bengal are plenty in number with various flora and fauna, but tourism for business purpose poised the situation. Researchers from Jadavpur University are presently working in this area for the development of ecotourism to be used as a tool for natural resource management.

In Southeast Asia government and nongovernmental organizations are working together with academics and industry operators to spread the economic benefits of tourism into the kampungs and villages of the region. A recently formed alliance, the South-East Asian Tourism Organization (SEATO), is bringing together these diverse players to discuss resource management concerns.

A 2002 summit held in Quebec led to the 2008 Global Sustainable Tourism Criteria–a collaborative effort between the UN Foundation and other advocacy groups. The criteria, which are voluntary, involve the following standards: "effective sustainability planning, maximum social and economic benefits for local communities, minimum negative impacts on cultural heritage, and minimum negative impacts on the environment." There is no enforcing agency or system of punishments for summit.

== Impact on indigenous people and indigenous land ==
Valorization of the Indigenous territories can be important for designation as a protected area, which can deter threats such as deforestation. Ecotourism can help bring in revenue for Indigenous peoples.

However, there needs to be a proper business plan and organizational structure, which helps to ensure that the generated money from ecotourism indeed flows towards the Indigenous peoples themselves, and the protection of the Indigenous territory. Debates around ecotourism focus on how profits off of Indigenous lands are enjoyed by international tourist companies, who do not share back with the people to whom those lands belong. Ecotourism offers a tourist-appealing experience of the landscape and environment, one that is different from the experience of the residents; it commodifies the lives of Indigenous people and their land which is not fair to its inhabitants.

Indigenous territories are managed by governmental services (i.e. FUNAI in Brazil, ...) and these governmental services can thus decide whether or not to implement ecotourism in these Indigenous territories.

Ecotourism can also bring in employment to the local people (which may be Indigenous people). Protected areas for instance require park rangers, and staff to maintain and operate the ecolodges and accommodation used by tourists. Also, the traditional culture can act as a tourist attraction, and can create a source of revenue by asking payment for the showing of performances (i.e., traditional dance, ...) Ecotourism can also help mitigate deforestation that happens when local residents, under economic stress, clear lands and create smallholder plots to grow cash crops. Such land clearing hurts the environment. Ecotourism can be a sustainable and job-creating alternative for local populations.

Depending on how protected areas are set up and handled, it can lead to local people losing their homes, usually with no compensation. Pushing people onto marginal lands with harsh climates, poor soils, lack of water, and infested with livestock and disease does little to enhance livelihoods even when a proportion of ecotourism profits are directed back into the community. Harsh survival realities and deprivation of traditional use of land and natural resources by local people can occur. Local Indigenous people may also feel strong resentment towards the change, especially if tourism has been allowed to develop with virtually no controls. Without sufficient control mechanisms, too many lodges may be built, and tourist vehicles may drive off-track and harass the wildlife. Vehicle use may erode and degrade the land.

There is a longstanding failure by the Peruvian government to acknowledge and protect Indigenous lands, and therefore the Indigenous peoples have been forced to protect their own land. The land has a better chance of staying safe and free from deforestation if the people who care about the land are the ones maintaining it.

== Criticism ==
=== Definition ===
In the continuum of tourism activities that stretch from conventional tourism to ecotourism, there has been a lot of contention to the limit at which biodiversity preservation, local social-economic benefits, and environmental impact can be considered "ecotourism". For this reason, environmentalists, special interest groups, and governments define ecotourism differently. Environmental organizations have generally insisted that ecotourism is nature-based, sustainably managed, conservation supporting, and environmentally educated. The tourist industry and governments, however, focus more on the product aspect, treating ecotourism as equivalent to any sort of tourism based in nature. As a further complication, many terms are used under the rubric of ecotourism. Nature tourism, low impact tourism, green tourism, bio-tourism, ecologically responsible tourism, and others have been used in literature and marketing, although they are not necessarily synonymous with ecotourism.

The problems associated with defining ecotourism have often led to confusion among tourists and academics. Many problems are also subject of considerable public controversy and concern because of green washing, a trend towards the commercialization of tourism schemes disguised as sustainable, nature based, and environmentally friendly ecotourism. According to McLaren, these schemes are environmentally destructive, economically exploitative, and culturally insensitive at its worst. They are also morally disconcerting because they mislead tourists and manipulate their concerns for the environment. The development and success of such large scale, energy intensive, and ecologically unsustainable schemes are a testament to the tremendous profits associated with being labeled as ecotourism.

=== Negative impact ===
Ecotourism has become one of the fastest-growing sectors of the tourism industry. One definition of ecotourism is "the practice of low-impact, educational, ecologically and culturally sensitive travel that benefits local communities and host countries". Many of the ecotourism projects are not meeting these standards. Even if some of the guidelines are being executed, the local communities are still facing many of the negative impacts. The other negative side of ecotourism is that it transforms nature and the environment into commodities people are interested in paying and visiting. When the environment becomes a product with economic value, people try to advertise and sell it. Some of the ecotourism sites are turning to private sectors, and the government cut off their funding. Hence, they are obligated to make money on their own. Private natural parks and sites are looking for their own advantage by advertising the soundness of natural parks or coastal marines in the Caribbean. They try to show they are protecting nature and attract people interested in ecotourism. However, they will focus on the phenomenon that might be more interesting for tourists and neglect other aspects of nature when they prioritize their profits. Consequently, this policy will result in abandoning rich ecological sites or destroying those valuable sites. For example, in Montego Bay, hotel staff cut the seagrass that appeared to drive back tourists; conversely, they are crucial for local nutrient cycles.

The other problem is that the companies try to hide the truth behind the ecotourism to maintain their profit. They do not cover the fact that traveling from other countries to the natural sites burns extensive amounts of aircraft fuel. In Montego Bay and Negril, a considerable amount of run-off is released to the coastal water produced directly or indirectly by ecotourists. Hotels in Jamaica release much more wastewater than a city. The tourists generate a lot of waste that ends up in the coastal water. The indirect effect of ecotourism in Jamaica is that many people migrated to the town near the natural site because of the more job opportunities due to construction increase, resulting in destroying the environment. South Africa is one of the countries that is reaping significant economic benefits from ecotourism, but the negative effects far outweigh the positive—including forcing people to leave their homes, gross violations of fundamental rights, and environmental hazards—far outweigh the medium-term economic benefits. A tremendous amount of money and human resources continue to be used for ecotourism despite unsuccessful outcomes, and even more, money is put into public relation campaigns to dilute the effects of criticism. Ecotourism channels resources away from other projects that could contribute more sustainable and realistic solutions to pressing social and environmental problems. "The money tourism can generate often ties parks and managements to ecotourism". But there is a tension in this relationship because ecotourism often causes conflict and changes in land-use rights, fails to deliver promises of community-level benefits, damages environments, and has many other social impacts. Indeed, many argue repeatedly that ecotourism is neither ecologically nor socially beneficial, yet it persists as a strategy for conservation and development due to the large profits. While several studies are being done on ways to improve the ecotourism structure, some argue that these examples provide a rationale for stopping it altogether. However, there are some positive examples, among them the Kavango-Zambezi Transfrontier Conservation Area (KAZA) and the Virunga National Park, as judged by WWF.

The ecotourism system exercises tremendous financial and political influence. The evidence above shows that a strong case exists for restraining such activities in certain locations. Funding could be used for field studies aimed at finding alternative solutions to tourism and the diverse problems Africa faces in result of urbanization, industrialization, and the overexploitation of agriculture.

At the local level, ecotourism has become a source of conflict over land management and tourism profits. In this case, ecotourism has harmed the environment and local people and has led to conflicts over profit distribution. Very few regulations or laws stand in place as boundaries for the investors in ecotourism. Calls have been made for more efforts toward educating tourists of the environmental and social effects of their travels, and for laws to prohibit the promotion of unsustainable ecotourism projects and materials which project false images of destinations and demean local and Indigenous cultures.

Though conservation efforts in East Africa are indisputably serving the interests of tourism in the region it is important to make the distinction between conservation acts and the tourism industry. Eastern African communities are not the only of developing regions to experience economic and social harms from conservation efforts. Conservation in the Southwest Yunnan Region of China has similarly brought drastic changes to traditional land use in the region. Prior to logging restrictions imposed by the Chinese Government the industry made up 80 percent of the regions revenue. Following a complete ban on commercial logging the Indigenous people of the Yunnan region now see little opportunity for economic development. Ecotourism may provide solutions to the economic hardships suffered from the loss of industry to conservation in the Yunnan in the same way that it may serve to remedy the difficulties faced by the Maasai. As stated, the ecotourism structure must be improved to direct more money into host communities by reducing leakages for the industry to be successful in alleviating poverty in developing regions, but it provides a promising opportunity.

Drumm and Moore (2002) discuss the price increase and economic leakage in their paper; saying that prices might augment since the visitors are more capable to pay higher rates for goods and services in opposition to the locals. Also, they have mentioned two solutions regarding the previous issue: (1) either a two pricing system represented as two separate price lists (the first for the locals and the second for the tourists with respect to the local's purchase power ability); (2) design unique goods and services subject only or the tourists' consumption. Leakage appears when international investors import foreign products instead of using local resources; thus, the tourists will be using international products and in-turn contributing to the outside economy rather than the local one (Drumm & Moore, 2002).

=== Direct environmental impacts ===
Ecotourism operations occasionally fail to live up to conservation ideals. It is sometimes overlooked that ecotourism is a highly consumer-centered activity, and that environmental conservation is a means to further economic growth.

Although ecotourism is intended for small groups, even a modest increase in population, however temporary, puts extra pressure on the local environment and necessitates the development of additional infrastructure and amenities. The construction of water treatment plants, sanitation facilities, and lodges come with the exploitation of non-renewable energy sources and the use of already limited local resources. The conversion of natural land to such tourist infrastructure is implicated in deforestation and habitat destruction of butterflies in Mexico and squirrel monkeys in Costa Rica. In other cases, the environment suffers because local communities are unable to meet the infrastructure demands of ecotourism. The lack of adequate sanitation facilities in many East African parks results in the disposal of campsite sewage in rivers, contaminating the wildlife, livestock, and people who draw drinking water from it.

Aside from environmental degradation with tourist infrastructure, population pressures from ecotourism also leaves behind garbage and pollution associated with the Western lifestyle. An example of this is seen with ecotourism in Antarctica. Since it is such a remote location, it takes a lot of fuel to get there; resulting in ships producing large pollution through waste disposal and green house gas emissions. Additionally, there is a potential for oil spills from damaged ships traversing through aggressive waters filled with natural obstacles such as icebergs. Although ecotourists claim to be educationally sophisticated and environmentally concerned, they rarely understand the ecological consequences of their visits and how their day-to-day activities append physical impacts on the environment. As one scientist observes, they "rarely acknowledge how the meals they eat, the toilets they flush, the water they drink, and so on, are all part of broader regional economic and ecological systems they are helping to reconfigure with their very activities." Nor do ecotourists recognize the great consumption of non-renewable energy required to arrive at their destination, which is typically more remote than conventional tourism destinations. For instance, an exotic journey to a place 10,000 kilometers away consumes about 700 liters of fuel per person.

Ecotourism activities are issues in environmental impact because they may disturb fauna and flora. Ecotourists believe that because they are only taking pictures and leaving footprints, they keep ecotourism sites pristine, but even harmless-sounding activities such as nature hikes can be ecologically destructive. In the Annapurna Circuit in Nepal, ecotourists have worn down the marked trails and created alternate routes, contributing to soil compaction, erosion, and plant damage. Where the ecotourism activity involves wildlife viewing, it can scare away animals, disrupt their feeding and nesting sites, or acclimate them to the presence of people. In Kenya, wildlife-observer disruption drives cheetahs off their reserves, increasing the risk of inbreeding and further endangering the species. In a study done from 1995 to 1997 off the Northwestern coast of Australia, scientists found that whale sharks' tolerance for divers and swimmers decreased. The whale sharks showed an increase in behaviors over the course of the study, such as diving, porpoising, banking, and eye rolling that are associated with distress and attempt to avoid the diver. The average time the whale sharks spent with the divers in 1995 was 19.3 minutes, but in 1997 the average time the whale sharks spent with the divers was 9.5 minutes. There was also an increase in recorded behaviors from 56% of the sharks showing any sort of diving, porpoising, eye rolling or banking in 1995 to 70.7% in 1997. Some whale sharks were also observed to have scars that were consistent with being struck by a boat.

=== Environmental hazards ===
The industrialization, urbanization and agricultural practices of human society are having a serious impact on the environment. Ecotourism is now also considered to be playing a role in environmental depletion including deforestation, disruption of ecological life systems and various forms of pollution, all of which contribute to environmental degradation. For example, the number of motor vehicles crossing a park increases as tour drivers search for rare species. The number of roads disrupts the grass cover, which has serious consequences on plant and animal species. These areas also have a higher rate of disturbances and invasive species due to increasing traffic off of the beaten path into new, undiscovered areas. Ecotourism also has an effect on species through the value placed on them. "Certain species have gone from being little known or valued by local people to being highly valued commodities. The commodification of plants may erase their social value and lead to overproduction within protected areas. Local people and their images can also be turned into commodities". Kamuaro points out the relatively obvious contradiction that any commercial venture into unspoiled, pristine land inevitably means a higher pressure on the environment. The people who live in the areas now becoming ecotourism spots have very different lifestyles than those who come to visit. Ecotourism has created many debates based on if the economic benefits are worth the possible environmental sacrifices.

=== Beneficiaries ===
Most forms of ecotourism are owned by foreign investors and corporations that provide few benefits to the local people. An overwhelming majority of profits are put into the pockets of investors instead of reinvestment into the local economy or environmental protection leading to further environmental degradation. The limited numbers of local people who are employed in the economy enter at its lowest level and are unable to live in tourist areas because of meager wages and a two-market system.

In some cases, the resentment by local people results in environmental degradation. As a highly publicized case, the Maasai nomads in Kenya killed wildlife in national parks but are now helping the national park to save the wildlife to show aversion to unfair compensation terms and displacement from traditional lands. The lack of economic opportunities for local people also constrains them to degrade the environment as a means of sustenance. The presence of affluent ecotourists encourage the development of destructive markets in wildlife souvenirs, such as the sale of coral trinkets on tropical islands and animal products in Asia, contributing to illegal harvesting and poaching from the environment. In Suriname, sea turtle reserves use a very large portion of their budget to guard against these destructive activities.

=== Eviction of Indigenous peoples ===
Fortress conservation is a conservation model based on the belief that biodiversity protection is best achieved by creating protected areas where ecosystems can function in isolation from human disturbance. It is argued that money generated from ecotourism is the motivating factor to drive Indigenous inhabitants off the land. Up to 250,000 people worldwide have been forcibly evicted from their homes to make way for conservation projects since 1990, according to the UN special rapporteur on the rights of Indigenous peoples.

=== Mismanagement by government ===
While governments are typically entrusted with the administration and enforcement of environmental protection, they often lack the commitment or capability to manage ecotourism sites. The regulations for environmental protection may be vaguely defined, costly to implement, hard to enforce, and uncertain in effectiveness. Government regulatory agencies, are susceptible to making decisions that spend on politically beneficial but environmentally unproductive projects. Because of prestige and conspicuousness, the construction of an attractive visitor center at an ecotourism site may take precedence over more pressing environmental concerns like acquiring habitat, protecting endemic species, and removing invasive ones. Finally, influential groups can pressure, and sway the interests of the government to their favor. The government and its regulators can become vested in the benefits of the ecotourism industry which they are supposed to regulate, causing restrictive environmental regulations and enforcement to become more lenient.

Management of ecotourism sites by private ecotourism companies offers an alternative to the cost of regulation and deficiency of government agencies. It is believed that these companies have a self-interest in limited environmental degradation because tourists will pay more for pristine environments, which translates to higher profit. However, theory indicates that this practice is not economically feasible and will fail to manage the environment.

The model of monopolistic competition states that distinctiveness will entail profits, but profits will promote imitation. A company that protects its ecotourism sites is able to charge a premium for the novel experience and pristine environment. But when other companies view the success of this approach, they also enter the market with similar practices, increasing competition and reducing demand. Eventually, the demand will be reduced until the economic profit is zero. A cost-benefit analysis shows that the company bears the cost of environmental protection without receiving the gains. Without economic incentive, the whole premise of self-interest through environmental protection is quashed; instead, ecotourism companies will minimize environment related expenses and maximize tourism demand.

The tragedy of the commons offers another model for economic unsustainability from environmental protection, in ecotourism sites used by many companies. Although there is a communal incentive to protect the environment, maximizing the benefits in the long run, a company will conclude that it is in their best interest to use the ecotourism site beyond its sustainable level. By increasing the number of ecotourists, for instance, a company gains all the economic benefit while paying only a part of the environmental cost. In the same way, a company recognizes that there is no incentive to actively protect the environment; they bear all the costs, while the benefits are shared by all other companies. The result, again, is mismanagement.

Taken together, the mobility of foreign investment and lack of economic incentive for environmental protection means that ecotourism companies are disposed to establishing themselves in new sites once their existing one is sufficiently degraded.

In addition, the systematic literature review conducted by Cabral and Dhar (2019) have identified several challenges due to slow progression of ecotourism initiatives such as (a) economic leakages, (b) lack of government involvement, (c) skill deficiency among the local communities, (d) absence of disseminating environmental education, (e) sporadic increase in pollution, (f) conflict between tourism management personnel and local communities and (g) inadequate infrastructure development.

== See also ==
- Eco hotel – Environmentally sustainable hotel
- Ecotourism in Africa
- Ecotourism in the Amazon rainforest – Large rainforest in South America
- Ecotourism routes in Europe
- Ecomuseum – Museum focused on the identity of a place
- Environmental movement – Movement for addressing environmental issues
- Environmental protection – Practice of protecting the natural environment
- Geotourism – Tourism associated with geological attractions and destinations
- Green hunting – Non-lethal alternative to hunting using tranquilization
- Jungle tourism – Tourism around the jungles of the world
- Shark tourism – Tourism industry for viewing wild sharks
- Sustainable development – Mode of human development
- Overtourism
