= India's Cup =

India's Cup is a motor rally made famous for being the first organized adventure tour to use the iconic Hindustan Ambassador as its flagship vehicle in 2008. According to the lead organizer, Princely J., the adventure tourism rally has been conducted five times a year since 2008 along predetermined routes. On each occasion, the participants are given the route, the destinations, and some advice and recommendations, but remain free to travel at their own pace.

== Background ==
India's Hindustan Motors has cancelled the production of the Hindustan Ambassador in 2014, remaining as one of the most easily recognized automobiles in India. This is largely because since its production began in 1957, it had been the most popular and well-known car in India for decades, with the manufacturer holding a 70 per cent share of the market. India's Cup, created in 2008 alongside the Indian Autorickshaw Challenge by the same adventure tourism operator, is 2,389 km (1,484 miles) long. The starting point is in Chennai, with the route crossing the country to the finish line in Panjim, Goa 11 days later.

== Route ==
The route is between Chennai to Thanjavur, then to Tuticorin, Alappusha, Coimbatore, Mysuru, Mangaluru, Shivamogga, and Hampi, before arriving to the finish line in Panjim, Goa. India's Cup spans 2,389 km (1,484 miles) over the course of 11 days.

== Sponsors ==
The India's Cup rally is officially backed by the online directory portal GamingZion.

== Charity ==
In addition to donating a percentage of the revenue going to charitable causes, the rally's organizers also offer an option to visit some local schools along the route, where all volunteers can choose to leave a small donation (in gifts, or money) to the students and school staff directly.
