= Väski =

Island in Naantali, Finland

Coordinates: 60°29′10″N 21°58′43″E

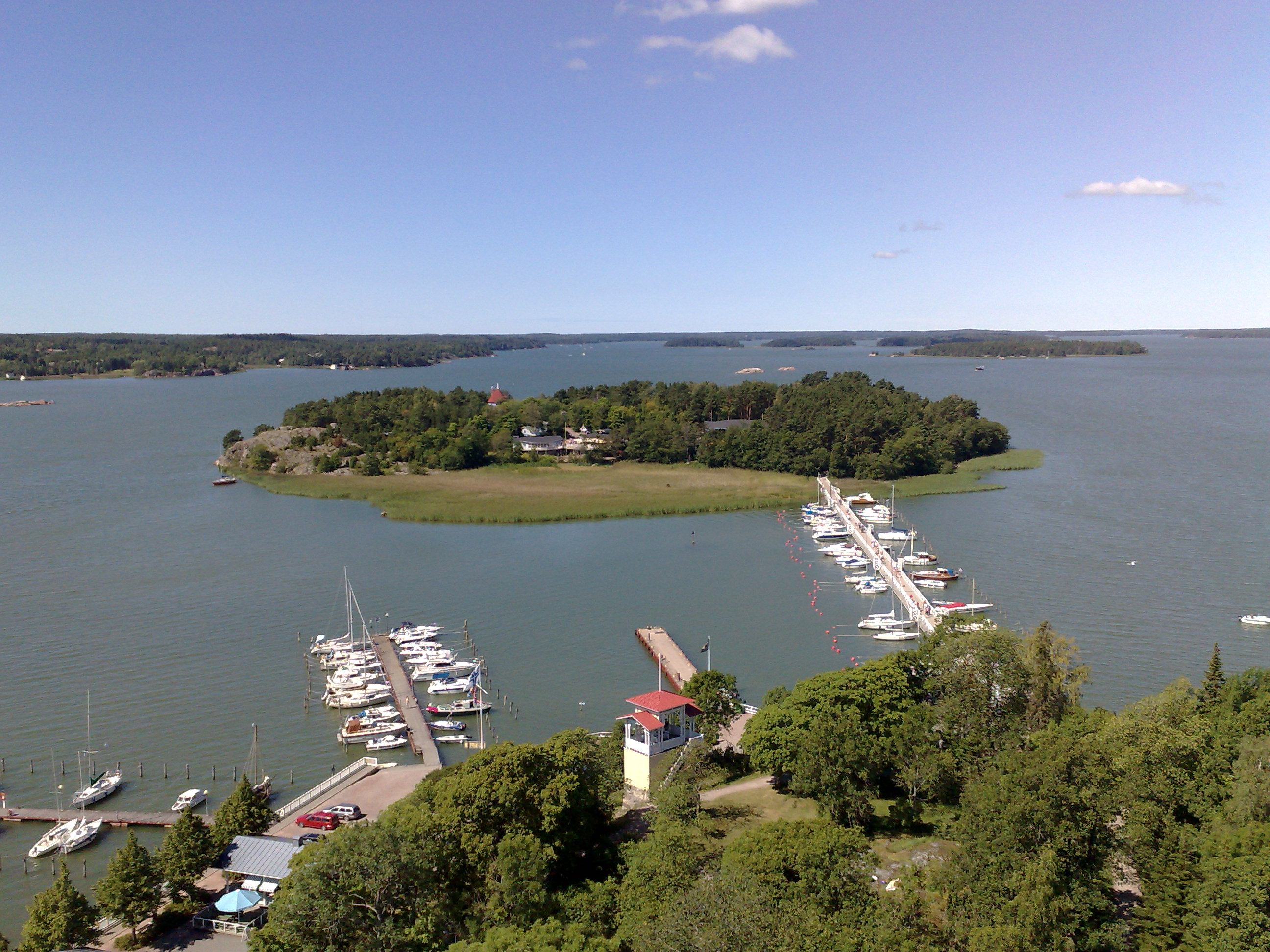
Island of Kailo in Naantali, Finland.

Väski is an island off the coast of Naantali, next to Kailo island which houses the theme park Muumimaailma in the Turku archipelago of southern Finland.

The island is a tourist spot and is organised as a location for adventure holidays.

The MTV3 mini film Aarresaaren sankarit was filmed there in 2003.

== Other uses ==
- vaski is the Finnish name for copper and its alloys.
