= Catalytic Finance Foundation =

R20 - Regions of Climate Action
- Founded: November 2010
- Type: Non-profit environmental organization
- Purpose: Help sub-national governments around the world to develop and finance low-carbon and climate-resilient economic development projects.
- Headquarters: 48 Chemin Du Grand Montfleury, CH 1209 Versoix, Geneva, Switzerland
- Location: Geneva (headquarters), Santa Monica, Beijing, Rio de Janeiro, Oran
- Official language: English, French
- Founder: Arnold Schwarzenegger
- Key people: Magnus Berntsson (President), Christophe Nuttall (Executive Director), Terry Tamminen (Strategic Advisor to the Founding Chair), Arnold Schwarzenegger (Founding Chairman)
- Website: www.catalyticfinance.org

The R20 – Regions of Climate Action is a non-profit environmental organization founded in September 2011, by former governor of California, Arnold Schwarzenegger, with the support of the United Nations. R20 is a coalition of sub-national governments, private companies, international organizations, NGOs, and academic & financial institutions. Its mission is to accelerate sub-national infrastructure investments in the green economy to meaningfully contribute to the Sustainable Development Goals (SDGs). The NGO operates at the sub-national level as R20 believes sub-national governments constitute a powerful force for change and are best positioned to take action & implement green projects.

R20's efforts are designed to support sub-national governments around the world to develop and finance low-carbon and climate resilient infrastructure projects in the field of renewable energy, energy efficient lighting and waste optimisation.

In June 2023, R20 became the Catalytic Finance Foundation.

== Mission and methodology ==
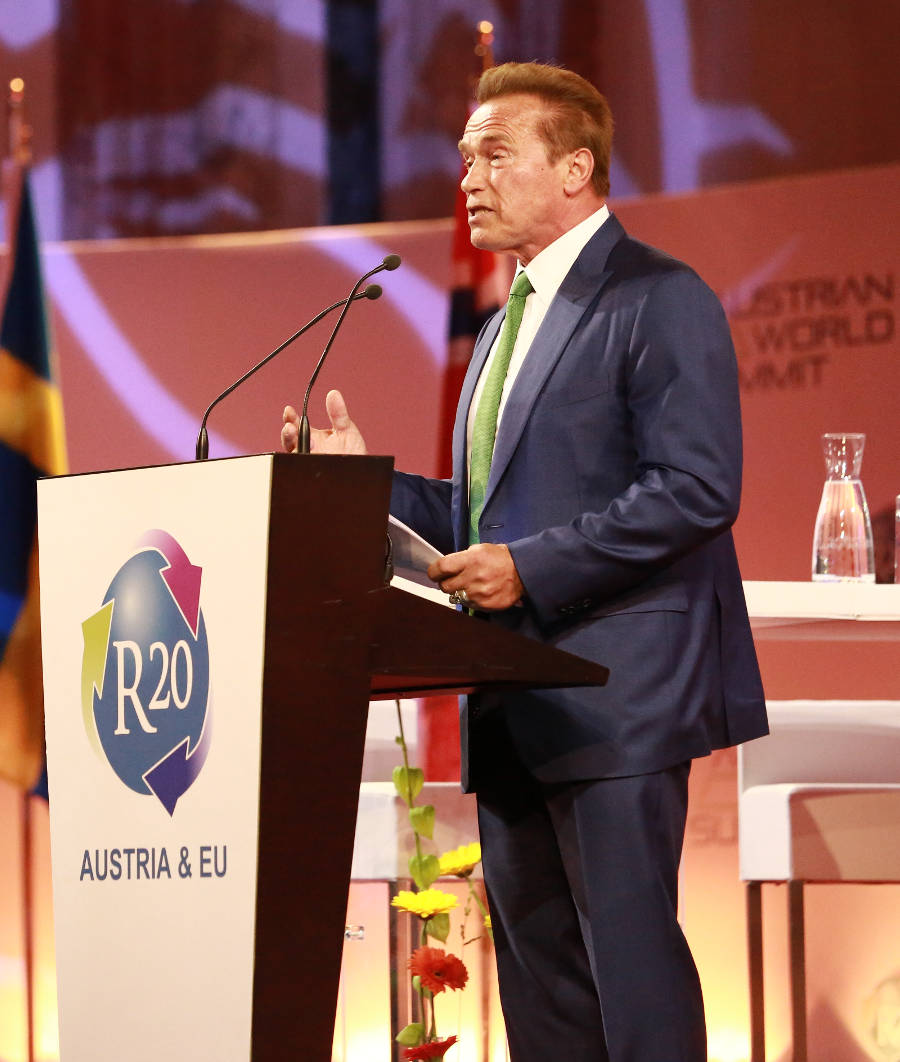
R20 founder Arnold Schwarzenegger speaks at the R20 AUSTRIAN WORLD SUMMIT 2017 in Vienna

While sub-national governments (provinces, regions, cities, etc.) are at the center of R20's work, the NGO recognizes that fast-tracking the transition to inclusive, resilient and low-carbon societies requires greater mobilization and collaboration between a wide range of stakeholders. This is why R20's approach aims to “connect the dots” and foster understanding and interconnection between policy-makers, clean technology providers and public-private investors throughout the whole project development value chain.

=== An integrated approach to accelerate green infrastructure development and financing. ===
Through collaboration and with support from many partners, including the Leonardo DiCaprio Foundation, R20 has created a value chain approach that facilitates the identification, structuring, development (or bankability) and financing of green infrastructure projects. Sub-national governments from around the world can benefit from this one stop shop to improve the sustainability of their regions.

1. Project Identification: R20 works with sub-national governments and other networks of regions to identify potential green infrastructure projects and secure political support for their development.
2. Project Structuring: Together with Foundations and academic institutions, R20 conducts workshops and training programs to facilitate the structuring and design of projects identified.
3. Project Bankability: R20 works with its corporate partners to help project developers perform feasibility studies and ensure bankability of projects.
4. Project Financing: R20 works with Foundations and Impact Fund Managers to provide and attract investment capital to fund project implementation.
5. Project MRV: R20 works with MRV standards and implementer to Measure, Report and Verify projects contributions to GHG emission reduction and impact towards the SDGs.

== Governance board ==
Since June 2017, R20 consists of R20 – Regions of Climate Action (Association) and the R20 Foundation, which work as two complementary entities. The association carries out day-to-day operational duties, and the foundation manages important investment decisions.

=== R20 - Regions of Climate Action (Association) ===
The R20 Association is legally structured as a Swiss association. On behalf of the General Assembly of members, the governing board carries out all acts that further the purpose of the organization and is responsible for managing the organization's business. The founding chair of the association is Arnold Schwarzenegger. The current president is Magnus Berntsson – president of the Regional Council of Västra Götaland and president of the AER (Assembly of European Regions) and The Strategic Advisor to the Founding Chair is Terry Tamminen, CEO of the Leonardo DiCaprio Foundation and the former secretary of the California Environmental Protection Agency.

The R20 executive director is Dr. Christophe Nuttall, former director of the Hub for Innovative Partnerships at the United Nations Development Programme (UNDP).

=== R20 Foundation ===
The R20 Foundation is the entity responsible for almost all aspects of funding of the R20 Association and its operations. It was created at the request of a number of investors interested to invest in the R20 ecosystem of blended finance.

With a board of directors composed of green finance leaders, the R20 Foundation meets the demands of development banks, sovereign funds, private bans, private equities, family offices and pension funds. The current board is composed of Armand Jost, founder and CEO of SB3i (chairman), Dr. Patrick Scheurle, CEO of BlueOrchard Finance Ltd., Craig Cogut, chairman and president of Pegasus Capital Advisors, Dr. Andreas Mattner, chairman of the executive committee, «Lebendige Stadt» Foundation, Terry Tamminen, CEO of the Leonardo DiCaprio Foundation, Chrisophe Dossarps, CEO of the Sustainable Infrastructure Foundation and Dr. Frannie Léautier, founder and managing partner of Ezembat Group.

The headquarters of R20 is located in Geneva, Switzerland. This city hosts a unique concentration of international organizations, financial institutions, NGOs, and academic institutions—entities with which this NGO can collaborate to further its objectives.

To facilitate and bring together local authorities, technology providers and investors, R20 works with regional offices installed around the world: Austria (Vienna), France (Paris), US (Santa Monica), Algeria (Oran), and Brazil (Rio de Janeiro).

As of November 2016, R20 has 49 direct members (both national & sub-national authorities) and 134 businesses and project facilitators (academic institutions, national agencies, NGOs, private companies, UN programs and Intergovernmental organizations), and 41 investors and financial institutions.

== History ==
During his tenure as Governor of the State of California from 2003 to 2011, Arnold Schwarzenegger was responsible for signing into law groundbreaking legislation that translated the Kyoto Protocol into Californian law. This and other initiatives is what led President Obama to ask Governor Schwarzenegger to obtain similar commitments from thirty other US States.

A. Schwarzenegger's success in implementing action at the sub-national level, and his ability to demonstrate the potential to scale this impact by replication at the sub-national level is ultimately what gave birth to the R20 Regions of Climate Action.

In December 2009, after evaluating the failure of the COP15 to agree on the practical means to limit carbon emissions, Gov. Schwarzenegger, with the support from the UN Secretary General Ban Ki Moon, decided to create a new coalition of Regions committed to action. He met with a number of heads of regions, including Governor Uduaghan from Delta State, Nigeria, President Charet from the Province of Quebec, Canada, President Huchon and Vice President Michèle Sabban from Region Ile de France, and 17 other representatives from other Regions, who all decided to create R20 Regions of Climate Action.

In September 2010, Governor Schwarzenegger organized the Third Global Governors Climate Summit in Sacramento and launched the R20 Charter, which was signed by representatives of Regions, national governments, NGOs, foundations, private companies and finance institutions. In September 2011, the First constitutive General Assembly of R20 marked the official creation of the NGO. Linda Adam, The California Environmental Protection Agency State Secretary, was officially elected president of the R20 Board and Terry Tamminen was nominated as R20 special advisor to Governor Schwarzenegger, the honorary founding chair of R20.

In January 2012, Dr. Christophe Nuttall, director of the UNDP Hub for Innovative Partnership, officially joined R20 as executive director.

From 2013 to 2017, Michèle Sabban took on the R20 presidency.

In June 2017, Magnus Berntsson, president of the Regional Council of Västra Götaland and president of AER, was elected as the new R20 president.

Since 2017, R20 organises the annual climate conference Austrian World Summit in Vienna.

== See also ==
- Climate change
- Sustainable development
- Paris Agreement
