= Michèle Sabban =

French politician

Michèle Sabban (born 28 June 1954 in El Kef in Tunisia) is a French politician, especially committed to equality between men and women.

== Political life ==
- Member of the French Socialist Party since 1981
- Member of the National Council of the Socialist Party since 1983
- Technical Adviser for the Promotion of Women from 1997 to 2002
- National Secretary for Women's Rights in November 1997 to 2003
- First Secretary of the Federation of the Socialist Party of Val-de-Marne from 1997 to 2008
- Vice-President of the Regional Council of Île-de-France, in charge of General Administration and Personnel since 1998
- Vice-President of the Socialist International Women North and South Mediterranean section since 2003
- Member of the Congress of the Council of Europe since 2012
- President of the Assembly of European Regions (elected in November 2008, re-elected in November 2010)
- President of the R20 Regions of Climate Action (since January 2012).
- President of FMDV-Global Fund for Cities Development since 2014

== Personal life ==
In May 2011 she received extensive media coverage for her defence of Dominique Strauss-Kahn.
