= Albert Castellanos =

Catalan politician and economist

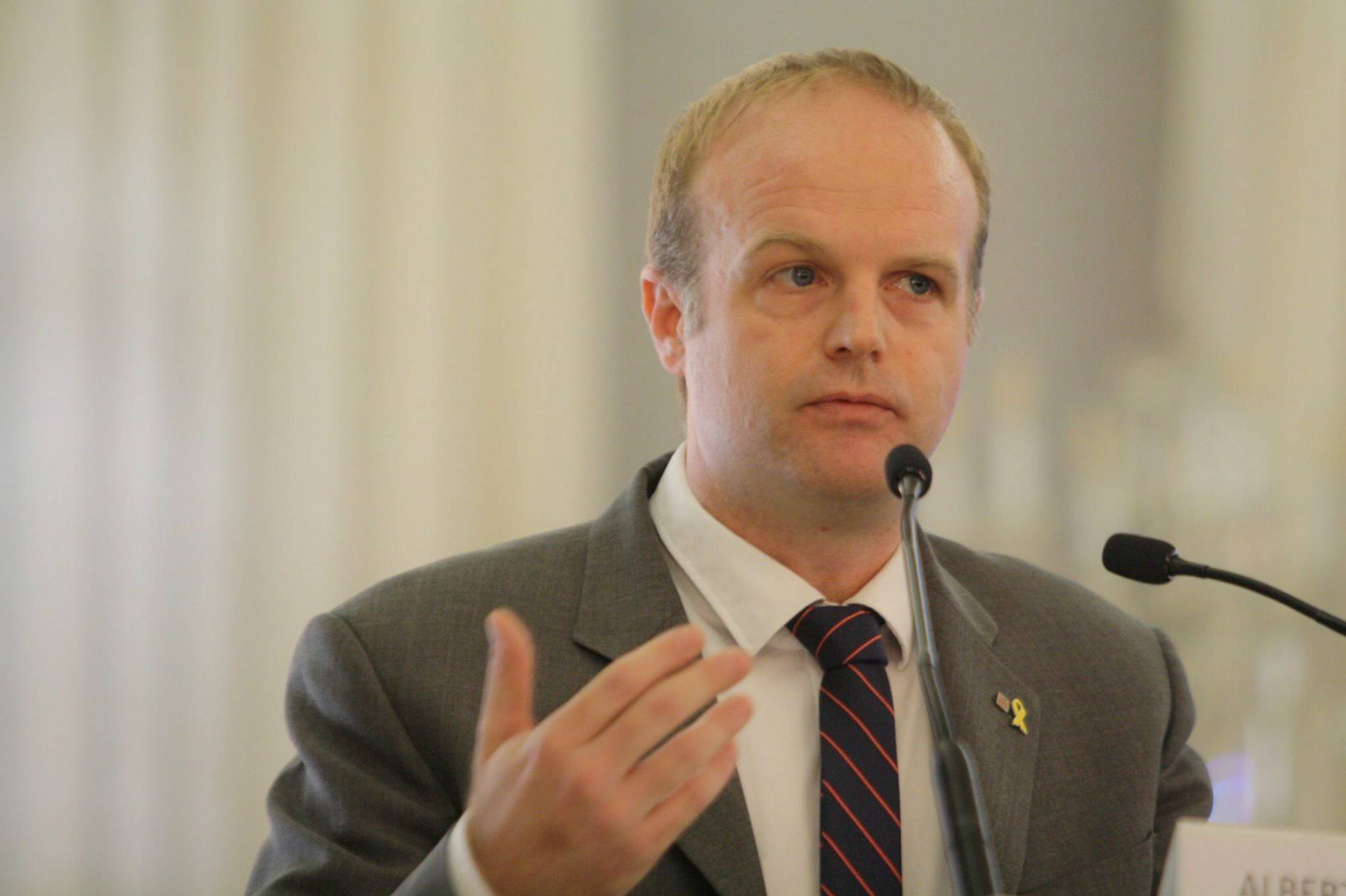
- Albert Castellanos in 2019
- Born: 1978 (age 47–48); Barcelona, Spain
- Occupations: politician, economist
- Known for: President of Assembly of European Regions (2023-2025)

Albert Castellanos (born in Barcelona in 1978) is a Catalan economist and politician, member of the Republican Left of Catalonia. He is President of the Assembly of European Regions since June 2023. He is also secretary of business and competitiveness of the Catalan Government since 2021, and CEO of Catalonia Trade & Investment since 2022.

With a degree in economics from the Pompeu Fabra University (UPF), he continued his studies with a master's in public economics at the University of York, and a master's in management at the Public Administration School of Catalonia. Between 2006 and 2009 he was executive secretary of the Catalan Agency for Business Competitiveness (Catalonia Trade & Investment).

He later worked at the university and Research Grants Management Agency (AGAUR) as executive director, also as an associate professor at the Pompeu Fabra University and as a manager at the University of Barcelona.

In 2016 he was appointed director general of economic promotion, competition and regulation in the Catalan Government, with Oriol Junqueras as councillor, and in 2017 secretary of the Treasury. Between 2018 and 2021 he was the right hand of Pere Aragonès in the vice presidency and economy and finance, where he was general secretary.

After the 2021 Catalan elections, in June 2021 he was appointed secretary of business and competitiveness of the Department of Business and Labor of the Government of Catalonia.

In November 2022, he was appointed CEO of Catalonia Trade & Investment, a position that combines with his position as secretary of business and competitiveness.

On June 30, 2023, he was appointed president of the Assembly of European Regions, replacing Magnus Berntsson (Sweden), who held the position since 2017.
