= Jungle tourism =

Tourism around the jungles of the world

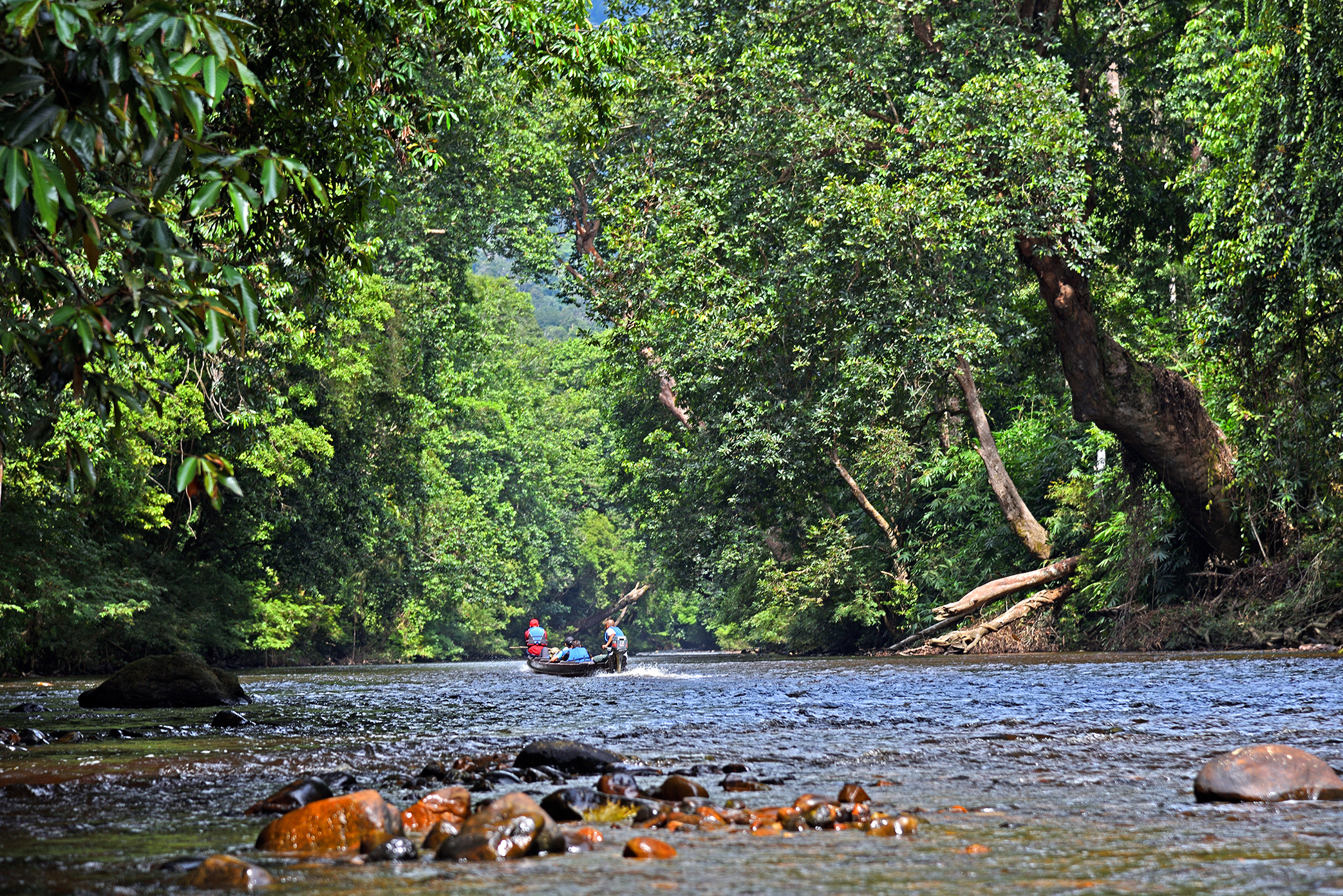
Tourists kayaking in Taman Negara, Malaysia.

Jungle tourism is a subcategory of adventure travel defined by active multifaceted physical means of travel in the jungle regions of the Earth. Although similar in many respects to adventure travel, jungle tourism pertains specifically to the context of region, culture and activity. According to the Glossary of Tourism Terms, jungle tours have become a major component of green tourism in tropical destinations and are a relatively recent phenomenon of Western international tourism.

Of the regions that take part in tourism-driven sustainable development practices and eco tourism, Mexican, Central and South American practices are the most pervasive in the industry; notably Mayan jungle excursions. Other regions include jungle territories in Africa, Australia, and the South Pacific.

== Central and South America ==
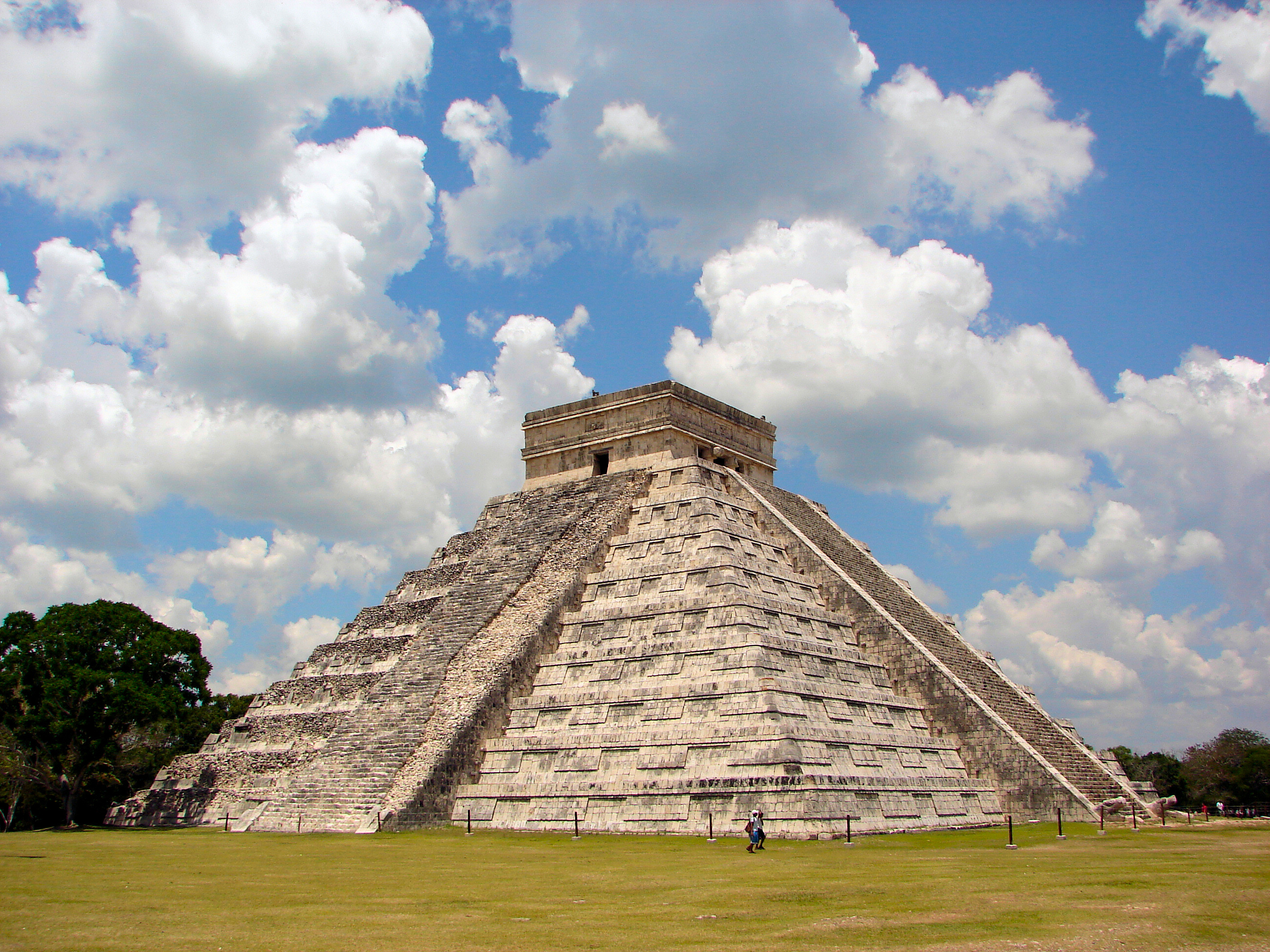
Chichen Itza in Mexico, a World Heritage Site

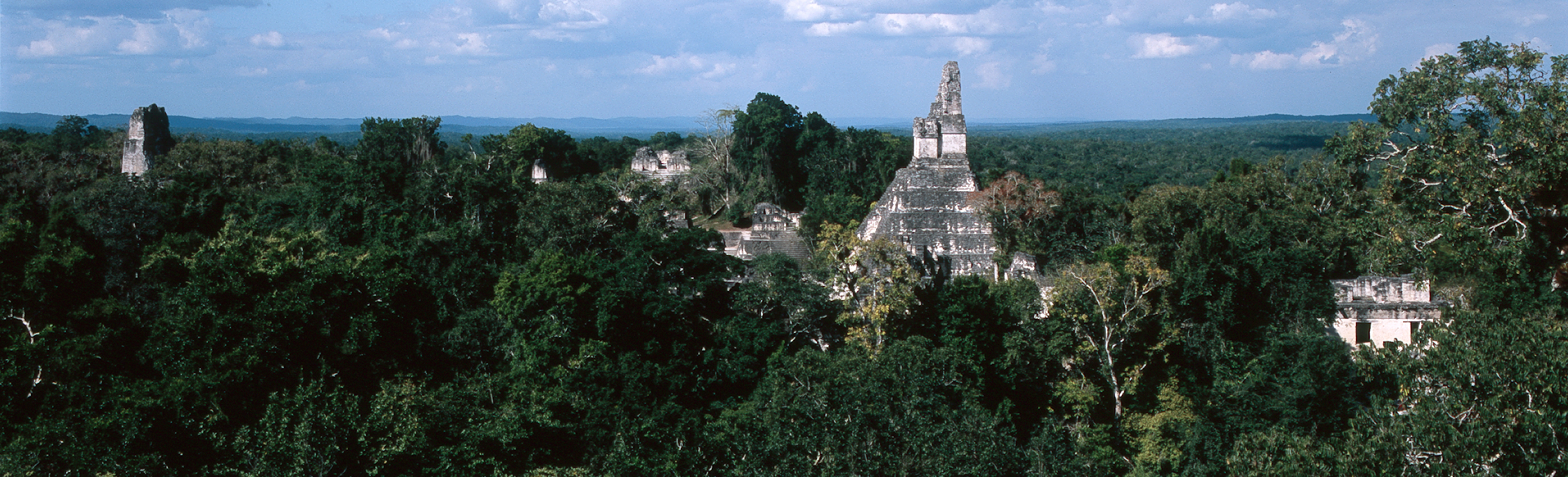
The Tikal in Guatemala

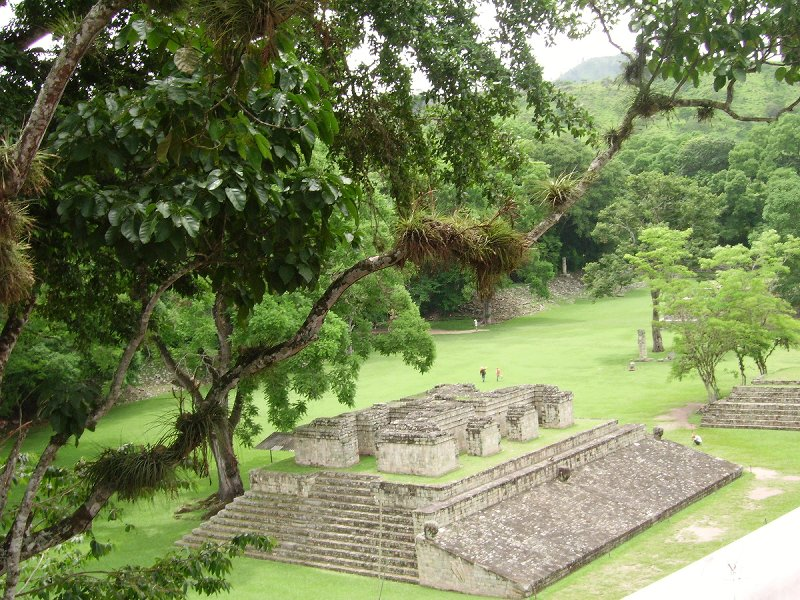
Copán in Honduras

The majority of jungle tour operators are concentrated in what is known as the Mayan World or "Ruta Maya". The Mayan World encompasses five countries that hosted the entirety of the Mayan Civilization: Mexico, Guatemala, Belize, Honduras and El Salvador. Most tours consist of visits to popular Mayan archaeological sites such as Tikal, Guatemala, Chichen Itza, and Copan. These day visits will usually consist of a guided tour of a heavily tourist-concentrated Mayan and archaeological site. Tikal and Chichen Itza are prime examples of popular day-visit sites. Such sites involve a tour guide, designated either by the state government or by a private company, for the tourists. These tour guides are predominantly trained professionals, certified to take large parties of fifty through heavily populated archaeological sites. Nicaragua and Costa Rica are also popular destinations for this type of adventure travel.

Although most of the visits to these more prominent sites involve day trips, there are also many jungle tour operators that showcase less-known, remote Mayan jungle ruins such as Nakum, Yaxha, and El Mirador. These tours involve much more preparation, time and funding to explore as they are usually in very remote and generally inaccessible regions of the Mayan jungles. These ruins and sites are reached by alternative and physically taxing means of travel such as bicycle, canoe, horseback or hiking. This is what essentially differentiates jungle tourism from any other sort of adventure travel tours. There are several tour operators that will employ the use of machetes during tours.

Another difference is that the majority of tour operators that travel deep into the Central and South American jungle will cap the number of persons traveling in the group at ten to fifteen. This is done to minimize the impact on the jungle flora and fauna. Federal laws in some countries prohibit any given group larger than fifteen people traveling through the Mayan jungle, a generally protected region, but limited resources for enforcing such laws have allowed such practices to occur under the radar.

In Guatemala it has become very popular to hike through the jungle of the Mayan Biosphere due to the discovery of El Mirador, also known as the Lost City of Maya. There are no roads. Many take a quick flight from Flores while others hike through the jungles of the department of Petén. Groups should be smaller than 15 people in order to reduce the impact on the environment.

== See also ==
- Ecotourism
