= Indian Autorickshaw Challenge =

The Indian Autorickshaw Challenge (also known as Rickshaw Challenge) is an international autorickshaw rally. The entrants use the autorickshaw or tuk-tuk, a common vehicle of India's urban east, to cross large portions of the Indian sub-continent over a period several of days. The simple construction of the autorickshaw and the diversity of the landscape requires the participants to be resourceful and determined in order to finish the course. The event is organised by Chennai Event Management Services.

The Rickshaw Challenge consists of four events; the two with the most participants are the Classic Run and the Mumbai Xpress. The events are not competitions, but instead provide adventure, test the entrant’s endurance and perseverance, and allow them to contribute to humanitarian projects.

== History ==
The Indian Autorickshaw Challenge was started by the Travel Scientists, a motorsports adventure tourism operator. The first rally was held in 2006.

== The Classic Run ==
This is the shorter and lower impact of the two events, spanning roughly 1000 kilometres, across 12 districts and one union territory. The daily stretches can be up to 200 kilometres long, and can be strewn with significant natural and human obstacles, ranging from densely packed urban sprawl to monsoon rains to uncooperative cows on the roadways.

The route is within the southern Indian province of Tamil Nadu, and extends down the southern coast of India between the start lines in Besant Nagar Beach, Chennai to the chequered flag in Kanniyakumari at the sub-continent's southern tip.

The championship itself is composed of a series of activities along the route designed to challenge physical and mental agility, with points being awarded for their completion in addition to completing that day's particular route.

Both the Classic Rally and the Mumbai Xpress Rally are associated with Round Table India. Participants of these events are encouraged to raise funds towards charitable efforts in Tamil Nadu and across India.

== The Mumbai Xpress ==
The Mumbai Xpress is an annual motorsport event that leaves from Chennai, wherein competitors drive auto rickshaws across the Indian sub-continent to Mumbai. The first event took place in 2007 and the 10th annual Mumbai Xpress started on 5 August 2017. The autorickshaw rally lasts two weeks and travels over 1900 kilometres (roughly 1200 miles). This race began out of a demand for more varied routes following the original Classic Run, hosted by the same parent company. The international event has drawn participants from more than 10 countries, including the United States, Spain, Russia, Germany, Mexico, South Korea, France, New Zealand, Australia, and Norway.

== Additional autorickshaw rallies ==
=== Tech Raid ===
The Rickshaw Challenge also includes the Tech Raid, an autorickshaw tour that starts in Chennai and ends in Hyderabad as well as the Malabar Rampage, which starts and ends in Chennai.

== Other Travel Scientists events ==
Travel Scientists, a motorsports adventure tourism operator, was founded in 2006 by Aravind Bremanandam in Chennai, India. They held the first rally in 2006. In 2007, while on an adventure rally in Bamako, Mali, the company's founder met Attila Berenyi, an adventure traveller from Hungary, and they had decided to bring minimal assistance motor vehicle adventure tourism to Europe.

=== European rallies ===
The first European event was the Caucasian Rally that started from Budapest on 30 August 2008, from Memento Park and went through Croatia, Bosnia-Herzegovina, Montenegro, Kosovo, Albania, Macedonia, Bulgaria, Turkey, and Kurdistan, before finishing in Yerevan, Armenia, on 15 September. Travel Scientists has organized a number of rallies since then, holding from one to three rallies each year across India, Europe, and Russia. The Azerbaijani Embassy in Hungary had received a notice from Azerbaijan because of the company holding "tours to the occupied territories of Azerbaijan arranged by The Travel Scientists, of which the headquarters are located in Budapest as part of the Caucasian Challenge," according to the spokesman for the Azerbaijani Foreign Ministry, Hikmet Hajiyev, in 2014.

=== Central Asia Rally ===
Also organized by the Travel Scientists, the Central Asia Rally is a road rally in which participants drive vehicles overland from Budapest, Hungary to Dushanbe, Tajikistan, winding through Ukraine, Russia, Kazakhstan, Uzbekistan, following the path of Marco Polo, the Silk Way and the Pamir Highway. It is not a race, but instead a self-guided tour of the rugged terrain and local culture. The course is about 8,000 kilometres long and takes 18 days to complete.

Members of Travel Scientists planned and traveled the route in 2011, and in May, 2012, the first rally took place. Instead of crossing Ukraine as planned, the teams went round the Black Sea from south. A few participants missed the start and several gave up along the way, but about a dozen teams completed the course and arrived at the final destination, Dushanbe, the capital of Tajikistan.

In 2012 the race went through Hungary, Romania, Bulgaria, Turkey, Georgia, North Ossetia-Alania, Ingushetia, Chechnya, Dagestan, Kalmykia, Russia, Kazakhstan, Uzbekistan and Tajikistan. As part of the rally, an in-kind donation was made to the handicapped people of Murghab and Rang Kul in the eastern Pamirs (Tajikistan, near the Chinese border). ACTED, a French non-governmental organization settled in Murghab helped to distribute three dozen wheelchairs delivered from Budapest.

In 2013 the participants followed the original itinerary set up on the 2011 mapping trip, from Hungary to Russia, through Ukraine, and the unaltered track further on. After the Caspian Sea, the Kazakh steppe, the Aral Sea, the Kyzyl Kum Desert, the towns of Khiva, Bukhara and Samarkand, the Pamirs and the Pamir Highway, returning to Dushanbe along the Afghan border in the Wakhan Corridor.

== Charity efforts ==
Indian Autorickshaw Challenge is associated with Round Table India in order to raise awareness of and funds for higher education projects for children of India. Participants of the Mumbai Xpress are encouraged to raise funds prior to participating in the event.
