= Terry Tamminen =

Energy and environmental policy author and advisor

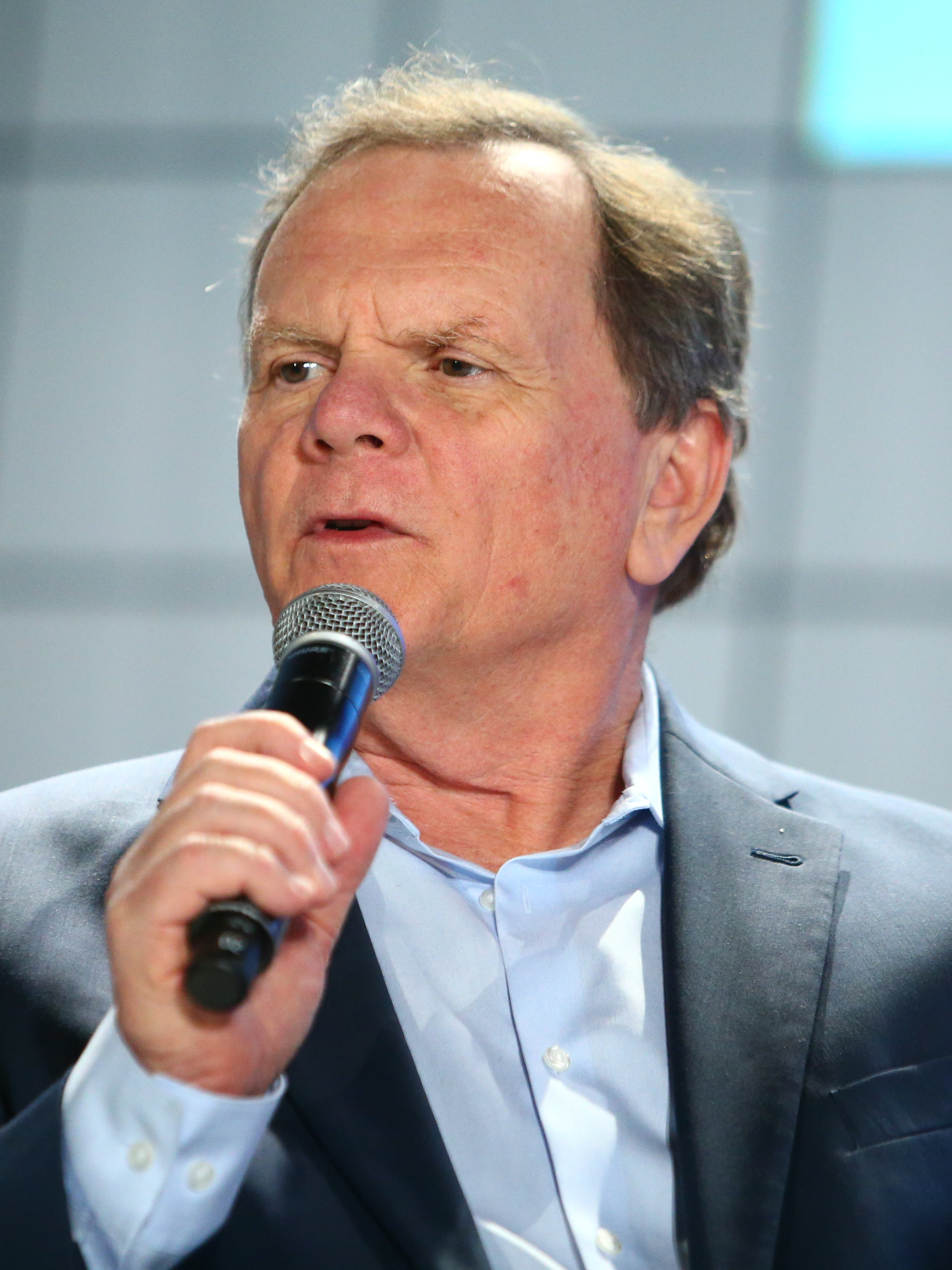
- Tamminen in 2019
- Born: March 7, 1952 (age 74); Milwaukee, Wisconsin
- Occupations: CEO of AltaSea at the Port of Los Angeles; CEO of 7th Generation Advisors
- Known for: Former Secretary of the California Environmental Protection Agency
- Political party: Democratic Party
- Website: 7thgenerationadvisors.org/terry-tamminen

Terrance Arthur Tamminen (born March 7, 1952) is an author, lecturer, and strategist on energy and the environment. In 2003, California Governor Arnold Schwarzenegger appointed him as Secretary of the California Environmental Protection Agency. In December 2004, he was appointed Cabinet Secretary, the Chief Policy Advisor to the Governor. He continues to advise the former governor, and other regional, national, and international leaders, on energy and environmental policy.

== Early life and early career ==
Tamminen was born in Milwaukee, Wisconsin, but spent most of his youth in Australia. In the 1960s he helped run a family-run tropical fish breeding business in Australia. He continued to focus on oceans with studies on conch depletion in the Bahamas, manatee populations in Florida coastal waters, and mariculture in the Gulf States with Texas A&M University.

Tamminen is a United States Coast Guard-licensed ship captain. He is also an airplane and helicopter pilot and speaks German, Dutch and Spanish.

== Non-profit work ==
In 1993, Tamminen founded the Santa Monica Baykeeper and served as its executive director for six years. He co-founded Waterkeeper programs in San Diego, Orange County, Ventura, and Santa Barbara. He also served for five years as executive director of the Environment Now Foundation in Santa Monica, CA and co-founded the Frank G. Wells Environmental Law Clinic at the School of Law, University of California Los Angeles. In April, 2007, he was named the Cullman Senior Fellow and Director of the Climate Policy Program of The New America Foundation, a non-profit, post-partisan, public policy institute. In February 2007, Tamminen founded the non-profit 7th Generation Advisors, where he currently serves as president. In 2011, Terry helped former Governor Arnold Schwarzenegger found the R20 Regions of Climate Action and was appointed as the Strategic Advisor to the Founding Chair. As the Founding Chair's Strategic Advisor, he advises the R20 on policy and helps with the design and implementation of climate resilient economic development projects. In 2016, Terry was named CEO of the Leonardo DiCaprio Foundation, where he oversaw operations, the implementation of a new comprehensive climate change action plan, and numerous global environmental and climate change initiatives. In January 2022, Terry was appointed President/CEO of AltaSea in the Port of Los Angeles.

== Author ==
Tamminen co-authored Climate Finance: A Status Report and Action Plan, released at COP21 in December 2015. Tamminen's latest book, Watercolors: How JJ the Whale Saved Us, shares his true story of the rescue of JJ, a one-day-old gray whale that was found abandoned in Marina del Rey, California. Tamminen's previous book, Cracking the Carbon Code: The Key to Sustainable Profits in the New Economy (Palgrave), shows how to find the low carbon products and services that save money, get ahead of regulations, and preserve resources for generations to come. Tamminen's former book, Lives Per Gallon: The True Cost of Our Oil Addiction (Island Press), examines human dependence on oil and a strategy to evolve to more sustainable energy sources. He has also authored a series of best-selling “Ultimate Guides” to pools and spas (McGraw-Hill): The Ultimate Pool Maintenance Manual, The Ultimate Guide to Above-Ground Pools, and The Ultimate Guide to Spas and Hot Tubs. In addition, he has written several theatrical works on the life of William Shakespeare and "The Lost Letters of William Shakespeare: The Undiscovered Diary of his Strange Eventful Life and Lives" (Shakespeare House Press 2018) The Lost Letters of William Shakespeare

Tamminen blogged regularly for CNBC, Fast Company, HuffPost and Mother Nature Network.

== California Environmental Protection Agency ==
In November 2003, Terry Tamminen was appointed Secretary of the California Environmental Protection Agency. In April, 2004, the California Hydrogen Highway Network was initiated by Governor Schwarzenegger's Executive Order S-07-04.

In November 2004, Tamminen was appointed Cabinet Secretary. Tamminen left the administration in August 2006. In September 2006, California signed into law the Global Warming Solutions Act or Assembly Bill (AB) 32.

== Private Sector Work ==
In September 2007, Tamminen was appointed as an Operating Advisor to Pegasus Capital Advisors. He currently serves as a senior advisor to Angeleno Group, a private equity and venture capital firm focused on sustainable energy investments.

== Recognition ==
- 2007:
  - Vanity Fair’s May 2007 Environmental Hero
  - Featured in the “51 Things We Can Do” section in TIME Magazine’s Earthday edition
- 2008: Ranked No. 1 in “Top 50 People Who Can Save the Planet by The Guardian
- 2009: Named an “Eco Baron” in Pulitzer Prize-winning journalist Edward Humes book, Eco Barons: The Dreamers, Schemers, and Millionaires Who Are Saving Our Planet
- 2011: One of six finalists for the 2011 Zayed Future Energy Prize
- 2019: Keynote Speaker at Verdical Group's annual Net Zero Conference
