= Hande Özsan Bozatlı =

Turkish politician

Dr Hande Özsan Bozatlı (Born 1960 in Kastamonu, Turkey), is a dermatologist and former President of the Assembly of European Regions. In 2009 she became Vice-President of Istanbul Special Provincial Council and a President of the EU and International Relations Committee. At the same time, she became a member of the Congress of Local and Regional Authorities of the Council of Europe. Hande Özsan Bozatlı has been active as member at the Assembly of European Regions since 2009. This led to her election as President of the AER Committee on Culture, Education, Youth and International Cooperation in 2010 (Committee 3). In May 2013, she was elected President of the Assembly of European Regions. She was re-elected in December 2015.

== Medical career ==
Her dermatology residency training took place from 1988 to 1991 at the Dermatology Department of Ondokuz Mayis University Medical School Hospital in Samsun, another city in the Black Sea Region. From 1991 to 1994, she dealt with training and regulatory issues for Turkish and French Pharmaceutical companies.

Dr. Bozatlı started her own private clinic in Istanbul in 1994. She has specialized in cosmetic dermatology and works with both domestic and international patients. She has various publications and lectures in national and international Dermatology Meetings. She is a member of the American Academy of Cosmetic Surgery.

== Turkish Political Engagements – Istanbul politician ==
As a representative for Justice and Development Party, Bozatlı was elected to serve as a Provincial Council member in Istanbul in 2009 and became Vice President. She was the president of the EU and International Relation Committee of the Provincial Council until April 2014.

== European Political Responsibilities - President of the Assembly of European Regions ==
She' was elected in 2010 as the President of the Assembly of European Region's Committee on Culture, Education, Youth and International Cooperation. She has been very much involved with Youth Councils, and all kind of youth issues in Europe, including unemployment and early school-drop out problems.

In May 2013, she was elected President of the Assembly of European Regions and re-elected unanimously in December 2015. She was the first AER President coming from a non EU member country and one of the rare non EU member and Turkish personality heading a European political organization.
