= Ecotourism routes in Europe =

The five Ecotourism Pan-European routes
- Website type: Travel guides
- Website: In construction
- Launched: 2013

There are five ecotourism pan-European routes crossing 35 countries in Europe that connect natural parks (national parks and regional parks) to either selected UNESCO heritage sites or biosphere reserves.

== History ==
=== 1990s ===
In 1995, the European Federation of the Mountain (EFM) had a consultant represent EFM's concern with the rural development of its territories at an Organisation for Economic Cooperation and Development (OECD) workshop to research "niche markets and rural development." Twenty country members of the OECD and the Council of Europe were represented to discuss the proposals from three experts from the private sector and five consultants from the Expert Committee Initiative Leader Europe. The OECD No. 48256 1995 published the summary of this workshop. In Chapter 5, Pierre Guerry, a consultant of the Federation, presents two new axes for rural areas: Quality Certification and Designations of Origin. The consultant proposed to create a European network of cultural heritage to develop a sustainable rural economy.

In 1998, the Ecological Science division of UNESCO offered 120 accredited Man and the Biosphere Programme (MAB) and 250 national parks in Europe. The MAB and natural parks are interconnected to form the network of ecotourism pan-European routes.

=== 2000s to current ===
The consultant asked the PhD students of the Alpine Geography Institute of Grenoble to establish the first map of this network, called the "European Touring Nature Map". The direction of this UNESCO Division gave written permission to the consultant to affix its logo to the European map. The first test was executed in the Aosta Valley, Italy, with the European Regional Development Fund (ERDF) DG XVI in 2000. The European foldable map in four languages was published in 1,000 copies. On the back of the map, 51 local professionals were presented to facilitate the traveller's visits.

The tourism expert of the United Nations Environment Programme (UNEP), after several hearings, responded favorably to the ten questions of the private initiative.

In 2005, a second test was executed in the region of Lake Tisza, Hungary. The jury was with the Swedish president of the group "Rural Economy and Sustainable Tourism" from the Assembly of European Regions, an NGO with a membership of 270 regions in Europe. Four counties, 73 villages and 150 local professionals signed the project charter. Some 5,000 maps in two languages were published. These maps had the first layout of the five European routes: Atlantic, Mediterranean, Nordic, Central and Western routes. The map was approved by the rural tourism group of the Assembly of European Regions.

The Minister of Planning and Hungarian Tourism gave a press conference from the print and two television channels on this as "an example to follow for all the regional territories in Europe wishing to promote their specificities".

In 2007, the Assembly of European Regions presented the project to the European Union to enable the local authorities to co-finance the project. The project could not continue to be financed from the European fund; the consultant, who is also the project initiative, chose to fund its own development.

In 2010, the NPS signed contracts with 630 private companies, mainly SMEs for local products, accommodations and sports activities.

In 2013, the ecotourism pan-European routes finalized the layout of the five routes across 36 countries, 230 regions, 154 stages and 180 sub-steps.

== Routes ==
=== The Mediterranean route (about 8,000 km) ===
This route crosses 10 countries.

- Portugal: 1 stage, 1 region
- Spain: 6 stages, 12 sub-steps, 3 regions, 8 natural parks, 12 UNESCO sites, 3 pilgrimage sites
- Andorra: 1 stage, 1 UNESCO site
- France: 4 stages, 15 sub-steps, 3 regions, 9 natural parks, 8 UNESCO sites, 6 pilgrimage sites
- Italy: 9 stages, 16 sub-steps, 12 regions, 21 natural parks, 22 UNESCO sites, 6 pilgrimage sites
- Croatia: 1 stage, 5 sub-steps, 4 regions, 5 natural parks, 6 UNESCO sites
- Bosnia and Herzegovina: 1 stage, 1 sub-step, 1 region, 1 natural park, 1 UNESCO site, 2 pilgrimage sites
- Montenegro: 1 stage, 1 sub-step, 1 region, 2 natural parks, 1 UNESCO site
- Albania: 2 stages, 6 sub-steps, 6 regions, 1 natural park, 2 UNESCO sites
- Greece: 1 stage, 5 sub-steps, 3 regions, 5 natural parks, 4 UNESCO sites

=== The Atlantic route (about 8,300 km) ===
This route crosses five countries.

- Portugal: 3 stages, 11 sub-steps, 3 regions, 5 natural parks, 7 UNESCO sites, 1 pilgrimage site
- Spain: 3 stages, 13 sub-steps, 4 regions, 8 natural parks, 4 UNESCO sites, 3 pilgrimage sites
- France: 11 stages, 34 sub-steps, 7 regions, 12 natural parks, 4 UNESCO sites, 10 pilgrimage sites
- United Kingdom: 9 stages, 28 sub-steps, 17 regions, 16 natural parks, 14 UNESCO sites, 1 pilgrimage site
- Ireland: 3 stages, 13 sub-steps, 3 regions, 4 natural parks, 1 UNESCO site, 1 pilgrimage site

=== The Nordic route (about 11,500 km) ===
This route crosses 13 countries.

- France: 6 stages, 20 sub-steps, 4 regions, 9 natural parks, 7 UNESCO sites, 5 pilgrimage sites
- Belgium: 1 stage, 5 sub-steps, 3 regions, 1 natural park, 8 UNESCO sites, 1 pilgrimage site
- Netherlands: 3 stages, 13 sub-steps, 8 regions, 9 natural parks, 6 UNESCO sites, 1 pilgrimage site
- Germany: 3 stages, 9 sub-steps, 3 regions, 7 natural parks, 3 UNESCO sites, 1 pilgrimage site
- Denmark: 1 stage, 1 sub-step, 1 region, 1 UNESCO site
- Sweden: 4 stages, 10 sub-steps, 4 regions, 6 natural parks, 4 UNESCO sites
- Norway: 6 stages, 8 sub-steps, 4 regions, 8 natural parks, 4 UNESCO sites, 1 pilgrimage site
- Finland: 7 stages, 14 sub-steps, 7 regions, 14 natural parks, 4 UNESCO sites
- Estonia: 2 stages, 5 sub-steps, 6 regions, 3 natural parks, 1 UNESCO site
- Latvia: 1 stage, 6 sub-steps, 2 regions, 2 natural parks, 1 UNESCO site
- Lithuania: 1 stage, 4 sub-steps, 2 regions, 5 natural parks, 1 pilgrimage site
- Russia: 1 stage
- Poland: 3 stages, 6 sub-steps, 1 region, 1 natural park, 2 UNESCO sites, 1 pilgrimage site

=== The Occidental route (about 10,400 km) ===
This route crosses 14 countries.

- France: 5 stages, 22 sub-steps, 2 regions, 10 natural parks, 2 UNESCO sites, 8 pilgrimage sites
- Italy: 3 stages, 7 sub-steps, 3 regions, 8 natural parks, 3 UNESCO sites, 5 pilgrimage sites
- Switzerland: 1 stage, 7 sub-steps, 8 regions, 1 natural park, 2 UNESCO sites, 2 pilgrimage sites
- Germany: 1 stage, 4 sub-steps, 1 region, 1 natural park, 1 UNESCO site, 3 pilgrimage sites
- Austria: 3 stages, 7 sub-steps, 3 regions, 2 natural parks, 5 UNESCO sites, 3 pilgrimage sites
- Czech Republic: 1 stage, 5 sub-steps, 5 regions, 1 natural park, 6 UNESCO sites, 1 pilgrimage site
- Poland: 2 stages, 2 sub-steps, 2 regions, 3 natural parks, 2 UNESCO sites, 1 pilgrimage site
- Slovakia: 1 stage, 2 sub-steps, 2 regions, 1 natural park, 2 UNESCO sites
- Ukraine: 1 stage, 1 sub-step, 1 region, 1 natural park
- Hungary: 2 stages, 5 sub-steps, 5 regions, 5 natural parks, 3 UNESCO sites, 2 pilgrimage sites
- Romania: 5 stages, 10 sub-steps, 4 regions, 11 natural parks, 4 UNESCO sites
- Serbia: 3 stages, 7 sub-steps, 1 region, 2 natural parks, 1 UNESCO site
- Bulgaria: 5 stages, 10 sub-steps, 13 regions, 2 natural parks, 5 UNESCO sites, 1 pilgrimage site
- Turkey: 2 stages, 3 sub-steps, 1 region, 1 UNESCO site, 1 pilgrimage site

=== The Central route (about 7,200 km) ===
The Central route ends in Moscow. This route crosses eight countries.

- France: 6 stages, 18 sub-steps, 4 regions, 7 natural parks, 4 UNESCO sites, 11 pilgrimage sites
- Luxembourg: 4 sub-steps, 3 regions, 1 natural park, 1 UNESCO site, 1 pilgrimage site
- Germany: 5 stages, 13 sub-steps, 6 regions, 3 natural parks, 14 UNESCO sites, 1 pilgrimage site
- Czech Republic: 1 stage, 2 sub-steps, 2 regions, 2 natural parks, 1 UNESCO site
- Poland: 4 stages, 8 sub-steps, 5 regions, 7 natural parks, 5 UNESCO sites, 2 pilgrimage sites
- Lithuania: 1 stage, 3 sub-steps, 3 regions, 2 natural parks, 2 UNESCO sites, 1 pilgrimage site
- Belarus: 2 stages, 1 sub-step, 2 regions
- Russia: 5 stages, 7 sub-steps, 1 region, 2 natural parks, 7 UNESCO sites

== Consultation ==
International organisations were consulted:

- The Ecological Sciences division of MAB at UNESCO proposed a selection of sites based on their landscapes or their architecture.
- The Assembly of European Regions, an NGO, contributed to the plan and to the charter, which were tested in four counties of Hungary.
- Workshops held by the OECD (Organization for Economic Cooperation and Development) let 130 countries exchange ideas for rural development.

== See also ==
- Convention on Biological Diversity
- Ecological indicator
- European Cultural Route
- Rural tourism
