= Catalonia Trade & Investment =

Catalan Government agency

- ACCIÓ

Agency overview
- Formed: 2008; 18 years ago
- Jurisdiction: Catalonia, Spain
- Headquarters: Passeig de Gràcia, 129 Barcelona,Catalonia; 41°23′51.1″N 2°09′27.5″E
- Agency executive: Chief Executive Officer, Albert Castellanos
- Website: Official

Catalonia Trade & Investment (Catalan: Agència per a la Competitivitat de l'Empresa, ACCIÓ) is the Catalan Government’s agency that promotes foreign investment and business competitiveness. Headquartered in Barcelona, it currently operates globally through a network of 40 offices all over the world.

According to the latest data available, in 2021 Catalonia Trade & Investment attracted 82 foreign investment projects (up 50% over the previous year), which amounted to 612 million euros (+27%) and enabled the creation of 3,122 jobs (+37%) in Catalonia.

The Financial Times’ fDi Magazine recognized 2018 as the agency's foreign investment strategy from among 112 candidates from all over the world. The same publication has picked Catalonia as Southern Europe’s best region for foreign investment in 2020-2021, being the third time in a row that this biannual ranking has placed Catalonia in this position.

== Mission ==
Catalonia Trade & Investment’s mission is to attract foreign investment to Catalonia. It provides support, insight and advice to international companies interested in relocating or expanding their businesses in Catalonia and Barcelona.

In addition, the agency promotes innovation, internationalisation, trade and funding of Catalan companies and startups.

== History ==
Founded in 2008 as a result of merging the public office Commercial Promotion Consortium of Catalonia (Catalan: Consorci de Promoció Comercial de Catalunya, COPCA) and the Innovation and Business Development Center (Catalan: Centre d'Innovació i Desenvolupament Empresarial, CIDEM).

The first foreign office of COPCA and CIDEM was established in Tokyo in 1988. During the same period the first American office in New York was established. In 1989 two offices were opened in Europe (London and Paris) and one in North Africa (Casablanca). In 1992 the first Middle East office in Dubai was opened.

Since COPCA and CIDEM merged and became Catalonia Trade & Investment, the number of exterior offices has grown to the current 40. In fact, the latest offices were opened in 2017 in Amsterdam, Nairobi, Tehran and Zagreb-Belgrade. The agency covers 100 markets in the five continents.

== Structure ==
Catalonia Trade & Investment is part of the Catalan Ministry of Business and Knowledge. Its current CEO is Joan Romero, appointed in June 2017. The agency has several departments including Innovation, Internationalization, Investment and Finance, among others.

List of departments:

- Innovation
- Investment and Foreign Companies
- Funding
- Clusters
- Internal Management and Resources
- Strategy and Competitive Intelligence
- Foreign Offices

== Investment attraction strategy ==
Catalonia Trade & Investment carries out a proactive investment attraction strategy with a priority on main investor countries (traditional and emerging), leading global companies, and strategic, pull and greenfield projects.

In terms of the value chain, priority is given to industrial projects, R&D centers and tech hubs, headquarters and logistics centers.

The attraction strategy highlights sectors of the future in which Catalonia is well positioned: Industry 4.0, life sciences, chemicals, food, logistics and e-commerce, textile, fashion and design.

Catalonia Trade & Investment works during the entire foreign investment attraction process: promoting Catalonia as an investment destination, providing comprehensive investment project management until effective implementation, and providing aftercare for new companies.

== Services ==
Catalonia Trade & Investment supports international companies interested in investing in Catalonia and Barcelona. It provides a fast-track service to facilitate all the investment phases:

1. Tailor-made information and comparative data for initial decisions
2. Adoption of a clear timetable and follow up process.
3. Strategic facilitators to speed up administrative procedures.
4. Initial check with specialized consultants where needed.
5. Appointment of a project manager for each investment.
6. Cost estimates of inputs, services, sites, construction, hiring, utilities.
7. Search for partners, competitive suppliers and service companies.
8. Support for recruiting plans.
9. Opening, inauguration and media coverage when needed.
10. Specialized services of location, financing, and visas fast-track.
