= Indigenous territory =

An indigenous territory is an area of land set aside for the use of indigenous peoples in a country that is largely populated by colonists from another region, typically Europe. The term may refer to

- Indigenous territory (Brazil) (Portuguese: Terra indígena)
- Indigenous territory (Bolivia) (Spanish: Territorio indígena originario campesinos)
- Indigenous territory (Colombia) (Spanish: Territorio indígena)
- Indigenous territory (Costa Rica) (Spanish: Territorio indígena)
- Indigenous and community conserved area, a concept defined by the IUCN

== See also ==
- Autonomous administrative division, generally for indigenous peoples
  - Autonomous administrative divisions of China
  - Autonomous administrative divisions of India
- Indigenous Protected Area, area defined under a system of land management whereby traditional owners manage flora and fauna in protected areas of Australia
- Lands inhabited by Indigenous peoples
