= Assembly of European Regions =

European organization

- Coat of arms

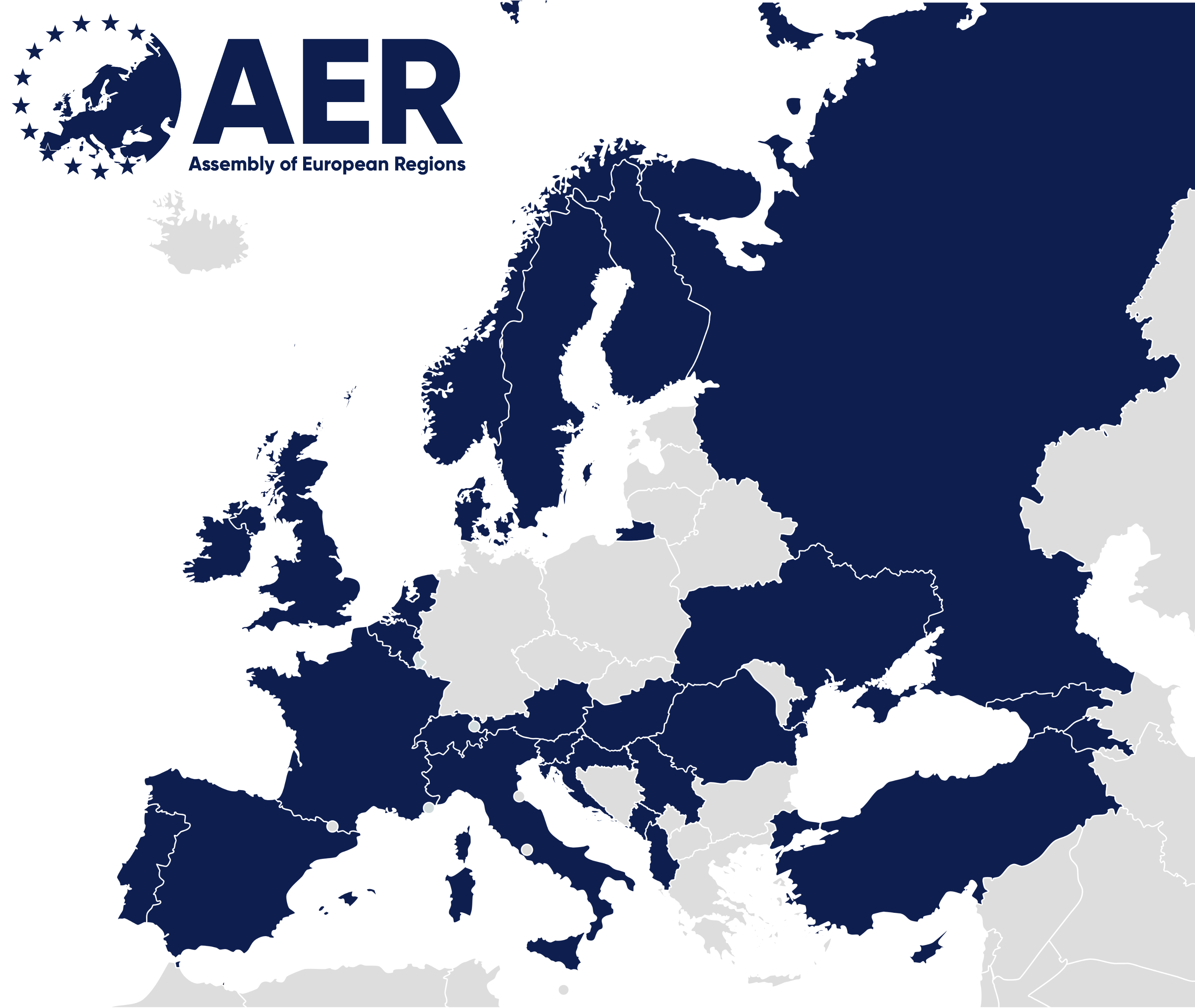
- Secretariat: Strasbourg and Brussels
- Official working language: English
- Type: Association
- Member regions: Members: Albania; Austria; Armenia; Belgium; Bosnia and Herzegovina; Croatia; Cyprus; France; Georgia; Ireland; Italy; Montenegro; Netherlands; Norway; Portugal; Romania; Serbia; Slovakia; Slovenia; Spain; Sweden; Switzerland; Turkey; Ukraine; United Kingdom

Leaders
  - President: Lukas Mandl
  - Secretary General: Christian Spahr
- Website aer.eu

The Assembly of European Regions (AER) is the largest independent networking organization of regions in wider Europe. Bringing together regions from 25 countries and 15 interregional organizations, AER is a forum for interregional cooperation.

== Historical background ==
On 15 June 1985, at Louvain-la-Neuve (Walloon Brabant), 47 Regions and 9 interregional organizations founded the Council of the Regions of Europe (CRE), which would later become the Assembly of European Regions in November 1987 at the second General meeting of the Regions of Europe in Brussels.

The year 1985 was proclaimed by the United Nations as the International Youth Year. The same year AER launched its first programme, Eurodyssey, designed to promote and encourage youth mobility.

In 1990, AER's Tabula Regionum Europae released the inaugural map depicting Europe not solely as a collection of countries but as regions. The following year, the principle of subsidiarity emerged as AER's flagship initiative, advocating for the involvement of regions in European and national decision-making. Its impact was swiftly recognized, culminating in its inclusion in the Maastricht Treaty of 1992.

The creation of the Committee of the Regions (CoR) in 1994 and the Chamber of the Regions in the framework of the Congress of Local and Regional Authorities of Europe (CLRAE) in 1994, exemplified a victory for AER in advocating for the regions in Europe.

In 1995, AER launched a campaign to promote regionalism in Europe. As a result, 300 AER members adopted in 1996 the Declaration on Regionalism in Europe immediately initializing a reference document for new and developing regions.

In 2002, AER presented its position on the “Future of Europe” to the European Convention. AER actively contributed to the drafting of the European Constitution, demonstrating strong political involvement. The final text included all AER proposals, namely

- The recognition of the regions as an important level of governance within Europe.
- The extension of the principle of subsidiarity to regional and local levels.
- The inclusion of regional cohesion in EU's objectives.

In 2008, AER established the Youth Regional Network, Europe's first and only platform of regional youth councils, parliaments, and organizations.

== Definition of "Region" ==
According to the AER statutes, in principle the term "region" refers to a territorial authority existing at the level immediately below that of the central government, with its own political representation in the form of an elected regional assembly.

== Members ==
Member regions of the Assembly of European Regions are as follows:

Country	Member regions
Albania	Berat County; Dibër County; Durrës County; Elbasan County; Fier County; Gjirokastër County; Korçë County; Kukës County; Lezhë County; Shkodër County; Tirana County; Vlorë County
Armenia	Tavush Province; Lori Province
Austria	Burgenland; Lower Austria; Tyrol; Upper Austria; Vienna
Belgium	Brussels-Capital Region; German-speaking Community; Wallonia
Bosnia and Herzegovina	Bosnian-Podrinje Canton Goražde; Brčko District; Sarajevo Canton; Zenica-Doboj
Croatia	Istria County; Krapina-Zagorje County; Osijek-Baranja County; Primorje-Gorski Kotar County; Šibenik-Knin County; Split-Dalmatia County; Varaždin County; Zagreb County
Cyprus	Union of Cyprus Municipalities
France	Corsica; Grand Est; Guadeloupe; Martinique
Georgia	Adjara; Imereti
Ireland	County Donegal; County Mayo; Údarás na Gaeltachta
Italy	Abruzzo; Molise; Sardinia; Trentino-Alto Adige; Umbria; Valle d’Aosta
Montenegro	Budva
Netherlands	Flevoland; Gelderland
Norway	Innlandet; Nordland; Østfold
Portugal	Azores; Madeira
Romania	Alba County; Arad County; Argeș County; Bihor County; Bistrița-Năsăud County; Brașov County; Buzău County; Caraș-Severin County; Călărași County; Cluj County; Covasna County; Dâmbovița County; Dolj County; Galați County; Gorj County; Harghita County; Iași County; Ilfov County; Maramureș County; Mehedinți County; Mureș County; Neamț County; Olt County; Prahova County; Satu Mare County; Sibiu County; Timiș County; Tulcea County; Vaslui County; Vrancea County
Serbia	Sumadija i Pomoravlje; Vojvodina
Slovakia	Košice Region
Slovenia	Eastern Slovenia; Western Slovenia
Spain	Catalunya; Murcia; Valencian Community
Sweden	Gävleborg; Jönköping; Norrbotten; Örebro; Värmland; Västerbotten; Västra Götaland
Switzerland	Basel-Stadt; Fribourg Canton; Zürich Canton
Turkey	Adana Province; Antalya Province; Denizli Province; Edirne Province; Erzurum Province; Gaziantep Province; İzmir Province; Muş Province; Sakarya Province
Ukraine	Association of Self-Governments Euroregion Carpathians-Ukraine; Chernivtsi Oblast; Dnipropetrovsk Oblast; Kharkiv Oblast; Kirovohrad Oblast; Kryvyi Rih; Lviv Oblast; Odesa Oblast; Odesa Raion; Pavlohrad; Poltava Oblast; Rivne Oblast; Ternopil Oblast; Transcarpathia Oblast; Zaporizhzhia Oblast

As a result of the Russian invasion of Ukraine in 2022, AER suspended Russian members.

== List of presidents of the AER ==
- Lukas Mandl - Lower Austria (Austria) - 2025-present
- Albert Castellanos - Catalonia (Spain) - 2023–2025
- Magnus Berntsson - Västra Götaland (Sweden) - 2017–2023
- Hande Özsan Bozatlı - Istanbul (Turkey) - 2013–2017
- Michèle Sabban - Île-de-France (France) - 2008–2013
- Riccardo Illy - Friuli-Venezia-Giulia (Italy) - 2004–2008
- Liese Prokop - Lower Austria (Austria) - 2000–2004
- Luc Van den Brande - Flanders (Belgium) - 1996–2000
- Jordi Pujol - Catalonia (Spain) - 1992-1996
- Carlo Bernini - Veneto (Italy) - 1988–1992
- Edgar Faure - Franche-Comté (France) - 1985–1988

== See also ==
- European integration
- Politics of Europe
- Regions of Europe
