= Adventure travel =

Type of tourism

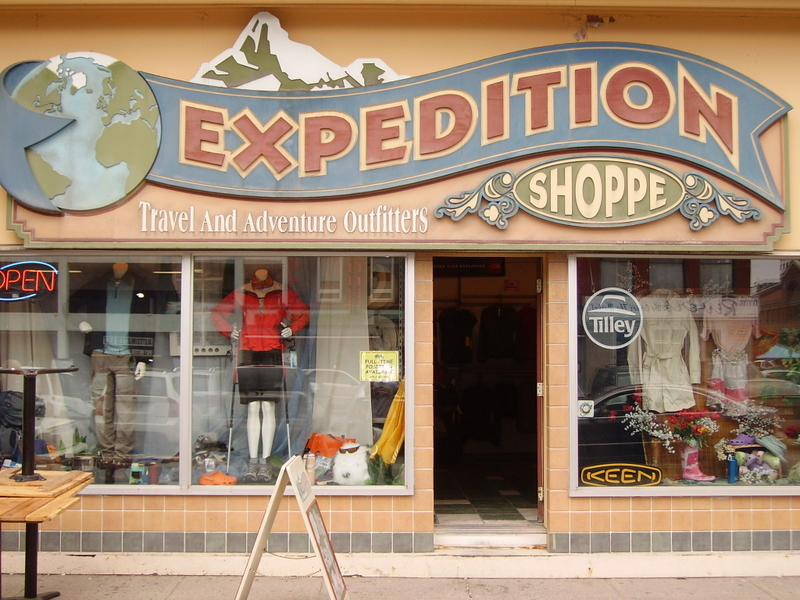
An outdoor travel and adventure outfitter in Ottawa, Ontario, Canada

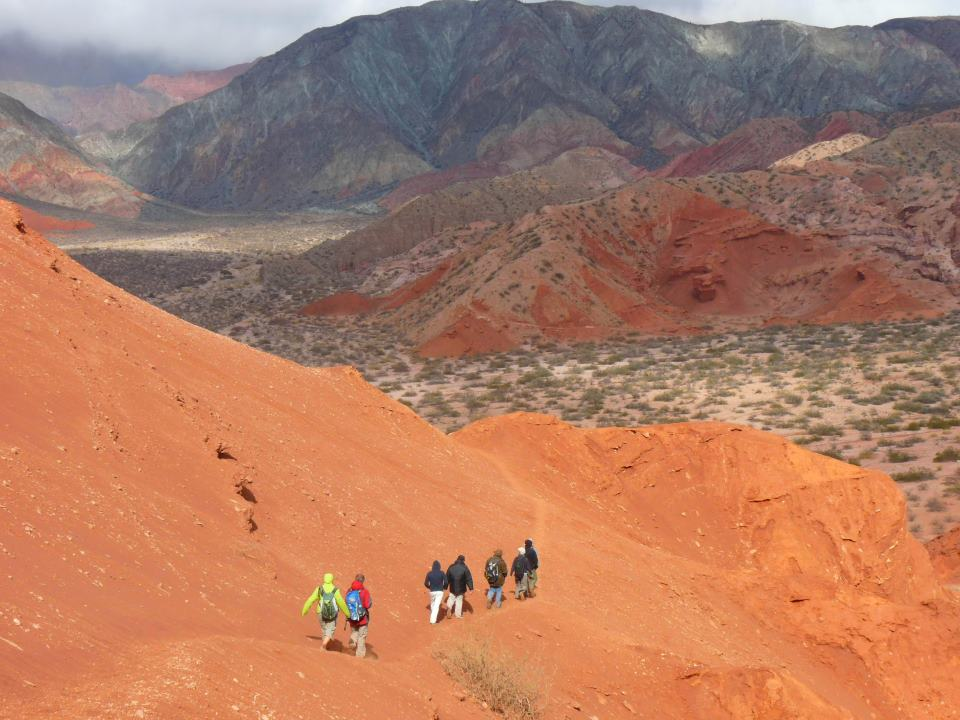
Trekking in Quebrada de las Conchas, Cafayate, Salta Province, Argentina

Adventure travel is a type of tourism, involving exploration or travel with a certain degree of risk (real or perceived), and which may require special skills and physical exertion. In the United States, adventure tourism has seen growth in late 20th and early 21st century as tourists seek out-of-the-ordinary or "roads less traveled" vacations, but lack of a clear operational definition has hampered measurement of market size and growth. According to the U.S.-based Adventure Travel Trade Association, adventure travel may be any tourist activity that includes physical activity, a cultural exchange, and connection with outdoor activities and nature.

Adventure tourists may have the motivation to achieve mental states characterized as rush or flow, resulting from stepping outside their comfort zone. This may be from experiencing culture shock or by performing acts requiring significant effort and involve some degree of risk, real or perceived, or physical danger. This may include activities such as mountaineering, trekking, bungee jumping, mountain biking, cycling, canoeing, scuba diving, rafting, kayaking, zip-lining, paragliding, hiking, exploring, Geocaching, canyoneering, river trekking, sandboarding, caving and rock climbing. Some obscure forms of adventure travel include disaster and ghetto tourism. Other rising forms of adventure travel include social and jungle tourism.

Access to inexpensive consumer technology, with respect to Global Positioning Systems, flashpacking, social networking and photography, have increased the worldwide interest in adventure travel. The interest in independent adventure travel has also increased as more specialist travel websites emerge offering previously niche locations and sports.

Adventure sports tourism has traditionally been dominated by men. Although women's participation has grown, the gender gap is still pronounced in terms of quantitative engagement in these forms of sport tourism. Yet, in competitive adventure sport tourism, the success rate of women is currently higher than that of men

== History ==
Since ancient times, humans have traveled in search for food and skills of survival, but have also engaged in adventurous travel, in explorations of sea lanes, a destination, or even a new country.

Adventurer travelers began to push to the limits, with the mountaineering of Matterhorn in 1865 and the river rafting on the Colorado River in 1869. Shortly after, two key institutions were formed, including the National Geographic Society and the Explorers Club, which continue to support adventure travel.

At the end of World War II, modern adventure began to take off, with the 1950 French Annapurna expedition and the 1953 British Mount Everest expedition. Today, it remains a niche of travel and a fast-changing sector with new variants of activities for a travel experience.

== Types ==
=== Accessible tourism ===
There is a trend for developing tourism specifically for disabled people. Adventure travel for disabled people has become a US$13 billion a year industry in North America. Some adventure travel destinations offer diverse programs and job opportunities developed specifically for the disabled.

=== Extreme travel ===
Extreme tourism involves travel to dangerous (extreme) locations or participation in dangerous events or activities. This form of tourism can overlap with extreme sport.

==== Remote travel ====
Travelling to locations far away from human settlements and/or infrastructure. Could be close to big city (few hours drive) in terms of straight line distance, but reaching the location requires a long period of time and/or a large amount of effort. Self sufficiency required, as it's difficult to get timely help or rescue in an emergency.

=== Jungle tourism ===
Jungle tourism is a subcategory of adventure travel defined by active multifaceted physical means of travel in the jungle regions of the earth. According to the Glossary of Tourism Terms, jungle tours have become a major component of green tourism in tropical destinations and are a relatively recent phenomenon of Western international tourism.

=== Overland travel ===
Overland travel or overlanding refers to an overland journey – perhaps originating with Marco Polo's first overland expedition in the 13th century from Venice to the Mongolian court of Kublai Khan. Today overlanding is a form of extended adventure holiday, embarking on a long journey, often in a group. Overland companies provide a converted truck or a bus plus a tour leader, and the group travels together overland for a period of weeks or months.

Since the 1960s overlanding has been a popular means of travel between destinations across Africa, Europe, Asia (particularly India), the Americas and Australia. The "Hippie trail" of the 60s and 70s saw thousands of young westerners travelling through the Middle East to India and Nepal. Many of the older traditional routes are still active, along with newer routes like Iceland to South Africa overland and Central Asian post soviet states.

=== Scuba diving ===
Scuba diving is a sport in which participants explore underwater places while inhaling compressed air from tanks. Scuba diving is most popular in locations with tropical coral reefs, but it may be found in almost any location with water.

Popular destinations:

- Belize's Great Blue Hole
- Tahiti
- Sipadan Island's Barracuda Point
