= Centre-Right European Association of Students =

Pan-Europoan centre-right youth political association

Centre-Right European Association of Students (CREAS)
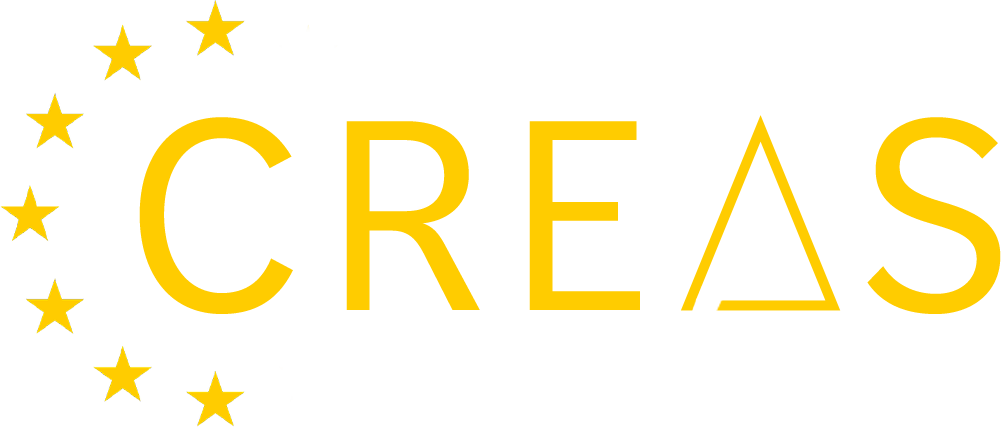
- Formation: 2022
- Type: Liberal conservatism, Christian democracy
- Headquarters: Wetstraat 89, 1040 Brussel, Belgium
- Members: 12
- Official language: English
- Chairman: (Denmark) Thomas Bøgh Rasmussen
- Website: creas-eu.com

Centre-Right European Association of Students, CREAS is a pan-European centre-right student political association. It represents over 16,000 students and young people in 12 member organisations from different countries in Europe.

== History ==
In 2022, three of European Democrat Students' founding members - Danish Conservative Students, German Association of Christian Democratic Students and Sweden based Confederation of Swedish Conservative and Liberal Students, as well as the Finnish Student Union of National Coalition Party Tuhatkunta and Belgium based Christen Democratische Studenten left the organisation.

In July 2022 in Berlin, ten founding members (AktionsGemeinschaft, Austria; Christendemocratische Studenten, Germany; Confederation of Swedish Conservative and Liberal Students, Sweden; Hrvatska akademska zajednica, Croatia; Students' League of the Conservative Party, Norway; Student Union of National Coalition Party Tuhatkunta, Finland; Občiansko Demokratická Mládež, Slovakia; Chrëschtlech-Sozial Jugend, Schüler a Studenten, Luxembourg; Christendemocratische Studenten, Belgium) established CREAS. First internal elections were conducted in April 2023, in Bonn - the first chairman was Arvid Bertilsson from Fria Moderata from Sweden. The Danish Konservative Studerende also joined the organization.

In July 2025, Nowa Generacja (Poland) and Vienotības Jaunatnes organizācija (Latvia) joined the organization. During the same meeting, mid-term elections to the board were held.

Most members are affiliated with the European People's Party.

== Members ==
- Austria: AktionsGemeinschaft
- Belgium: Christen Democratische Studenten
- Croatia: Hrvatska akademska zajednica
- Denmark: Conservative Students
- Finland: Student Union of National Coalition Party Tuhatkunta
- Germany: Association of Christian Democratic Students
- Latvia: Vienotības Jaunatnes organizācija
- Luxembourg: Christlich Soziale Jugend
- Norway: Students' League of the Conservative Party
- Poland: Nowa Generacja Młodych
- Slovakia: Občiansko Demokratická Mládež
- Sweden: Confederation of Swedish Conservative and Liberal Students

== Current Board 2025/27 ==
Chairman: Thomas Bøgh Rasmussen, Conservative Students (Denmark)

Deputy-chairs:

- Frederik von Maldeghem, Association of Christian Democratic Students (Germany)
- Sami Matikainen, Student Union of National Coalition Party Tuhatkunta (Finland) – treasurer

Vice-chairs:

- Jakub Gałka, Nowa Generacja (Poland)
- Marius D. Andersen, Students' League of the Conservative Party (Norway)
- Niko Bucalo, Hrvatska akademska zajednica (Croatia)
- Jennifer Pietsch-Tillenburg, AktionsGemeinschaft (Austria)

== Chairmen ==
- 2023–2025: Arvid Bertilsson (Confederation of Swedish Conservative and Liberal Students, Sweden)
- Since 2025: Thomas Bøgh Rasmussen (Conservative Students, Denmark)

== Policies ==
CREAS develops ideas and policy recommendations about student matters in terms of these aspects:

- Higher Education and Research
- Academic Freedom and Democracy
- Digitalisation and Innovation
- European Vision
- Mobility
