= Conservative Students =

Conservative Students may refer to:

- Federation of Conservative Students, United Kingdom
- Conservative Students (Denmark)
