= Cristian Bușoi =

Romanian physician and politician

Cristian Silviu Bușoi MEP
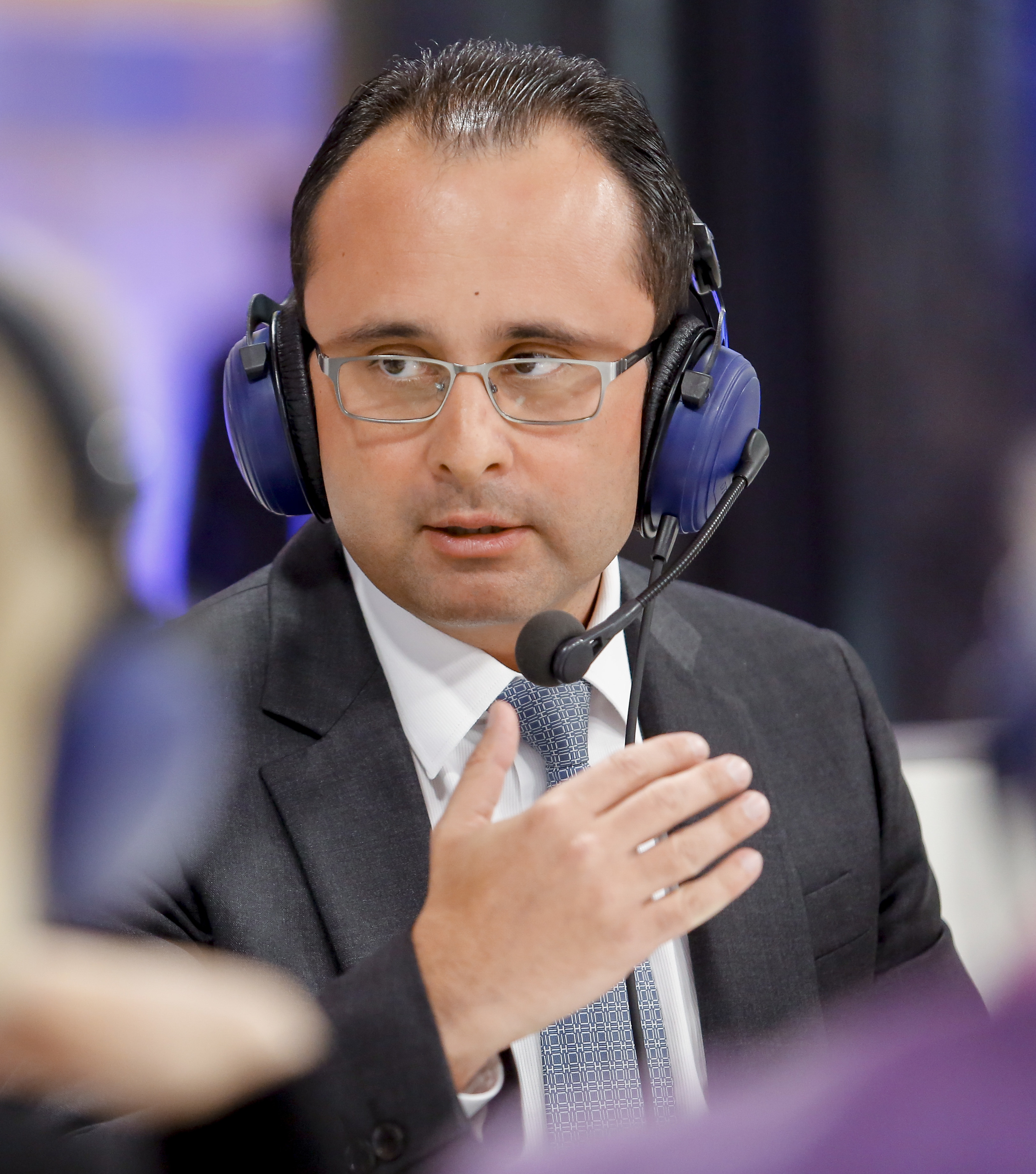

Member of the European Parliament
- Incumbent
- Assumed office 2 July 2019
- Constituency: Romania

Personal details
- Born: 1 March 1978 (age 48) Drobeta-Turnu Severin, Romania
- Party: National Liberal Party (PNL)

Cristian Silviu Bușoi (born March 1, 1978) is a Romanian physician and politician. A member of the National Liberal Party (PNL), he was a member of the Romanian Chamber of Deputies for Timiș County from 2004 to 2007, and was a Member of the European Parliament from 2007 to 2013, and again from 2014 to 2024. He is the former chair of the European Parliament's Committee on Industry, Research and Energy (ITRE).

== Education and early career ==
Bușoi was born in Drobeta-Turnu Severin and, following secondary studies completed in 1997 at the city's Traian Theoretical College, in 2003 he graduated from the Medicine Faculty of the Carol Davila University of Medicine and Pharmacy in Bucharest. The following December, he became a resident. In 2004, he also began work on two doctorates: one in Endocrinology at his alma mater, and one in Public Health and Health Management at the Victor Babeș University of Medicine and Pharmacy in Timișoara. Since 2007, he has been a lecturer at the latter institution, in the same field. In 2005, he received a degree from the Carol I National Defence University, and in 2007 he completed studies at the Law Faculty of Titu Maiorescu University.

== Political career ==
=== Career in national politics ===
Bușoi's political activity began in 1996, when he joined the PNL. From 1996 to 1998, he was a founding vice president of the Mehedinți County National Liberal Youth (TNL) chapter, also sitting on its permanent bureau from 1996 to 2000. From 2000 to 2002, he coordinated TNL programmes for Timiș, Arad, Caraș-Severin and Hunedoara counties; from 2001 to 2002, he headed the Timișoara TNL. From 2002 to 2005, he was national president of the Liberal Student Clubs, and from 2003 to 2004, he was secretary of the PNL's committee for educational policy and professional development. From 2002 to May 2004, he was an adviser to PNL vice president Călin Popescu-Tăriceanu. Bușoi belonged to the TNL's permanent national bureau from 2005 to 2007; also during that period, he was executive secretary responsible for coordinating the PNL's external relations, and vice president of the Mehedinți County PNL. Since 2007, he has been a member of the PNL's central political bureau. That year, he became vice president of the Timiș County party chapter and, although close to the Liberals' Tăriceanu faction, gained the backing of its Crin Antonescu-led wing as well. When the latter became party president in March 2009, Bușoi was elected to the presidency of the Timiș County chapter.

Bușoi's first elected office was as a member of the General Council of Bucharest, where he sat from May to December 2004. At the 2004 legislative election (following which his former boss Tăriceanu, by then PNL president, became Prime Minister), he won a seat in the Chamber of Deputies, where he sat on the health and family committee and formed part of the Romanian Parliament's delegation to the Assembly of the Western European Union. While there, he worked on legislation to end mandatory military service, as well as on education-related issues.

=== Member of the European Parliament ===
In April 2007, following the resignation of Adrian Cioroianu to become Foreign Affairs Minister, Bușoi replaced him as an MEP. Following a by-election that November, he was elected an MEP and resigned his Chamber seat. He was re-elected at the June 2009 European Parliament election. In the parliament, he was a member of the Committee on Internal Market and Consumer Protection. In this capacity, he served as the Parliament's rapporteur on the reform of the European Single Market.

In June 2013, Bușoi was named head of Romania's National Health Insurance Fund, subsequently resigning from the European Parliament. He resigned from this office in early 2014, when the PNL left the governing coalition. At that year's May European Parliament election, Bușoi won a new term as an MEP.

In April 2017, Bușoi became head of the PNL's Bucharest chapter, being elected as the only candidate. The following month, he entered the race for the PNL's national presidency, which he lost to Ludovic Orban on a 78–21 margin. In June 2019, following the party's poor performance in the capital city at the European Parliament election, he resigned from the Bucharest chapter leadership. Bușoi himself won a new term as MEP, failed to do so in 2024.

== Other activities ==
Since 2007, Bușoi has belonged to the governing board of the Institute for Liberal Studies in Bucharest, and from 1999 to 2002, he was founding president of the Youth for the 21st Century association in his native city. He is the author of Reforma liberală a serviciilor de educație în România ("Liberal Reform of Educational Services in Romania"; 2000) and of a 2008 guide to the Lisbon Treaty.

== Personal life ==
In 2006 Bușoi married Georgiana, then a notary's intern.
