= Gerd Langguth =

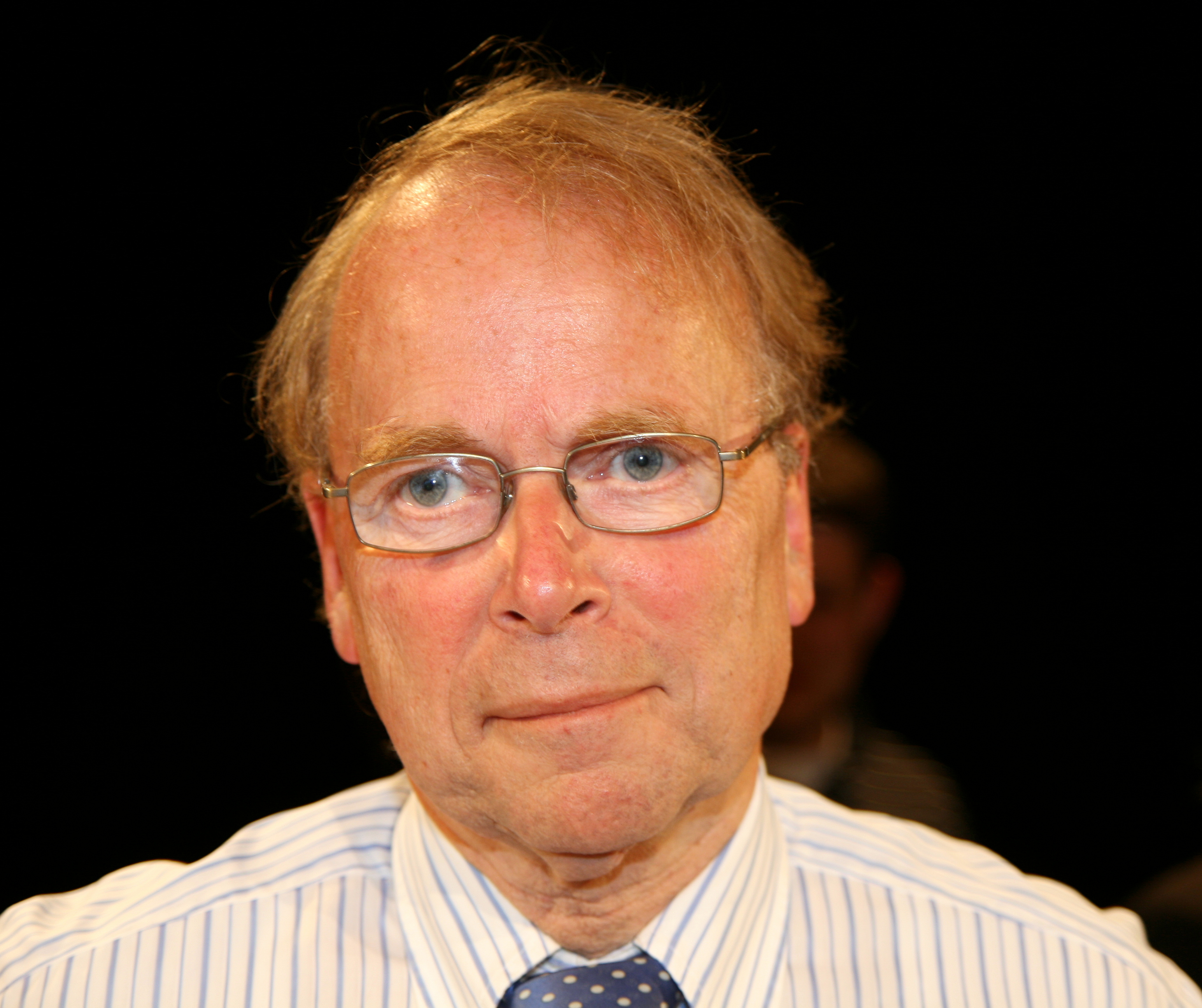
- Langguth in 2008

Member of the Bundestag; for Eßlingen
- In office 14 December 1976 – 5 November 1980
- Preceded by: Volker Hauff
- Succeeded by: Volker Hauff

Personal details
- Born: 18 May 1946 Wertheim am Main, Germany
- Died: 12 May 2013 (aged 66) Cologne, Germany
- Party: Christian Democratic Union
- Education: University of Bonn

Gerd Langguth (18 May 1946 – 12 May 2013) was a professor of political science at the University of Bonn and the author of biographies of Angela Merkel, Horst Köhler and of Rudi Dutschke

== Early life ==
Gerd Langguth was born in Wertheim. He attended the Dietrich Bonhoeffer School, a humanist Gymnasium in Wertheim am Main in Baden-Württemberg.

== University ==
While at university, from 1970 to 1974 Langguth was president of the Association of Christian Democratic Students. He later worked for the Konrad Adenauer Stiftung in Stuttgart.

From 1976 to 1980, Gerd Langguth was a member of the Bundestag for the Christian Democratic Union. He was a member of the executive committee of the CDU. From 1981 to 1985, Langguth was director of the Bundeszentrale für politische Bildung in Bonn. Between 1986 and 1987 he represented Berlin as a civil servant at a federal level. From 1988 to 1993, he was head of the European Commission's representation in Germany, in Bonn. From 1993 to 1997, Gerd Langguth was acting chairman of the Konrad Adenauer Stiftung. From 2003 to 2004 he was active on the executive board of the Bürgerkonvent, a movement for political and economic reform.

Langguth taught Political Science at the University of Bonn. He was married to food chemist Susanne Langguth.

== Teaching and publications ==
His works include biographies of Angela Merkel, Horst Köhler and, in the context of what he describes as the "myth of 1968", of the radical student leader Rudi Dutschke. Some of his works have been translated into English.

Gerd Langguth lectured on European integration. He has also held lectures on international terrorism, German institutions, and political decision processes.

Langguth died in Cologne, aged 66.
