= European Democrat Students =

Pan-European centre-right youth political association

European Democrat Students (EDS)
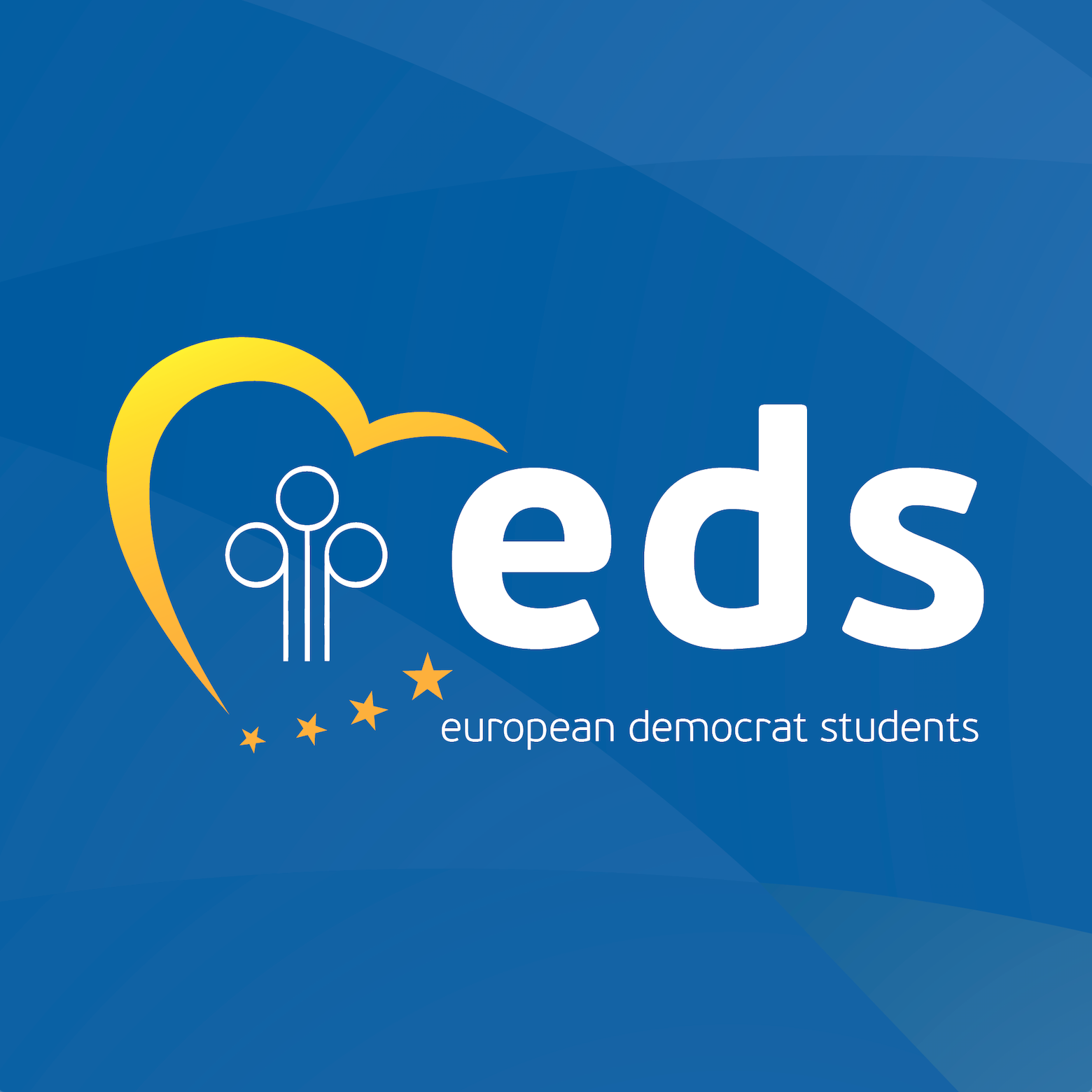
- Formation: 1961
- Type: Liberal conservatism, Christian democracy
- Headquarters: Rue du Commerce 10, B-1000, Brussels, Belgium
- Chairman: Francesco Sismondini
- Secretary General: Filip Gajic
- Parent organization: European People's Party (also European Democrat Union)
- Affiliations: International Young Democrat Union; European Youth Forum
- Website: www.edsnet.eu

European Democrat Students (EDS) is a pan-European centre-right student and youth political association, and the official student organisation of the European People's Party. Founded in Vienna by Scandinavian, German and Austrian students in 1961, it represents over 600,000 students and young people in 34 member organisations from 30 countries in Europe and Asia. Its stated goal is to promote a free, democratic and united Europe through a greater student mobility and comprehensive education policies across the continent.

== History ==
In 1958, a group of Swedish students, members of the Conservative Student League of Sweden, travelled to Vienna, Prague and West Berlin, where they attended the annual meeting of the Association of Christian Democratic Students. A cooperation between the Swedish and West German students was initiated, that was soon extended to include student organisations from the rest of Scandinavia and the United Kingdom.

In response to increasing activities of communist organisations, the liberal-conservative and christian democratic student organisations from these countries saw a need for stronger international cooperation among democratic student organisations in Europe. When the communist International Union of Students organised the "7th World Youth Festival" in Vienna in 1959, christian democratic and liberal-conservative students established the organisation Arbeitsgemeinschaft Neues Leben (Action Committee New Life), the first international organisation of centre-right students in Europe. The new organisation distributed pins with the text "Remember Hungary 1956!"

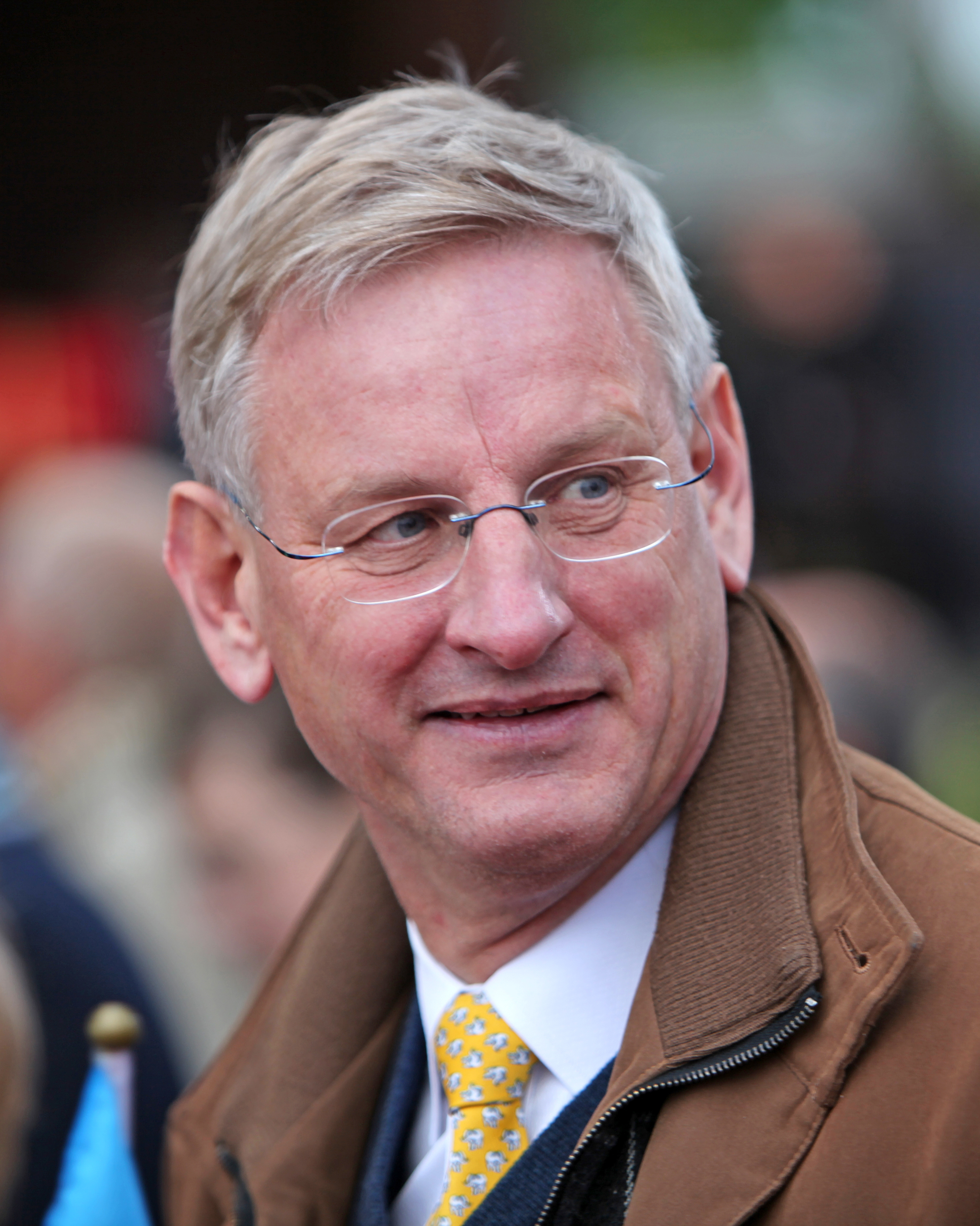
Carl Bildt proposed the current name of the organisation in 1975.

The Arbeitsgemeinschaft Neues Leben quickly evolved into the International Student Conferences, that took place in Copenhagen and Stockholm for the first time in 1960. At the third conference, in Vienna in 1961, the International of Christian-Democrat and Conservative Students, the predecessor of the European Democrat Students, was founded. The organisation considered itself to be the "first avantgarde fighter for the protection of the principles of liberty and individualism," and supported European integration and programmes for student mobility. The founding member organisations were the Freie Österreichische Studentenschaft (Austria), the Conservative Students (Denmark), the Association of Christian Democratic Students (West Germany), the Students' League of the Conservative Party (Norway), and the Confederation of Swedish Conservative and Liberal Students (FMSF). A few months later, the Federation of University Conservative and Unionist Associations (UK) and ESC (Belgium) joined.

The current name of the organisation, European Democrat Students, was adopted in 1975, after it was proposed by Carl Bildt.

Since 1997, EDS has been the official student organisation of the European People's Party (EPP). Full members status is held to the European Youth Forum (YFJ), the International Young Democrat Union (IYDU) and the Robert Schuman Institute. EDS is also recognised as a member association of the European Peoples Party (EPP), where EDS is one of the six EPP associations - in addition to recognition as an NGO at the Council of Europe.

Organising seminars, summer and winter universities, publications, campaigns and political resolutions, EDS connects like-minded students from all over the continent and shapes European student policies as well as the debates within the EPP. In 2011, the celebrations of the 50th anniversary have been conducted in Brussels and Vienna, attracting several hundreds of members, alumni, politicians and partners.

An important shift towards a more wide vision of the world was introduced during the working year 2017-2018 with the first Study Mission organized in Latin America under the title of "Caja Política". A second edition was held in 2019 in Guayaquil and Quito (Ecuador) and it successfully gathered young leaders from a dozen Latin American countries with representatives of the EDS Bureau and Member Organizations. After these events EDS became a pioneer in the center right becoming the first European organization regularly active in Latin America, Europe and Middle East.

Following internal disputes over the operations of the association and the lack of reforms, three of the founding members - Danish Conservative Students, German Association of Christian Democratic Students and Sweden based Confederation of Swedish Conservative and Liberal Students, as well as the Finnish Student Union of National Coalition Party Tuhatkunta and Belgium based Christen Democratische Studenten left the organisation since 2022. Later in 2023, due to different political views, Hungary based Fidelitas left the organisation. Meanwhile, French based Les Jeunes Républicains joined the organisation.

== Current Executive Bureau (26/28) ==
Chairman : Francesco Sismondini (Italy)

Secretary General : Filip Gajic (Croatia)

Vice-chairs :

- Mateusz Gieryga (Poland)
- Stefan Arsov (Bulgaria)
- Marios Konstanteas (Greece)
- Krista Pisani (Malta)
- Rakel Friberg (Sweden)
- Alex Zamborský (Slovakia)

Deputy Secretaries General :

- Halit Jakub Karakus (Poland)
- Amine Azzouzi (France)

Project Coordination & Outreach Officer : Vladimir Kljajic (Serbia)

== Chairmen ==
- 1962–1964: Carl-Henrik Winqwist (Sweden)
- 1964–1966: Dieter Ibielski (Germany)
- 1966–1968: Reginald E. Simmerson (UK)
- 1968–1970: Heikki S. von Hertzen (Finland)
- 1970–1971: Ian Taylor (UK)
- 1971–1972: Finn Braagaard (Denmark)
- 1972–1974: Tom Spencer (UK)
- 1974–1976: Carl Bildt (Sweden)
- 1976–1978: Scott Hamilton (UK)
- 1978–1979: Pierre Moinet (France)
- 1979–1981: Lars Eskeland (Norway)
- 1981–1982: Per Heister (Sweden)
- 1982–1984: Knut Olav Nesse (Norway)
- 1984–1985: Daniel Bischof (Switzerland)
- 1985–1986: George Anagnostakos (Greece)
- 1986–1988: Mattias Bengtsson (Sweden)
- 1988–1989: Bettina Machaczek (Germany)
- 1989–1991: Stavros Papastavrou (Greece)
- 1991–1993: Laura de Esteban (Spain)
- 1993–1994: Tim Arnold (Germany)
- 1994–1995: Fredrik Johansson (Sweden)
- 1995–1996: Andrew Reid (UK)
- 1996–1998: Gunther Fehlinger-Jahn (Austria)
- 1998–1999: Michalis Peglis (Greece)
- 1999–2000: Ukko Metsola (Finland)
- 2000–2001: Gustav Casparsson (Sweden)
- 2001–2003: Jacob Lund Nielsen (Denmark)
- 2003–2005: Alexandros Sinka (Cyprus)
- 2005–2006: Sven Henrik Häseker (Germany)
- 2006–2008: Ana Filipa Janine (Portugal)
- 2008–2009: Thomas Uhlen (Germany)
- 2009–2011: Bence Bauer (Hungary)
- 2011–2013: Juraj Antal (Slovakia)
- 2013–2015: Eva Majewski (Germany)
- 2015–2017: Georgios Chatzigeorgiou (Cyprus)
- 2017-2019: Virgilio Falco (Italy)
- 2019-2021: Carlo Angrisano Girauta (Spain)
- 2021-2024: Beppe Galea (Malta)
- Since 2024: Francesco Sismondini (Italy)

== Members ==
EDS has four categories of membership: Full members, observers, and additionally affiliate and associate members.

The full members are (founding members in bold)

- Austria: **AktionsGemeinschaft**
- Albania : Forumi Rinor i Partise Demokratike
- Belgium: Génération Engagée
- Bulgaria: Federation of Independent Student Societies
- Bulgaria: Млади Граждани за Европейско Развитие на България (МГЕРБ)
- Croatia: University Organisation of the Croatian Peasant Party
- Cyprus: FPK Protoporia
- Estonia: Union of Pro Patria and Res Publica Youth
- France: Les Jeunes Républicains
- Georgia: UYNM
- Greece: Dimokratiki Ananeotiki Protoporia – Nea Dimokratiki Foititiki Kinissi
- Italy: StudiCentro
- Italy: Nuovo Centrodestra
- Kosovo: Forumi Rinor i Lidhjes Demokratike te Kosoves
- Lithuania: Young Conservative League
- North Macedonia: Youth Forces Union of VMRO-DPMNE
- Malta: Studenti Demokristjani Maltin
- Moldova: Youth of the Liberal Democratic Party of Moldova
- Norway: **Students' League of the Conservative Party**
- Poland: Stowarzyszenie „Młodzi Demokraci”, Stowarzyszenie Nowa Generacja Młodych
- Romania: Liberal Student Clubs
- Romania: Hungarian Romanian Christian-Democrat Students of Romania
- Serbia: Youth for Innovation
- Slovakia: Občiansko-demokratická mládež
- Slovenia: Slovenian Academic Union
- Spain: New Generations of the People's Party of Spain
- Ukraine: Ukrainian Students Association
- UK: Young Conservative European Forum

The Affiliate Members are:

- Armenia: Youth of the Republican Party of Armenia
- Lebanon: Lebanese Forces Students Association

The Observer Members are:

- Moldova: Tinerii Partidului Popular European din Moldova

The Associated Member is:

- Czech Republic: Young Conservatives (Czech Republic)

== Policies ==
In a 2009 resolution, the organisation expressed its support for the Prague Declaration on European Conscience and Communism, calling for the condemnation of communism, and adopted the declaration's content as part of its general policy. "Communism as a totalitarian regime [...] can only distinct itself from Fascism and Nazism by a more recent expiry date and the consequent damage over time it was able to cause," the resolution said.

== BullsEye magazine ==
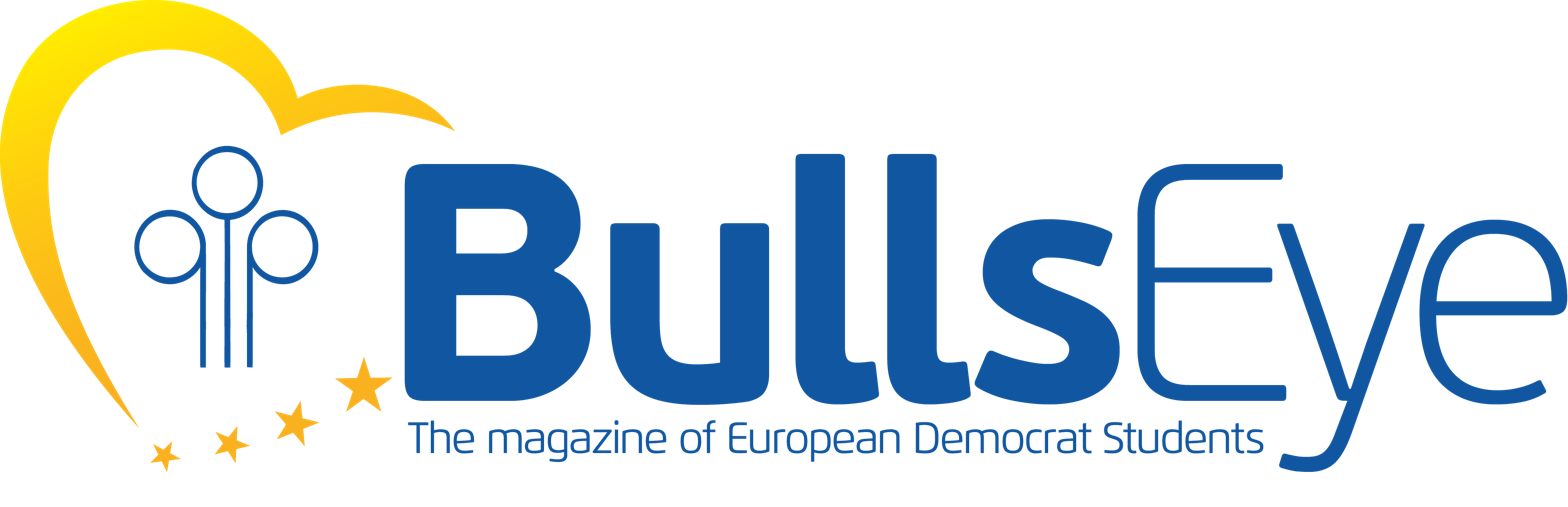
Official logo of the BullsEye magazine adopted in the 77th edition

From 1977 to 1997 EDS had an official magazine under the name of Taurus. In the year 1997 the magazine was reshuffled and a new name was adopted. Since then it became The BullsEye magazine and every Council Meeting counted with an issue of the magazine, with an editorial team that enlarged year after year reaching in 2019 the largest number of applicants. The magazine currently covers the European political present, the EU Agenda 2019-2024 and key topics of the future of Education.

In the year 2019 it reached its 77th issue, published during the EPP Congress in Zagreb.

== Literature ==
- Holger Thuss and Bence Bauer, Students on the Right Way. European Democrat Students 1961-2011, Brussels 2012, ISBN 978-9090266671
