= Ingo Schäfer =

German politician

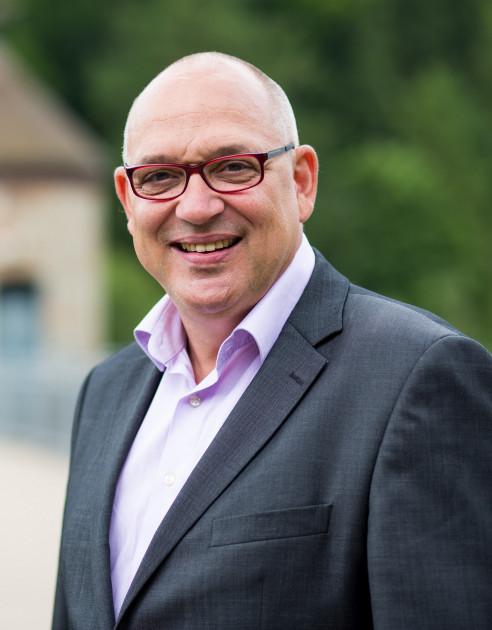
Ingo Schäfer in 2022

Ingo Schäfer (born 20 October 1965) is a German politician for the SPD, trade unionist, and was from 2021 to 2025 member of the Bundestag, the federal parliament.

== Life and politics ==
Schäfer was born 1965 in the West German town of Solingen. In his youth he worked alongside his father, who was himself a member of the SPD. and was elected directly to the Bundestag in 2021. In February 2025, Schäfer lost his seat in Bundestag for district Solingen – Remscheid – Wuppertal II against Jürgen Hardt while his 25th position on the SPD North Rhine-Westphalia list didn't pull.
