= Confederation of Swedish Conservative and Liberal Students =

Swedish student organisation

Confederation of Swedish Conservative and Liberal Students Fria moderata studentförbundet
- Chairperson: Johanna Trapp
- Founded: 1942; 84 years ago
- Ideology: Liberal conservatism Conservatism; Libertarianism; Classical liberalism Neoliberalism; Economic liberalism Anarcho-capitalism
- International affiliation: International Young Democrat Union (IYDU)
- European affiliation: Centre-Right European Association of Students (CREAS)
- Nordic affiliation: Nordic Conservative Student Union (NKSU)
- Website: www.fmsf.se

The Confederation of Swedish Conservative and Liberal Students (Swedish: Fria moderata studentförbundet, FMSF, "Free Moderate Student League") is a Swedish student organisation. It considers itself to be non-partisan, but is politically close to the Moderate Party. The organisation is a founding member of the European Democrat Students.

== History ==
The Confederation of Swedish Conservative and Liberal Students was formed in 1942 as the Swedish Union of Conservative Students (Sveriges konservativa studentförbund, SKSF) but changed its name in 1969, a couple of months before the Moderate Party adopted its current name.

The European Democrat Students arose from cooperation between the Swedish Union of Conservative Students and the Association of Christian Democratic Students, that started when a delegation from Sweden attended the annual meeting of the Association of Christian Democratic Students in West Berlin in 1958.

== Organisation ==
The Confederation of Swedish Conservative and Liberal Students consists of several independent student clubs, found in many universities across Sweden. The biggest is the one at Lund University. Other clubs that exist throughout Sweden is for instance FMS Freja in Västerås and FMSF Uppsala. The Council of Chairmen (Ordföranderådet), consisting of the chairmen of each constituent club, is formally the board of the League. In practice most power is in the hand of the Presidium which is made up by the Chairman and four deputies.

== Ideology ==
The organisation takes great pride in its approach to politics. It claims that "the arguments are more important than the opinions" and "the debate is more important than the decisions". It takes more care in fostering open debate than taking policy decisions or writing manifestos.

The League has, however, been known for its fierce libertarianism. At its annual conference debate has through the years centred on things like legalisation of narcotics, free immigration and abolishing the ban on prostitution. It, in contrast to the Moderate Party, opposed Sweden's membership of the euro.

== Relationship with the Moderate Party and the Moderate Youth League ==
Even though no formal links exist, there is considerable personal contacts between the League and the organisations of the Moderate Party. Former Prime Minister Carl Bildt is a former chairman, as well as his predecessor as leader of the Moderate Party Ulf Adelsohn and the Minister for Finance Anders E Borg. Sven Otto Littorin, the former Party Secretary and current Minister for Employment, has also been an active member.

There is widespread cross-membership between the Student League and the Moderate Youth League, which perceived as less radical than its student counterpart and remains formally connected to the party. In Uppsala, for example, most local leaders of the Youth League are also active in the Student League. This means that the neoliberalism of the Student League can also be found in the local Youth League.
