= RCDS =

RCDS may refer to

- Royal College of Defence Studies
- Rye Country Day School
- Association of Christian Democratic Students (Ring Christlich-Demokratischer Studenten), a German student organization
