= Uhlen =

Uhlen is a surname. Notable people with the surname include:

- Gisela Uhlen (1919–2007), German actress and screenwriter
- Mathias Uhlén (born 1954), Swedish biologist and biotechnologist
- Susanne Uhlen (born 1955), German actress, daughter of Gisela
- Thomas Uhlen (born 1985), German politician
