= Solingen – Remscheid – Wuppertal II =

Federal electoral district of Germany

102 Solingen – Remscheid – Wuppertal II
- Electoral district for the Bundestag
- Solingen – Remscheid – Wuppertal II in 2025
- State: North Rhine-Westphalia
- Population: 312,700 (2019)
- Electorate: 220,204 (2021)
- Major settlements: Solingen; Remscheid; Wuppertal (partial)
- Area: 201.7 km^{2}

Current electoral district
- Created: 1949
- Party: CDU
- Member: Jürgen Hardt
- Elected: 2025

Solingen – Remscheid – Wuppertal II is an electoral constituency (German: Wahlkreis) represented in the Bundestag. It elects one member via first-past-the-post voting. Under the current constituency numbering system, it is designated as constituency 102. It is located in western North Rhine-Westphalia, comprising the cities of Solingen, Remscheid, and small parts of Wuppertal.

Solingen – Remscheid – Wuppertal II was created for the inaugural 1949 federal election. From 2021 to 2025, it has been represented by Jürgen Hardt of the Social Democratic Party (SPD). Since 2025 it has been represented by Jürgen Hardt of the CDU.

== Geography ==
Solingen – Remscheid – Wuppertal II is located in western North Rhine-Westphalia. As of the 2021 federal election, it comprises the entirety of the independent cities of Solingen and Remscheid, as well as the districts of Cronenberg and Ronsdorf from the independent city of Wuppertal.

== History ==
Solingen – Remscheid – Wuppertal II was created in 1949, then known as Remscheid – Solingen. From 1965 through 1976, it was named Solingen. From 1980 through 1998, it was named Solingen – Remscheid. It acquired its current name in the 2002 election. In the 1949 election, it was North Rhine-Westphalia constituency 15 in the numbering system. From 1953 through 1961, it was number 74. From 1965 through 1998, it was number 71. From 2002 through 2009, it was number 104. In the 2013 through 2021 elections, it was number 103. From the 2025 election, it has been number 102.

Originally, the constituency comprised the cities of Solingen and Remscheid. In the 1965 through 1976 elections, it was coterminous with Solingen. In the 1980 through 1998 elections, it again comprised Solingen and Remscheid. It acquired its current borders in the 2002 election.

Election	No.	Name	Borders
1949	15	Remscheid – Solingen	Remscheid city; Solingen city
1953	74	Remscheid – Solingen	Remscheid city; Solingen city
1957	74	Remscheid – Solingen	Remscheid city; Solingen city
1961	74	Remscheid – Solingen	Remscheid city; Solingen city
1965	71	Solingen	Solingen city
1969	71	Solingen	Solingen city
1972	71	Solingen	Solingen city
1976	71	Solingen	Solingen city
1980	71	Solingen – Remscheid	Solingen city; Remscheid city
1983	71	Solingen – Remscheid	Solingen city; Remscheid city
1987	71	Solingen – Remscheid	Solingen city; Remscheid city
1990	71	Solingen – Remscheid	Solingen city; Remscheid city
1994	71	Solingen – Remscheid	Solingen city; Remscheid city
1998	71	Solingen – Remscheid	Solingen city; Remscheid city
2002	104	Solingen – Remscheid – Wuppertal II	Solingen city; Remscheid city; Wuppertal city (only Cronenberg and Ronsdorf districts)
2005	104	Solingen – Remscheid – Wuppertal II	Solingen city; Remscheid city; Wuppertal city (only Cronenberg and Ronsdorf districts)
2009	104	Solingen – Remscheid – Wuppertal II	Solingen city; Remscheid city; Wuppertal city (only Cronenberg and Ronsdorf districts)
2013	103	Solingen – Remscheid – Wuppertal II	Solingen city; Remscheid city; Wuppertal city (only Cronenberg and Ronsdorf districts)
2017	103	Solingen – Remscheid – Wuppertal II	Solingen city; Remscheid city; Wuppertal city (only Cronenberg and Ronsdorf districts)
2021	103	Solingen – Remscheid – Wuppertal II	Solingen city; Remscheid city; Wuppertal city (only Cronenberg and Ronsdorf districts)
2025	102	Solingen – Remscheid – Wuppertal II	Solingen city; Remscheid city; Wuppertal city (only Cronenberg and Ronsdorf districts)

== Members ==
The constituency was first represented by Hermann Runge of the Social Democratic Party (SPD) from 1949 to 1953. It was won by the Christian Democratic Union (CDU) in 1953 and represented by Fritz Hellwig for a single term, followed by fellow CDU member Franz Etzel for two terms. Arthur Killat of the CDU was elected in 1965 and served until 1972, when the SPD won the constituency. Heinz Schreiber then served until 1983, when Bernd Wilz of the CDU was elected. He served three terms before SPD candidate Hans-Werner Bertl won in 1994. He was succeeded in 2005 by Jürgen Kucharczyk, who served a single term. The CDU's Jürgen Hardt was elected in 2009 and re-elected in 2013 and 2017. Ingo Schäfer regained the constituency for the SPD in 2021. Jürgen Hardt regained the constituency for the CDU in 2025.

Election	Member	Party	%
1949	Hermann Runge	SPD	25.0
1953	Fritz Hellwig	CDU	38.6
1957	Franz Etzel	CDU	50.7
1961	Franz Etzel	CDU	41.5
1965	Arthur Killat	CDU	45.1
1969	Arthur Killat	CDU	39.3
1972	Heinz Schreiber	SPD	52.2
1976	Heinz Schreiber	SPD	47.6
1980	Heinz Schreiber	SPD	49.5
1983	Bernd Wilz	CDU	47.2
1987	Bernd Wilz	CDU	44.4
1990	Bernd Wilz	CDU	42.0
1994	Hans-Werner Bertl	SPD	44.7
1998	Hans-Werner Bertl	SPD	49.8
2002	Hans-Werner Bertl	SPD	47.1
2005	Jürgen Kucharczyk	SPD	43.3
2009	Jürgen Hardt	CDU	39.0
2013	Jürgen Hardt	CDU	44.3
2017	Jürgen Hardt	CDU	38.2
2021	Ingo Schäfer	SPD	32.6
2025	Jürgen Hardt	CDU	32.4

== Election results ==
=== 2025 election ===
Federal election (2025): Solingen – Remscheid – Wuppertal II
Notes:	Blue background denotes the winner of the electorate vote. Pink background denotes a candidate elected from their party list. Yellow background denotes an electorate win by a list member, or other incumbent. A ✓ or ✗ denotes status of any incumbent, win or lose respectively.						
Party	Candidate	Votes	%	±%	Party votes	%	±%
CDU	Jürgen Hardt	55,860	32.4	▲4.8	49,129	28.5	▲4.2
SPD	✗ Ingo Schäfer	47,237	27.4	▼5.2	34,679	20.1	▼9.6
AfD	Tobias Montag	31,911	18.5	▲10.9	31,539	18.3	▲10.6
Greens	Petra Kuhlendahl	14,997	8.7	▼4.2	19,322	11.2	▼3.8
Left	Rolf Breuer	12,886	7.5	▲4.3	14,540	8.4	▲4.7
BSW					8,115	4.7	
FDP	Daniel Schirm	5,555	3.2	▼7.5	8,171	4.7	▼7.8
Volt	Andreas Stadler	2,646	1.5		1,331	0.8	▲0.5
Tierschutzpartei					2,328	1.3	▼0.2
PARTEI				▼2.1	1,140	0.7	▼0.6
FW				▼1.0	668	0.4	▼0.3
Independent	Werner Link	624	0.4				
MLPD	Christoph Gärtner	429	0.2	▲0.1	110	0.1	0.0
Team Todenhöfer					418	0.2	▼0.6
dieBasis				▼1.4	404	0.2	▼0.6
PdF					305	0.2	▲0.1
BD					215	0.1	
MERA25					81	0.0	
Values					79	0.0	
Pirates							▼0.4
Gesundheitsforschung							▼0.1
Humanists							▼0.1
ÖDP							▼0.1
Bündnis C							▼0.1
SGP						0.0	0.0
Informal votes		1,511			1,082		
Total valid votes		172,145			172,574		
Turnout		173,656	90.2	▲5.9			
CDU gain from SPD	Majority	8,623	5.0				

=== 2021 election ===
Federal election (2021): Solingen – Remscheid – Wuppertal II
Notes:	Blue background denotes the winner of the electorate vote. Pink background denotes a candidate elected from their party list. Yellow background denotes an electorate win by a list member, or other incumbent. A ✓ or ✗ denotes status of any incumbent, win or lose respectively.						
Party	Candidate	Votes	%	±%	Party votes	%	±%
SPD	Ingo Schäfer	52,852	32.6	▲1.8	48,196	29.7	▲4.6
CDU	✗ Jürgen Hardt	44,778	27.6	▼10.6	39,413	24.3	▼7.3
Greens	Silvia Vaeckenstedt	20,967	12.9	▲7.1	24,296	15.0	▲7.8
FDP	Robert Weindl	17,406	10.7	▲3.0	20,256	12.5	▼1.6
AfD	Frederick Kühne	12,335	7.6	▼1.8	12,506	7.7	▼2.3
Left	Mohamad Shoan Vaisi	5,099	3.1	▼3.1	6,076	3.7	▼4.1
Tierschutzpartei					2,521	1.6	▲0.7
PARTEI	Judith Röder	3,398	2.1	▲0.6	2,044	1.3	▲0.4
dieBasis	Volker Dörner	2,233	1.4		1,913	1.2	
Team Todenhöfer					1,312	0.8	
FW	Jan Klein	1,662	1.0		1,086	0.7	▲0.5
Independent	Peter Kramer	1,070	0.7				
Pirates					624	0.4	▼0.1
Volt					470	0.3	
LIEBE					260	0.2	
Gesundheitsforschung					194	0.1	0.0
Humanists					174	0.1	0.0
LfK					168	0.1	
NPD					143	0.1	▼0.1
V-Partei3					118	0.1	0.0
ÖDP					99	0.1	0.0
Bündnis C					83	0.1	
MLPD	Christoph Gärtner	169	0.1	0.0	80	0.0	0.0
PdF					70	0.0	
du.					56	0.0	
LKR					30	0.0	
DKP					17	0.0	0.0
SGP					13	0.0	0.0
Informal votes		1,526			1,277		
Total valid votes		161,969			162,218		
Turnout		163,495	74.2	▲0.6			
SPD gain from CDU	Majority	8,074	5.0				

=== 2017 election ===
Federal election (2017): Solingen – Remscheid – Wuppertal II
Notes:	Blue background denotes the winner of the electorate vote. Pink background denotes a candidate elected from their party list. Yellow background denotes an electorate win by a list member, or other incumbent. A ✓ or ✗ denotes status of any incumbent, win or lose respectively.						
Party	Candidate	Votes	%	±%	Party votes	%	±%
CDU	✓ Jürgen Hardt	61,871	38.2	▼6.1	51,318	31.6	▼7.4
SPD	Ingo Schäfer	49,863	30.8	▼2.6	40,743	25.1	▼5.2
AfD	Frederick Kühne	15,303	9.5	▲5.8	16,221	10.0	▲5.7
FDP	Karin van der Most	12,548	7.8	▲5.1	22,947	14.1	▲8.1
Left	Adrian Scheffels	10,105	6.2	▲0.4	12,689	7.8	▲1.1
Greens	Ilka Brehmer	9,403	5.8	▼1.3	11,726	7.2	▼0.8
Tierschutzpartei					1,346	0.8	
PARTEI	Matthias Streib	2,403	1.5		1,331	0.8	▲0.3
AD-DEMOKRATEN					1,214	0.7	
Pirates					774	0.5	▼2.0
NPD					334	0.2	▼0.8
FW					331	0.2	0.0
DM					249	0.2	
DiB					185	0.1	
V-Partei³					173	0.1	
Gesundheitsforschung					171	0.1	
BGE					166	0.1	
ÖDP					164	0.1	0.0
Volksabstimmung					140	0.1	▼0.1
MLPD	Gabriele Fechtner	266	0.2	▼0.1	106	0.1	0.0
Die Humanisten					102	0.1	
DKP					21	0.0	
SGP					18	0.0	0.0
Informal votes		2,257			1,550		
Total valid votes		161,762			162,469		
Turnout		164,019	73.6	▲2.4			
CDU hold	Majority	12,008	7.4	▼3.5			

=== 2013 election ===
Federal election (2013): Solingen – Remscheid – Wuppertal II
Notes:	Blue background denotes the winner of the electorate vote. Pink background denotes a candidate elected from their party list. Yellow background denotes an electorate win by a list member, or other incumbent. A ✓ or ✗ denotes status of any incumbent, win or lose respectively.						
Party	Candidate	Votes	%	±%	Party votes	%	±%
CDU	✓ Jürgen Hardt	70,269	44.3	▲5.3	62,029	39.0	▲7.1
SPD	Sven Wiertz	52,931	33.4	▼0.9	48,123	30.3	▲3.5
Greens	Ursula Linda Zarniko	11,334	7.1	▼0.9	12,676	8.0	▼2.2
Left	Gunhild Böth	9,222	5.8	▼2.6	10,740	6.8	▼2.6
AfD	Hans Werner Karl Schmitz	5,784	3.6		6,853	4.3	
Pirates	Ulrich Hasecke	4,432	2.8		3,901	2.5	▲0.7
FDP	Gerd Brems	4,170	2.6	▼6.1	9,650	6.1	▼10.2
NPD					1,590	1.0	0.0
PARTEI					786	0.5	
PRO					500	0.3	
FW					347	0.2	
REP					345	0.2	▼0.2
Volksabstimmung					320	0.2	▲0.1
BIG					263	0.2	
ÖDP					216	0.1	0.0
Nichtwahler					200	0.1	
MLPD	Gabriele Gärtner	430	0.3		177	0.1	▲0.1
Party of Reason					138	0.1	
RRP					74	0.0	▼0.1
PSG					36	0.0	0.0
Die Rechte					25	0.0	
BüSo					21	0.0	0.0
Informal votes		2,357			1,908		
Total valid votes		158,572			159,021		
Turnout		160,929	71.2	▲0.6			
CDU hold	Majority	17,338	10.9	▲6.2			

=== 2009 election ===
Federal election (2009): Solingen – Remscheid – Wuppertal II
Notes:	Blue background denotes the winner of the electorate vote. Pink background denotes a candidate elected from their party list. Yellow background denotes an electorate win by a list member, or other incumbent. A ✓ or ✗ denotes status of any incumbent, win or lose respectively.						
Party	Candidate	Votes	%	±%	Party votes	%	±%
CDU	Jürgen Hardt	62,365	39.0	▼2.0	51,248	32.0	▼0.9
SPD	✗ Jürgen Kucharczyk	54,910	34.3	▼8.9	42,869	26.7	▼11.7
FDP	Hans Lothar Schiffer	13,940	8.7	▲3.3	26,079	16.3	▲3.6
Left	Heinz Hillebrand	13,418	8.4	▲3.7	15,057	9.4	▲3.6
Greens	David Schichel	12,956	8.1	▲3.8	16,357	10.2	▲3.0
Pirates					2,891	1.8	
NPD	Detlef Hartmann	2,446	1.5	▲0.4	1,668	1.0	▲0.2
Tierschutzpartei					1,103	0.7	▲0.1
FAMILIE					819	0.5	▲0.1
RENTNER					668	0.4	
REP					664	0.4	▼0.1
RRP					223	0.1	
Volksabstimmung					193	0.1	0.0
ÖDP					157	0.1	
DVU					139	0.1	
Centre					102	0.1	0.0
MLPD					91	0.1	0.0
BüSo					44	0.0	0.0
PSG					26	0.0	0.0
Informal votes		2,157			1,794		
Total valid votes		160,035			160,398		
Turnout		162,192	70.5	▼6.6			
CDU gain from SPD	Majority	7,455	4.7				

=== 2005 election ===
Federal election (2005): Solingen – Remscheid – Wuppertal II
Notes:	Blue background denotes the winner of the electorate vote. Pink background denotes a candidate elected from their party list. Yellow background denotes an electorate win by a list member, or other incumbent. A ✓ or ✗ denotes status of any incumbent, win or lose respectively.						
Party	Candidate	Votes	%	±%	Party votes	%	±%
SPD	Jürgen Kucharczyk	76,358	43.3	▼3.8	67,871	38.4	▼3.0
CDU	Bernd Cancer	72,385	41.0	▲3.4	58,141	32.9	▼1.4
FDP	Gabriele Reimers	9,506	5.4	▼2.7	22,293	12.6	▲1.2
Left	Hans-Joachim Wiertz	8,336	4.7	▲3.6	10,182	5.8	▲4.3
Greens	Martina Zsack-Möllmann	7,600	4.3	▼0.2	12,718	7.2	▼1.4
NPD	Thorsten Crämer	1,963	1.1		1,482	0.8	▲0.6
Tierschutzpartei					964	0.5	▲0.1
REP					7823	0.5	
GRAUEN					781	0.4	▲0.1
Familie					741	0.4	▲0.2
MLPD	Gabriele Gardener	375	0.2		167	0.1	
PBC					292	0.2	▼0.1
From Now on... Democracy Through Referendum					177	0.1	
Socialist Equality Party					65	0.0	
Centre					49	0.0	
BüSo					47	0.0	0.0
Informal votes		2,601			2,331		
Total valid votes		176,523			176,793		
Turnout		179,124	77.1	▼1.7			
SPD hold	Majority	3,973	2.3				
