= Students' League of the Conservative Party (Norway) =

Student wing of the Conservative Party of Norway

Students' League of the Conservative Party Høyres Studenterforbund HS
- Chairperson: Antonio Gade Wilhelmsen Serri
- Founded: 1961; 65 years ago
- Headquarters: Oslo, Norway
- Ideology: Liberal conservatism Pro-Europeanism
- Mother party: Conservative Party
- European affiliation: European Democrat Students
- European affiliation: Centre-Right European Association of Students

The Students' league of the Conservative Party (Norwegian: Høyres Studenterforbund) is the student wing of the Conservative Party of Norway. It was founded in 1961 under the name Norway's Conservative Students' League (Norwegian: Norges Konservative Studenterforbund). As of 2011, Henrik Erevik Riise is the leader of the league. The organisation is a founding member of the European Democrat Students and Centre-Right European Association of Students.

== Leaders ==
Leaders

- 1961–1964 Egil Alnæs
- 1965–1966 Stein Østre
- 1967–1968 Iver Huitfeldt
- 1968–1969 Ellemann Ellingsen
- 1969–1970 Per Harg
- 1970–1971 Ellemann Ellingsen
- 1971–1973 Njål Moe
- 1973–1974 Bjørn Ketilsson
- 1974–1975 Hans Kr. Lehmann
- 1975–1976 Marianne B. Skou
- 1976–1977 Svein I. Blystad
- 1977–1979 Lars Eskeland
- 1979–1980 Doosi Foldal
- 1980–1981 Rolf A. Hillestad
- 1981–1982 Knut Olav Nesse
- 1982–1984 Egil Herman Sjursen
- 1984–1986 Fredrik Carlsen
- 1986–1987 Lars Arne Ryssdal
- 1987–1989 Hermann Smith-Sivertsen

- 1989–1990 Asbjørn M. Bonvik
- 1990–1991 Teddy Kjendlie
- 1991–1992 Lars Andreas Lunde
- 1992–1993 Lars Magnussen
- 1993–1994 Sonja Lunde
- 1994–1996 Øyvind Såtvedt
- 1996–1997 Jo Haugen
- 1997–1998 Hårek Hansen
- 1998–1999 Marianne Grimstad Hansen
- 1999–2001 Anita Leirvik
- 2001–2003 Torbjørn Furulund
- 2003–2004 Toril Roberg
- 2004–2005 Eivind Kildal
- 2005–2006 Elisabeth Torkildsen
- 2006–2007 Christoffer Wiig
- 2007–2008 Dag Josef Foss Alsvik
- 2008–2009 Peter André Schwarz
- 2009–2010 Sigve Reme Sand
- 2010–2011 Henrik Erevik Riise
- 2011-d.d Morten Olimb

Prime secretaries

- 1986–1987 Knut Albert Solem
- 1987–1989 Tore Jan Dybsland
- 1989–1989 Ann Kristin Karlsen
- 1989–1991 Sindre Finnes
- 1991–1993 Christian Hellevang
- 1993–1995 Stian Haraldsen
- 1995–1997 Dag Ekelberg
- 1997–1999 Helge Skinnes
- 2005–2006 Christoffer Wiig
- 2006–2008 Peter André Schwarz
- 2008–2009 Åsmund Haugseth/Stian Tvede Karlsen
- 2009–2011 Kristian Tveit Venås
- 2011-d.d. Malmfrid Wirstad
