= Stefan Arsov =

Bulgarian politician

Member of National Assembly
- Incumbent
- Assumed office 30 April 2026

Personal details
- Born: 19 January 1996 (age 30)
- Party: GERB

Stefan Arsov (born January 19, 1996) is a Bulgarian politician, since 2026 a deputy to the National Assembly. From 2024 to 2026, he served as governor of the Sofia City Province.

== Early life and education ==
He obtained a Master’s degree in law from Sofia University “St. Kliment Ohridski”. He worked in the private sector as well as in public administration.

== Political career ==
He became involved in the youth wing of the GERB party – MGERB. He also joined the party, where he became a member of the Executive Commission and the GERB coordinator in Sofia. In the parliamentary elections in April 2021, he unsuccessfully ran for the National Assembly of Bulgaria from the GERB list. In 2023, he was appointed deputy governor of the Sofia City Province.

In April 2024, the government appointed him as governor of the Sofia City Province. In August of the same year, he became vice president of European Democrat Students – the student organization of the European People’s Party. On 23 February 2026, he resigned from the position of governor of Sofia and was succeeded by Vyara Todejewa. In the 2026 parliamentary elections, he ran from the 2nd place on the GERB list in Sofia and won a seat as a deputy. He was appointed Secretary of Parliament.
