= Austrian Students' Association =

General students' representative body in Austria

Austrian Students' Union
- Österreichische Hochschülerinnen- und Hochschülerschaft
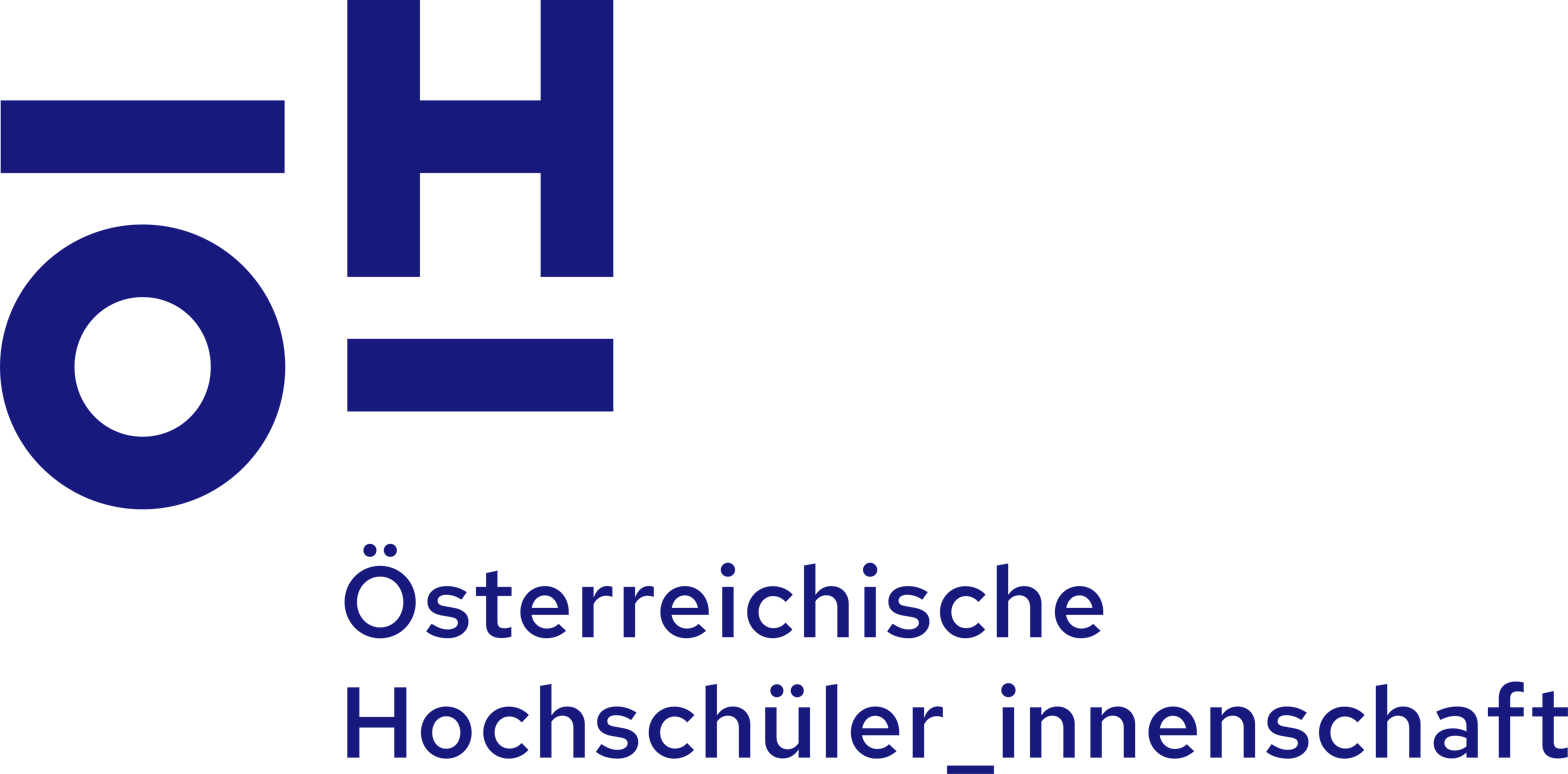

Agency overview
- Formed: 1935; 91 years ago as Hochschülerschaft Österreichs
- Headquarters: Taubstummengasse 7–9; Vienna
- Annual budget: ca. 15,8 million Euro (2022)
- Agency executive: Sarah Rossmann
- Parent department: Ministry of Education (Austria)
- Website: www.oeh.ac.at

The Austrian Students' Union by statutory body (German: Österreichische Hochschülerinnen- und Hochschülerschaft, ÖH) is the general students' representative body in Austria and serves as the students' government by federal law. The ÖH is a member of the European Students' Union. Membership in the ÖH is compulsory for every university student in Austria, including PhD candidates, thus representing more people then living in the smaller Austrian states.

In Austrian politics, its national parliament, formally called the Federal Representation, is very often just referred to as essentially pars pro toto the entire statutory body itself.

It is often viewed as the most promising political training ground for future lawmakers. Many former active elected members end up in parliament or government later on.

== Structure ==
The statutes of the ÖH are regulated in a federal law, the "Hochschülerinnen und Hochschülerschaftsgesetz" (HSG).

The HSG also includes regulations on the funding of the ÖH and its parts and the duties and rights of the students representatives.

The Students Union is structured into:

- Studienvertretung: board of representatives for each study (or group of related studies). It consists of typically 5 members. person-based direct election.
- Fakultätsstudienvertretung
- Universitätsvertretung: board of university students representatives. list based direct election.
- Bundesvertretung: The National parliament of the ÖH, formally known as Federal Representation. Its 55 members are voted on a national level. Additionally, the chairperson of every university has the right to an advisory role to send in drafts, but no full member or voting rights.

Biannually, in every odd year there are general elections. Turnout declined heavily over the decades, from about 70% in 1965 to turnouts in the 20% range in recent elections.

Students are organized in political groups, called lists, which are somewhat independent from its counterparts in national politics, but usually linked to an Austrian political party.

The bigger and historically relevant groups, the Socialist Students of Austria are tied to the Social Democrats, AktionsGemeinschaft is influenced by the Austrian Peoples Party, GRAS is a youth organization supported by the Green Party, RFS is part of the Freedom Party, JUNOS students is the student organization of the liberal NEOS.

== History ==
- 1935: foundation of the ÖH within the political system of the Federal State of Austria
- 1945 reformation of the institution after World War II
- 1946: first general election
- 1947: ÖH becomes a public statutory body
- 1950: ÖH obtains the right to formally examine laws concerning education
- 1952: first demonstration against student fees
- 1959: the ÖH establishes the Austrian Student Aid Foundation (also: home4students)
- 1962: one week strike
- 1973, 1975: strengthening of the position of the ÖH by new laws
- 1987, 1992, 1996, 2000, 2002, 2004 and especially in 2010 and 2011: demonstrations against various steps of loss of social benefits for students and legal restrictions of students representation.

== See also ==
- European Students' Union (ESU), of which ÖH is a member.
- EURODOC European Council of doctoral candidates and junior researchers. ÖH is a member.
- Students' Union
