= AktionsGemeinschaft =

Austrian students' organization

AktionsGemeinschaft AktionsGemeinschaft (AG)
- European affiliation: Centre-Right European Association of Students European Democrat Students
- Website: Official website

AktionsGemeinschaft (shortened AG - German for community for action / effort), is an Austrian political students' organization. In the national-wide election in 2025, it regained its position as the second strongest political faction in the Federal Representation, the national parliament of the Austrian Students' Association, winning 12 out of 55 mandates.

The group considers itself to be non-partisan, but is politically closely tied to the Austrian People's Party, which temporarily funded parts of its activities in the 1990s. AG is an associated member of the European Peoples Party.

AktionGemeinschaft is currently chaired by Laurin Weninger, who was elected as its chairman in 2025. The organization was founded in the early 1980s by a merger of the Austrian Students' Union (ideologically close to the Austrian People's Party) and the non-partisan service-oriented Austrian Students' Forum and the centrist Election block. Many of its members have also been and are active in various Christian and conservative students' organisations.

AktionsGemeinschaft is a member organisation of both the Centre-Right European Association of Students as well as the European Democrat Students. Founded in Vienna by Scandinavian, German and Austrian students in 1961, the Freie Österreichische Studentenschaft, a legal predecessor of AG, was one of EDS initial founders. At European and International level, AktionsGemeinschaft is represented by its International Secretary, Moriz Jeitler.

== Notable former members ==
- Gerald Bast
- Gunther Fehlinger-Jahn
- Andreas Maislinger
- Wilhelm Molterer
- Gerfried Sperl
- Ernst Strasser
- Matthias Strolz
- Markus Wallner
- Harald Mahrer
