= Austrian Student Aid Foundation =

Austrian foundation

Coordinates: 48°13′11.43″N 16°21′16.11″E

Home4students Stiftung
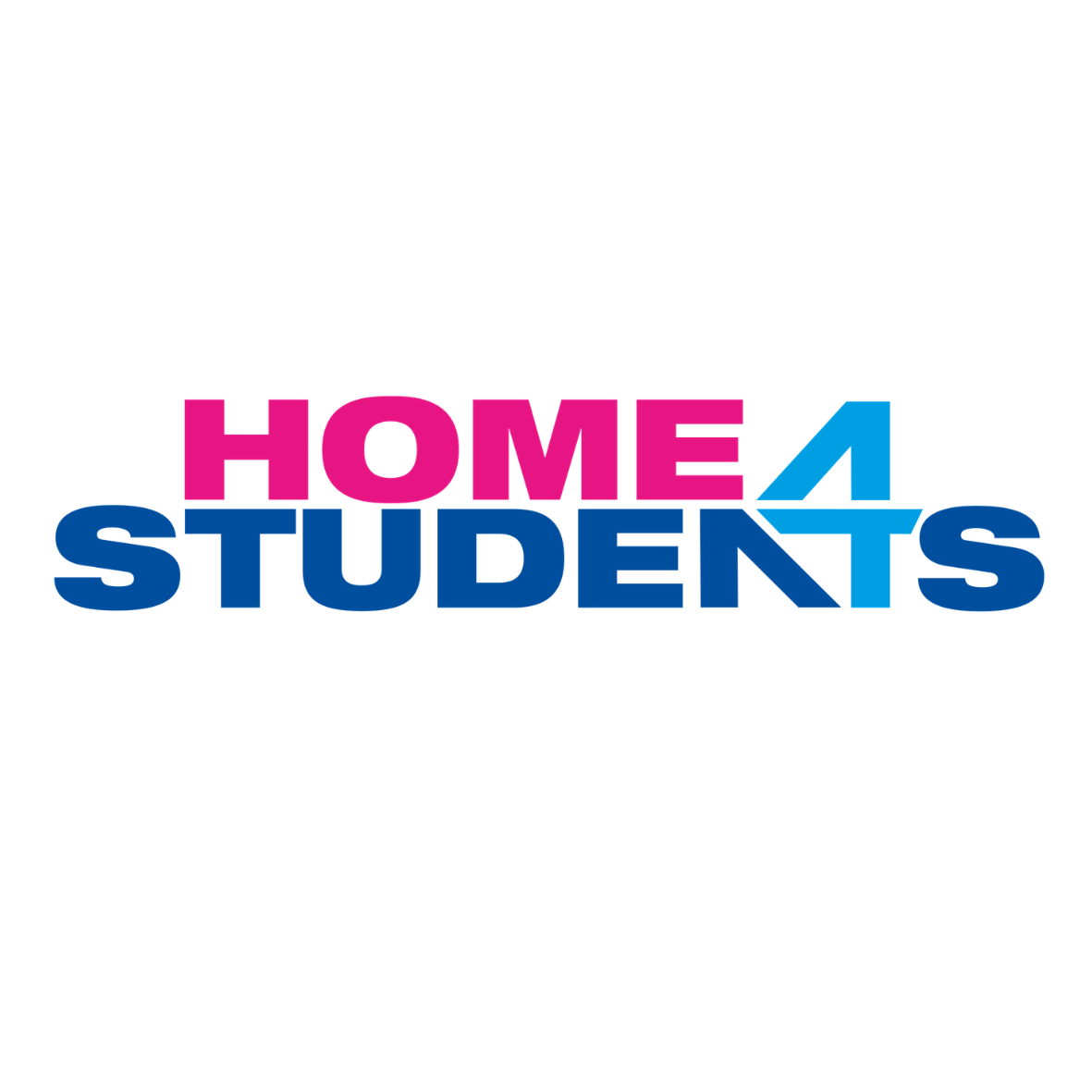
- Type: Foundation
- Founded: Vienna, Austria (July 9, 1959)
- Founder: Austrian National Union of Students
- Headquarters: Sensengasse 2b Vienna, Austria
- Services: Student Housing
- Number of employees: ca. 60
- Website: www.home4students.at/en

The Home4students Stiftung (formerly: Österreichische Studentenförderungsstiftung) is one of the largest providers of student housing (term used in Austria) or student dormitories (term used in Germany) in Austria. The Home4students Stiftung is a non-profit provider of student accommodation in Austria.

Since September 2026, the organization has officially been known as the Home4students Stiftung.

== Purpose ==
The aim of the foundation is to support students throughout Austria during their university education by providing affordable accommodation in close proximity to colleges and universities, with particular consideration given to students from financially disadvantaged backgrounds. Currently, around 2.600 students from 96 nations have found accommodation in one of the 19 residences in Vienna, Graz, Klagenfurt, Innsbruck and Salzburg.

== History ==
On 6 May 1958, the Central Committee of the Austrian Students' Association (de: Österreichischen Hochschüler_innenschaft) decided to establish the Austrian Student Aid Foundation (dt. Österreichische Studentenförderungsstiftung). On July 9 1959, the foundation began its work with its first board meeting. At the time of its establishement, the foundation's assets consisted of a 99-year right of usufruct (unrestricted right of use subject to an obligation to maintain the properties) over the properties at Führichgasse 10, 1010 Vienna, and Döblinger Hauptstraße 55, 1190 Vienna. Both properties were owned by the Austrian Students' Association.

Since 1958, the number of residential units has been continuously expanded. There are now a total of 19 student residences throughout Austria (as of April 2026).

For several years, four residences across Austria operated as AllYouNeed Hotels during the summer months. A separate subsidiary was established for this purpose in 1980. The operation of the summer hotels was discontinued in 2022.

In 1980, another subsidiary, Studentenwohnungsservice Gesellschaft m.b.H. (SWS), was established to operate student apartments and shared accommodation. The Austrian Students' Union (ÖH) held a 40% stake in the company. Operations o SWS were discontinued in 2024, and the remaining apartments were integrated into the foundation.

In 2007, the brand name "home4students" was introduced. The current Home4students logo has been in use since September 2025. Since September 2026, the foundation has officially been known as Home4students Stiftung.

== Organizational Structure ==
Home4students is a non-profit foundation established under the Federal Foundations and Funds Act (dt. Bundes-Stiftungs- und Fondsgesetz). This means that all income generated by the non-profit organization (NPO) is reinvested in its operations and thus benefits its residents. The foundation is independent and therefore finances its operations through the fees paid by its residents. Its operations are consequently neither supported nor subsidized by public or private entities. Home4students is also non-political and places great importance on independence in all respects.

The foundation is managed by two executive directors. Its supervisory body, pursuant to Section 21 of the Federal Foundations and Funds Act (BStFG), consists of a six-member supervisory board. In addition, a 15-member Board of Trustees oversees the affairs of Home4students. The members of the Board of Trustees mainly come from the university sector: eight members are nominated by the electoral groups standing in the elections to the Federal Representation of the Austrian Students' Union, three members are university professors, and four members are subject-matter experts from relevant fields.

== Team ==
Home4students employs around 60 people across Austria. Through their work, they ensure the operation and provision of Home4students' services and contribute to the well-being of its residents.

== Student Residences ==
There are a total of 19 Home4students dormitories with around 2.600 places across Austria. Of these, 11 student residences are located in Vienna with around 1.300 places; two in Graz with around 400 places; two in Klagenfurt with around 240 places; three in Innsbruck with around 560 places; and one in Salzburg with around 107 places.

The Home4students Höfergasse in Vienna is the smallest student residence in Austria with 12 places. The residence is exclusively available to female students.

== Holdings ==
Dormitory	Address	Beds	Duration p.A.
Große Schiffgasse	Große Schiffgasse 12, 1020 Vienna	accommodation for 122 students	12-month-dormitory (1.10.–31.8.)
Schäffergasse	Schäffergasse 2, 1040 Vienna	accommodation for 154 students	12-month-dormitory (1.10.–31.8.)
Neudeggergasse	Neudeggergasse 21, 1080 Vienna	accommodation for 71 students	12-month-dormitory (1.10.–31.8.)
Boltzmanngasse	Boltzmanngasse 10, 1090 Vienna	accommodation for 78 students	12-month-dormitory (1.10.–31.8.)
Höfergasse	Höfergasse 13, 1090 Vienna	accommodation for 12 students	12-month-dormitory (1.10.–31.8.)
Sensengasse	Sensengasse 2b, 1090 Vienna	accommodation for 201 students	12-month-dormitory (1.10.–31.8.)
Erlachplatz	Erlachplatz 5, 1100 Vienna	accommodation for 86 students	12-month-dormitory (1.10.–31.8.)
Döblinger Hauptstraße I	Döblinger Hauptstraße 55, 1190 Vienna	accommodation for 84 students	12-month-dormitory (1.10.–31.8.)
Döblinger Hauptstraße II	Döblinger Hauptstraße 55, 1190 Vienna	accommodation for 65 students	12-month-dormitory (1.10.–31.8.)
Ullmannstraße	Ullmannstraße 54, 1150 Vienna	accommodation for 388 students	12-month-dormitory (1.10.–31.8.)
Pop Up Dorms - Seestadt Aspern	Sonnenallee 105, 1220 Vienna	accommodation for 44 students	12-month-dormitory (1.10.–31.8.)
Neutorgasse	Neutorgasse 46, 8010 Graz	accommodation for 291 students	10-month-dormitory (1.9.-30.6.)
Leechgasse	Leechgasse 1, 8010 Graz	accommodation for 117 students	12-month-dormitory (1.10.–31.8.)
Nautilusweg I	Nautilusweg 11, 9020 Klagenfurt	accommodation for 115 students	12-month-dormitory (1.10.–31.8.)
Nautilusweg II	Nautilusweg 11, 9020 Klagenfurt	accommodation for 123 students	12-month-dormitory (1.10.–31.8.)
Glockengasse	Glockengasse 4b, 5020 Salzburg	accommodation for 107 students	12-month-dormitory (1.10.–31.8.)
Höttinger Au	Höttinger Au 34, 6020 Innsbruck	accommodation for 229 students	10-month-dormitory (1.9.-30.6.)
Technikerstraße	Techniker Straße 7, 6020 Innsbruck	accommodation for 259 students	12-month-dormitory (1.10.–31.8.)
EUREGIO Campus	EUREGIO Campus, 6020 Innsbruck	accommodation for 72 students	12-month-dormitory (1.10.–31.8.)
