= Mads Strange =

Danish politician (born 1999)

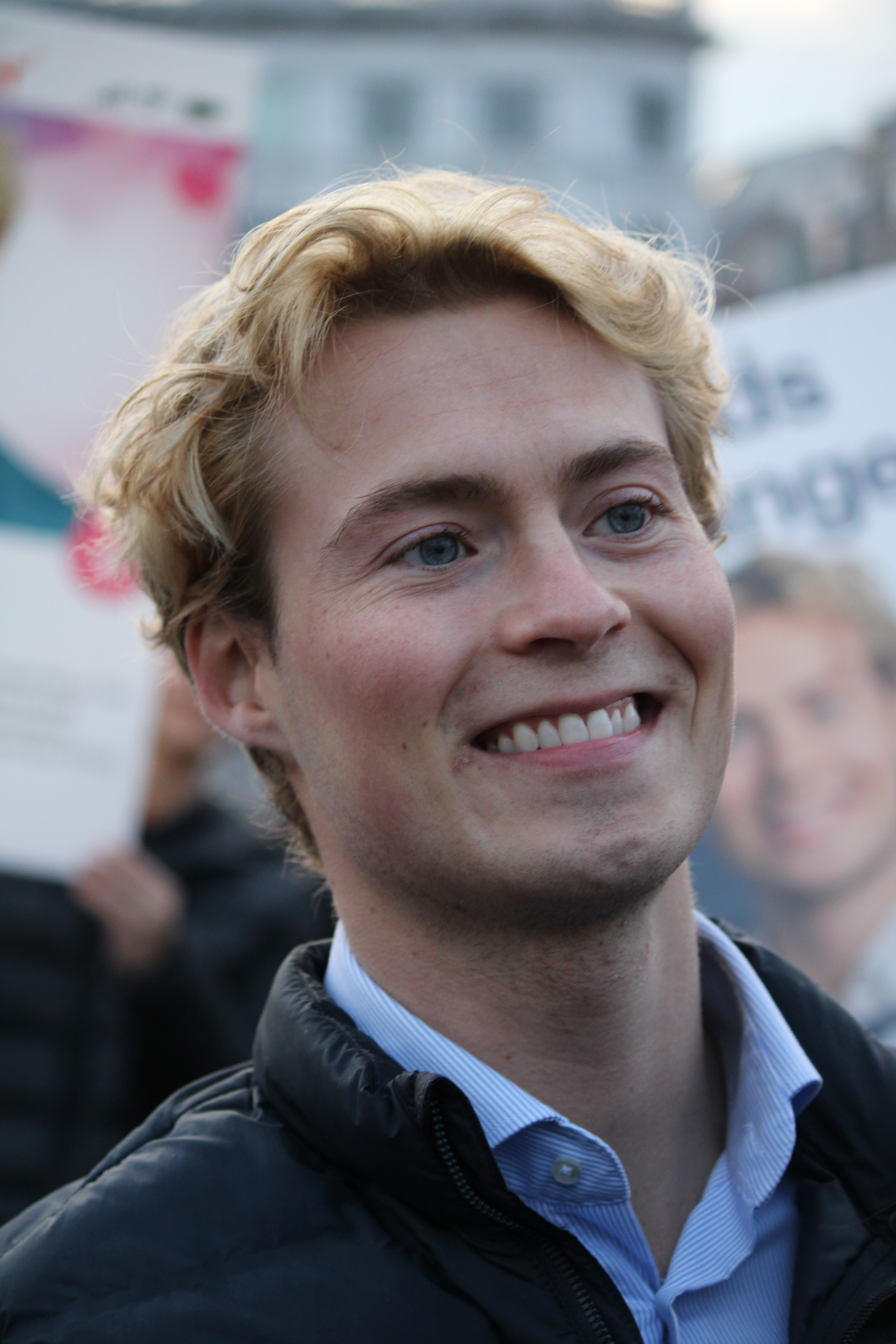
- Strange in 2026

Member of the Folketing
- Incumbent
- Assumed office 24 March 2026
- Constituency: Copenhagen

Personal details
- Born: 7 November 1999 (age 26) Denmark
- Party: Liberal Alliance

Mads Strange Vaarby (born 7 November 1999) is a Danish politician who was elected member of the Folketing in 2026. He previously served as chairman of Conservative Students at the University of Copenhagen.

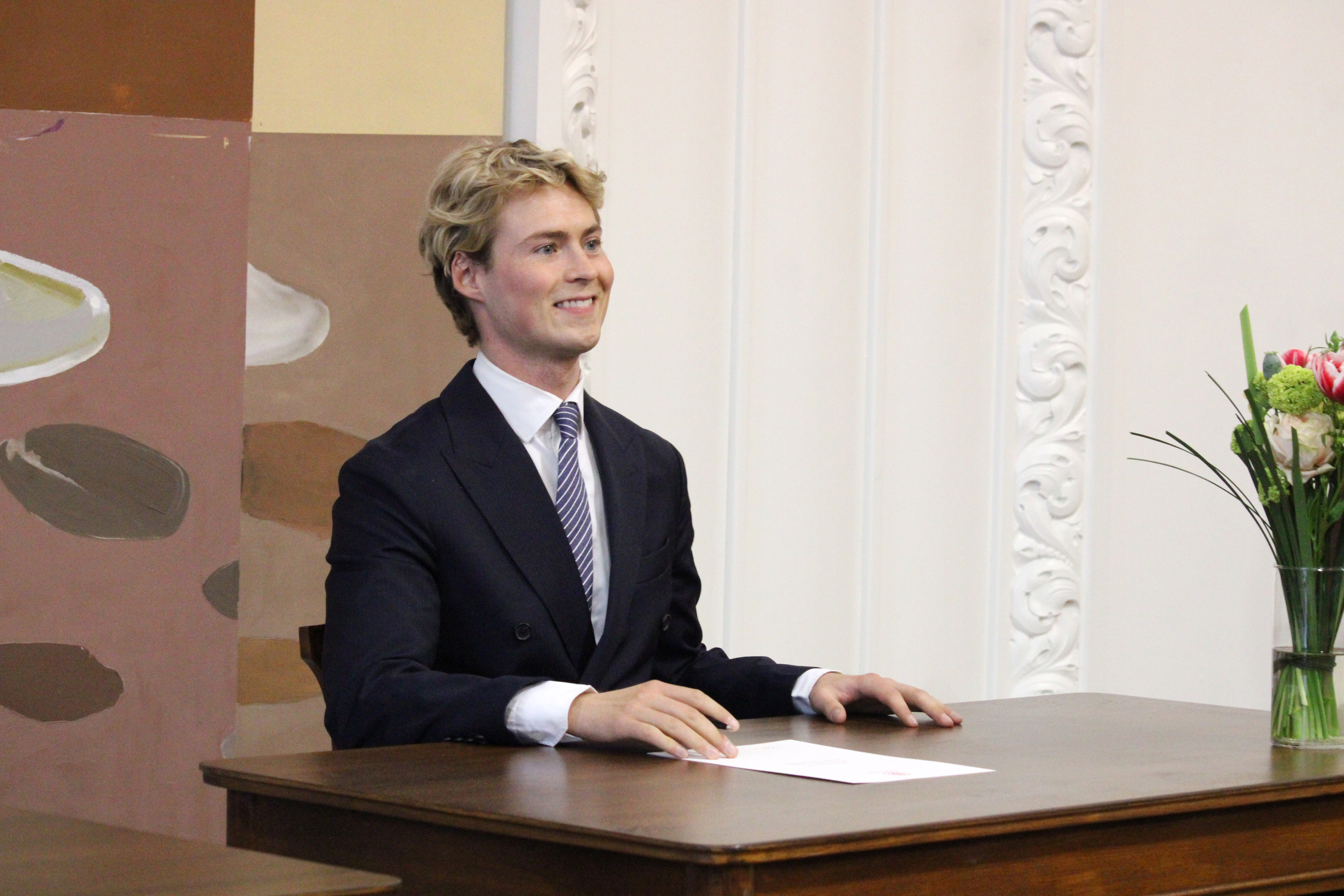
Strange signing a pledge to uphold the Danish Constitution at Christiansborg, 14 April 2026
