= Christian Vigilius =

Danish politician (born 1998)

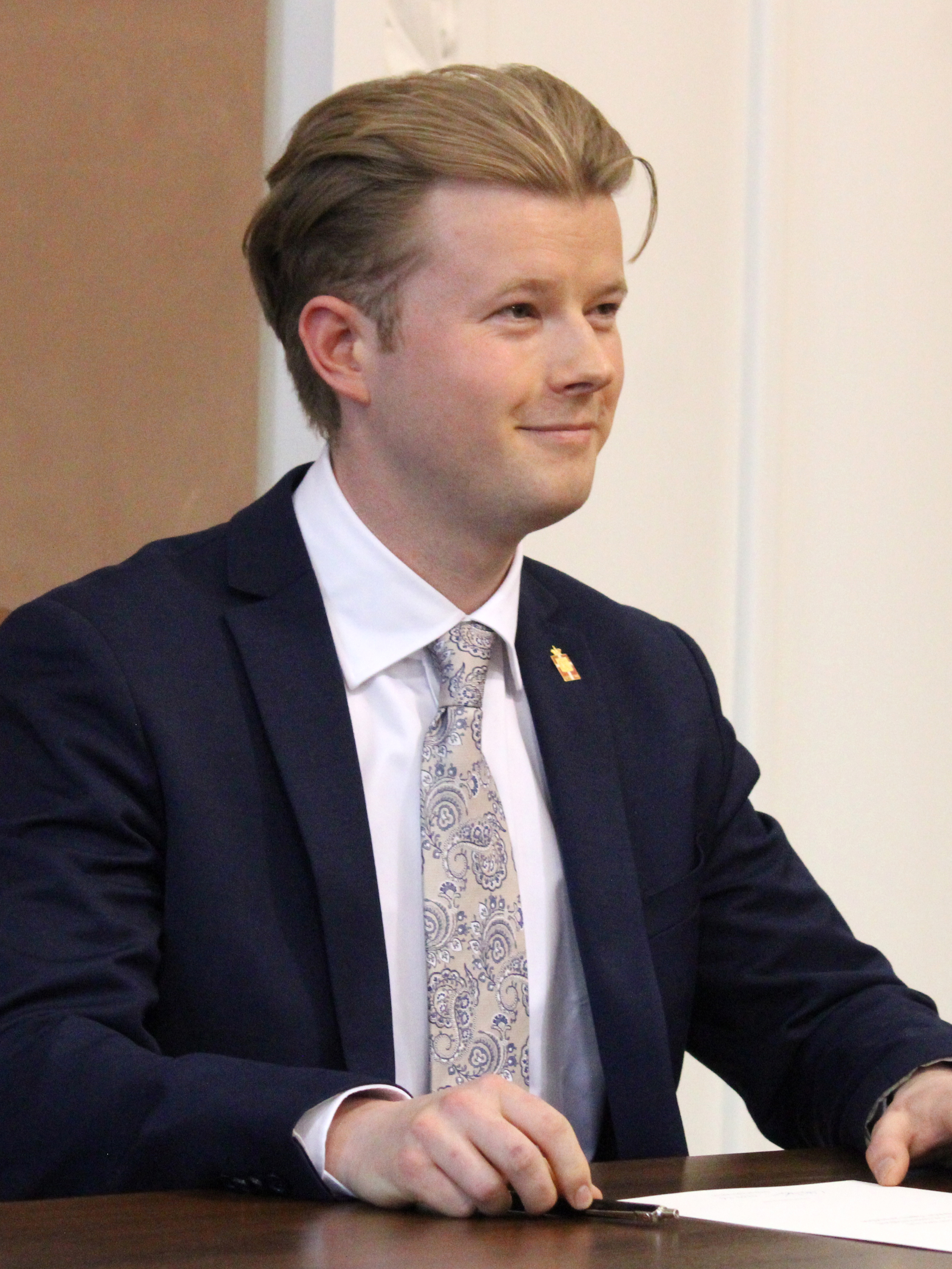
- Vigilius in 2026

Member of the Folketing
- Incumbent
- Assumed office 24 March 2026
- Constituency: Greater Copenhagen

Personal details
- Born: 23 July 1998 (age 27)
- Party: Conservative People's Party

Christian Holst Vigilius (born 23 July 1998) is a Danish politician serving as a member of the Folketing since 2026. From 2022 to 2025, he served as chairman of the Young Conservatives. From 2020 to 2022, he served as chairman of Conservative Students.
