= Regional Representation of the European Commission in Bonn =

Coordinates: 50.7372°N 7.1018°E

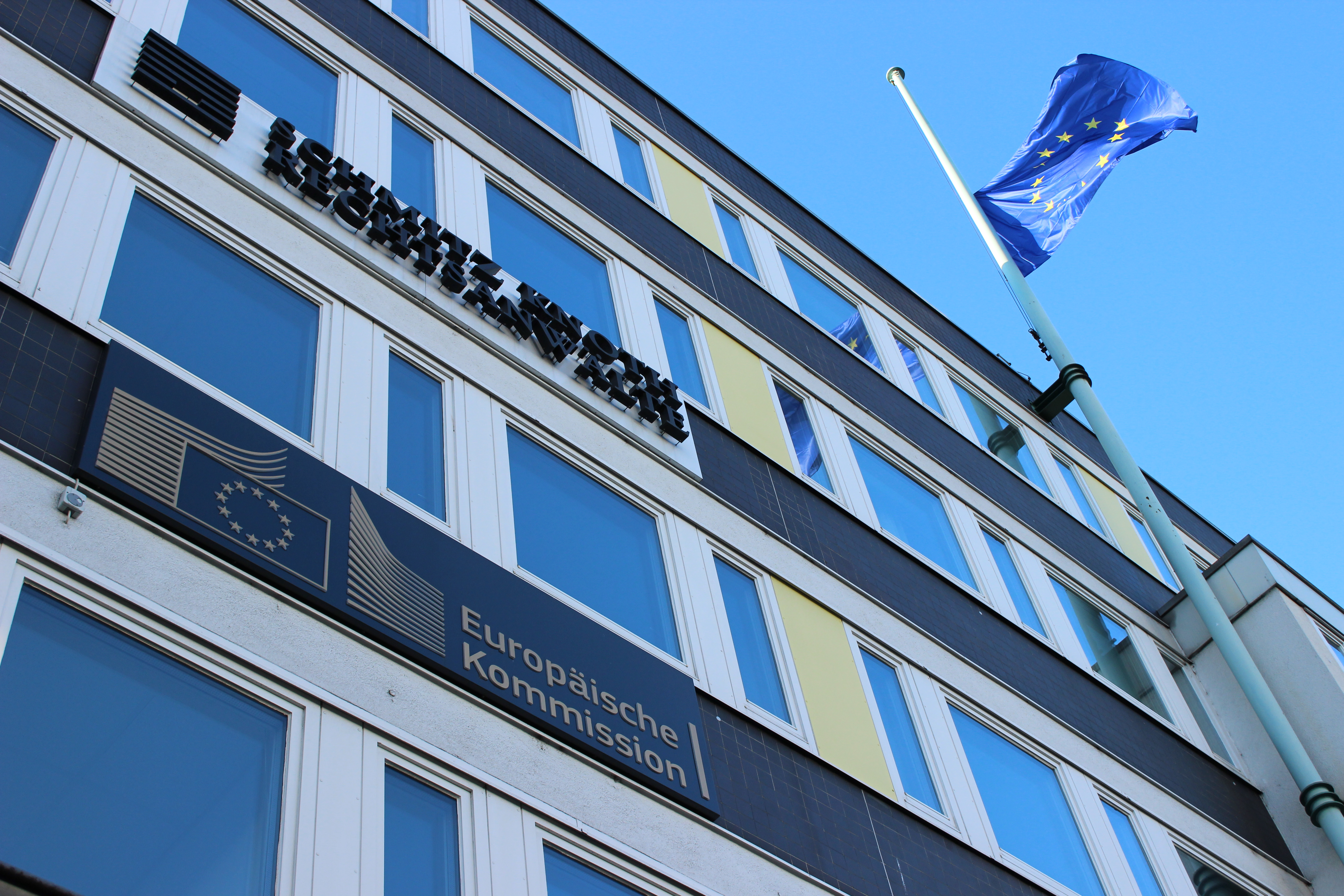
Regional representation of the European Commission in Bonn, Bertha-von-Suttner-Platz 2-4

The regional representation of the European Commission in Bonn is part of the Commission representation in Germany. The main office is located in Berlin and another regional representation is in Munich.

== History ==
The regional representation office has its origin as press liaison office of the European Coal and Steel Community, which was located in Luxembourg. The office in Bonn opened on 1 March 1954 as the very first branch office of the European institutions in Schulze-Delitzsch-Haus (Bonn), directed by the journalist Dr. Karl Mühlenbach. The next branches were opened in Rome and Paris The main task of the press liaison office was to maintain and strengthen contact to the press and other national sources of information.

== Present function and tasks ==
The regional representation still serves as a link between the European Commission and the public. It is responsible for North Rhine-Westphalia, Rhineland-Palatinate, Hesse and Saarland, which contains almost 30 million EU citizens.

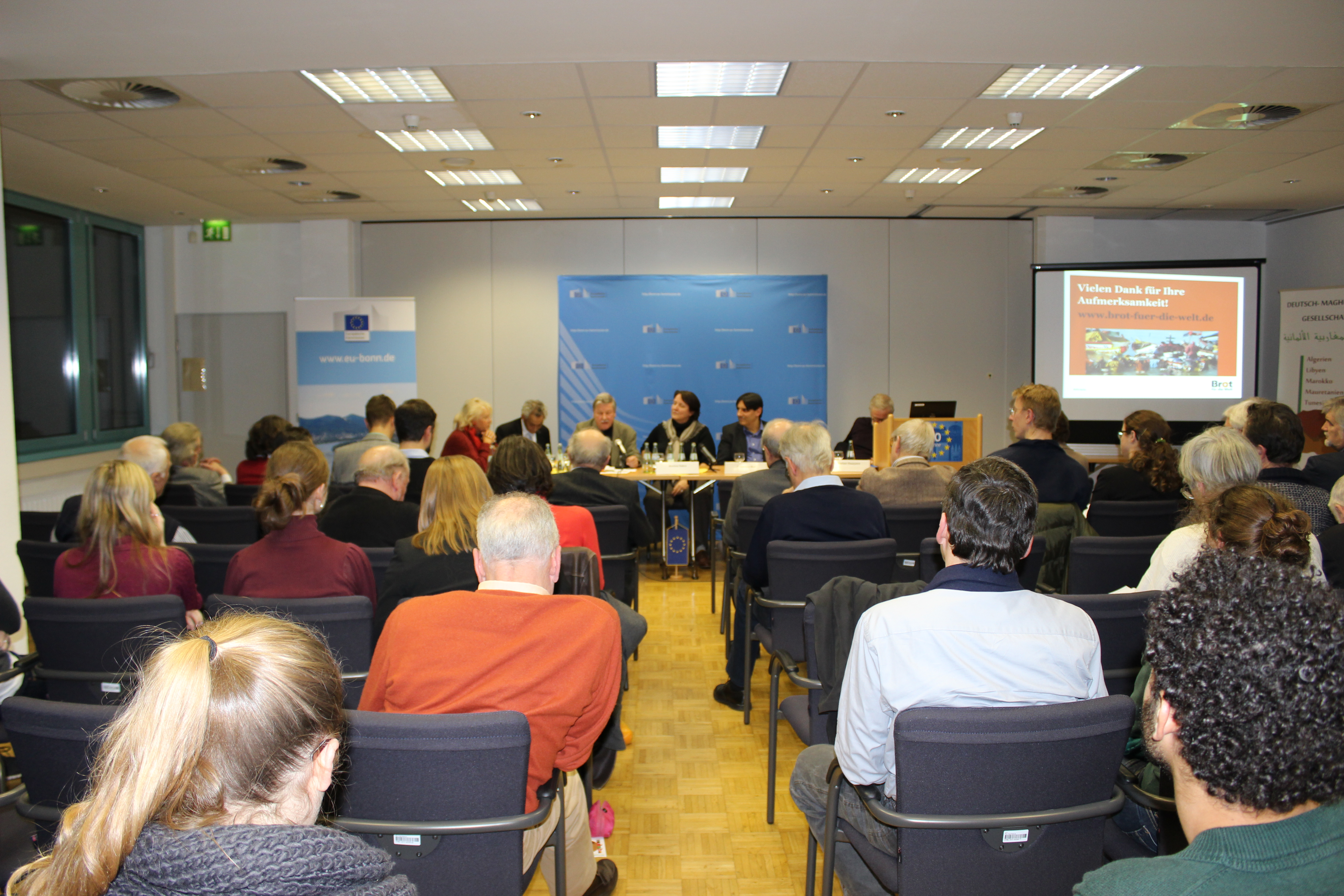
Event EU-Fishing policy in North Africa

== Focus on media relations ==
Relationship with media enjoys a very high priority. The office, for example, does organise visits for journalist groups to the European Commission and other EU-institutions in Brussels or other EU supported projects in the region. In addition, seminars, visits in the editorial office as well as interviews and mediations are part of the tasks.

== Strategic partnerships ==
On the political level, the focus is on strategic partnerships with the government of the four federal states. These partnerships enabled organising numerous projects together with the local and regional public administration to promote the idea of Europe in the general public. The cooperation with the municipalities and state parliaments are being gradually extended. In addition, the regional representation cooperates with partner organisations to host Europe related events, which are relevant for the region.

In 2013, the federal state parliament accepted a proposal of all parties to establish an information office of the European Parliament in Bonn.

== EU-information network ==
The regional representation in Bonn works closely with the information network supported by the European Commission in its area of responsibility. It takes part in events and regularly organises regional network meetings. This includes the Europe Direct information centres, the Team Europe, the Enterprise Europe Network as well as the European Documentation Centre.

== Young European Professionals (YEP) ==
The YEPs are a permanent mutual project of the Federal Agency for Civic Education (bpb) and the regional representation of the European Commission in Bonn. It consists of young people who are interested in Europe-related topics and want to share their knowledge to other young people in an interactive and interesting way.
