= Jürgen Hardt =

German politician (born 1963)

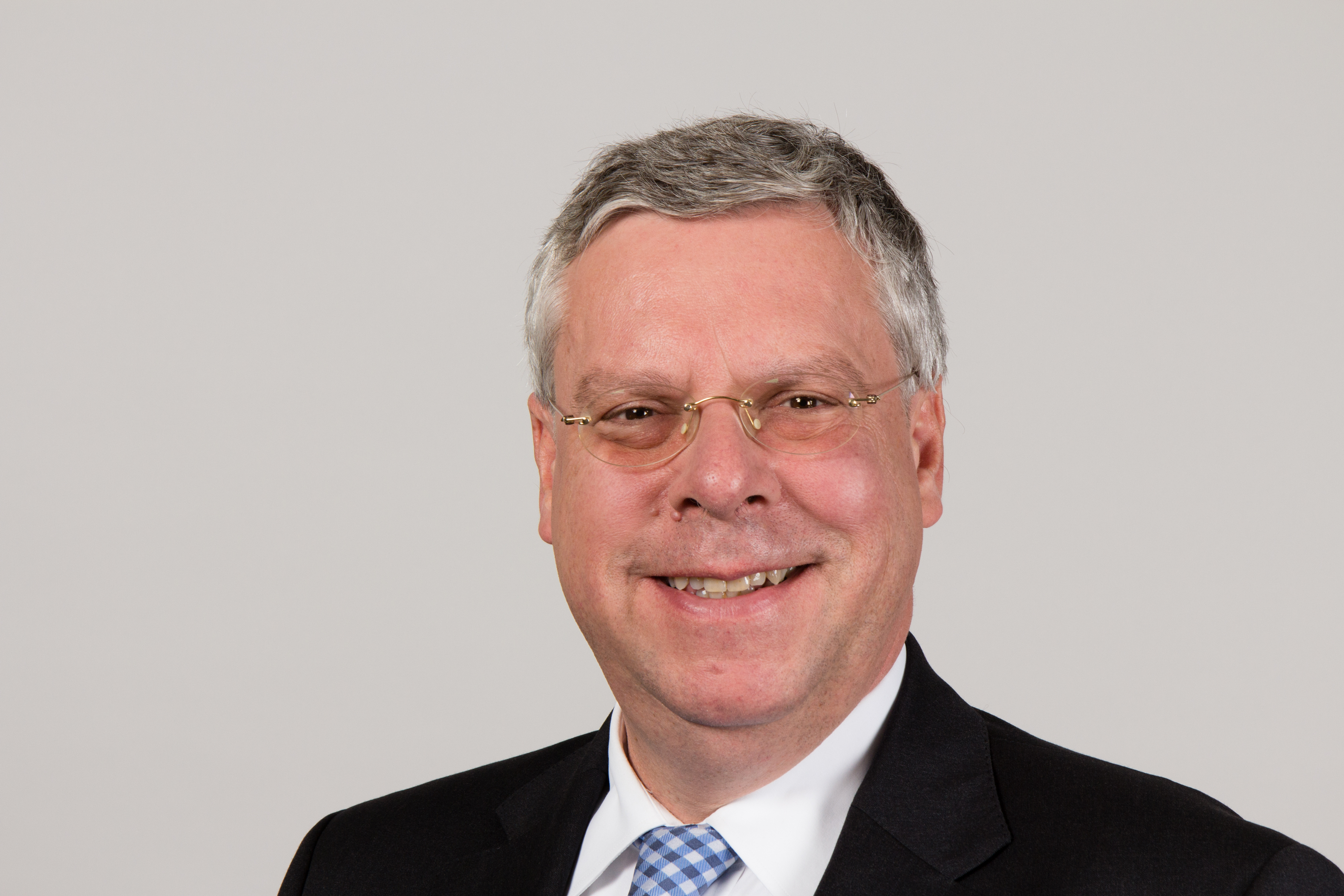
- Hardt in 2014

Member of the Bundestag
- Incumbent
- Assumed office 27 October 2009

Personal details
- Born: 30 May 1963 (age 63) Hofheim am Taunus, Hesse, West Germany (current-day Germany)
- Party: Christian Democratic Union

Jürgen Hardt (born 30 May 1963) is a German politician of the Christian Democratic Union (CDU) who has served as a member of the Bundestag since 2009.

== Early life and career ==
After obtaining Abitur 1982 in Königstein im Taunus, Hardt served as a naval officer in the Bundeswehr for four years and studied economics in Heidelberg and Cologne from 1986 to 1993.

From 1992 to 2001 Hardt worked for the federal office of the Christian Democratic Union (CDU) and for the CDU/CSU parliamentary group in the Bundestag, including as head of the office of Peter Hintze, the CDU Secretary-General, from 1995 to 1998. From 2001 to 2009 he was a senior manager at household appliances company Vorwerk in Wuppertal. As head of corporate communications at Vorwerk he won the German Public Relations Prize in 2005.

== Political career ==
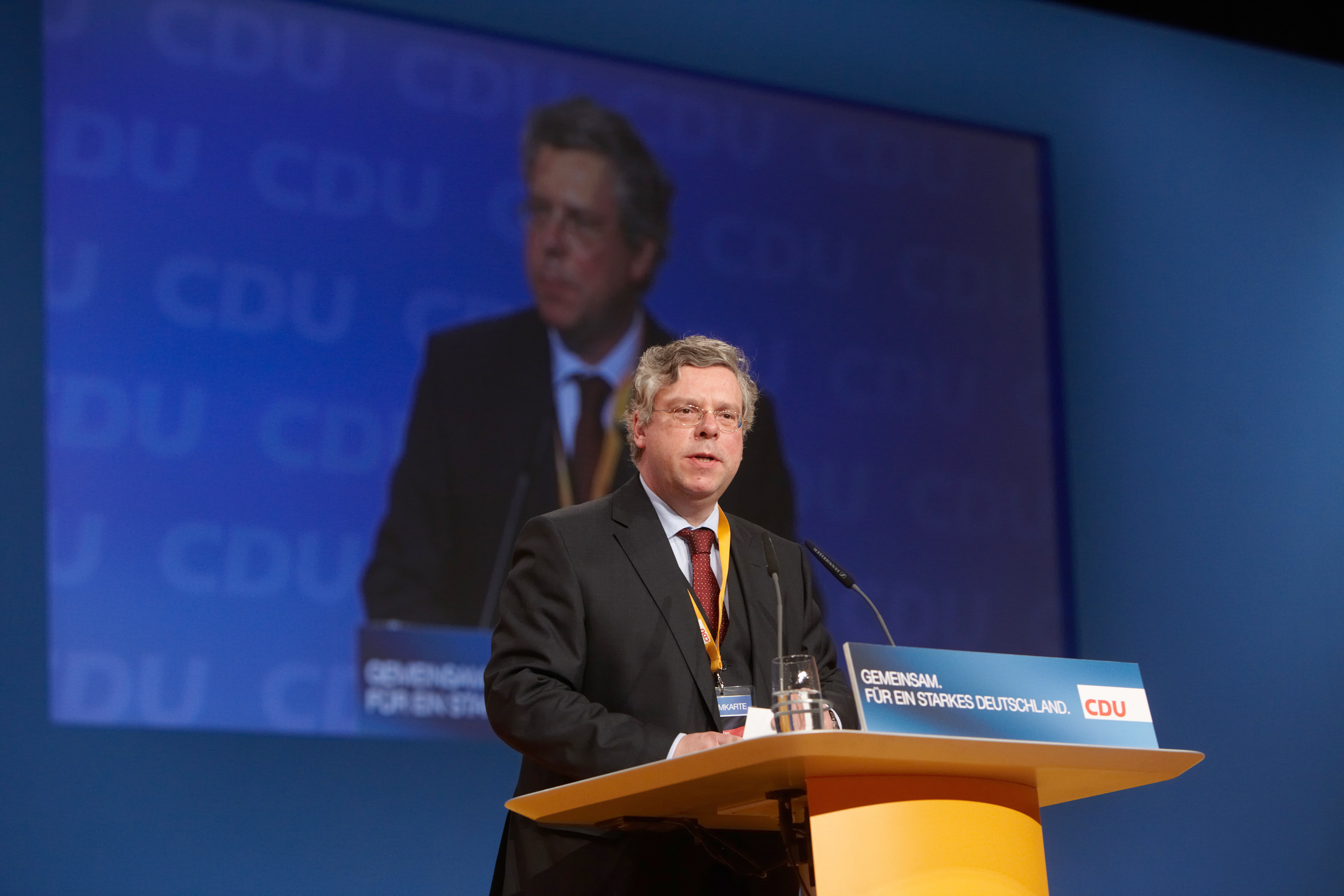
At the convention of the CDU at 15 November 2010 in Karlsruhe

Jürgen Hardt joined the CDU in 1981. On the national level, he was federal chairman of the Association of Christian Democratic Students (RCDS) from 1987 to 1989. From 2004 to 2009 he served as a member of Wuppertal's city council and chaired the council's committee on economic affairs.

Since 2003 Hardt has been serving as chairman of the Wuppertal county branch of the CDU and since 2005 deputy chairman of the Bergisches Land district branch of the CDU.

=== Member of the Bundestag ===
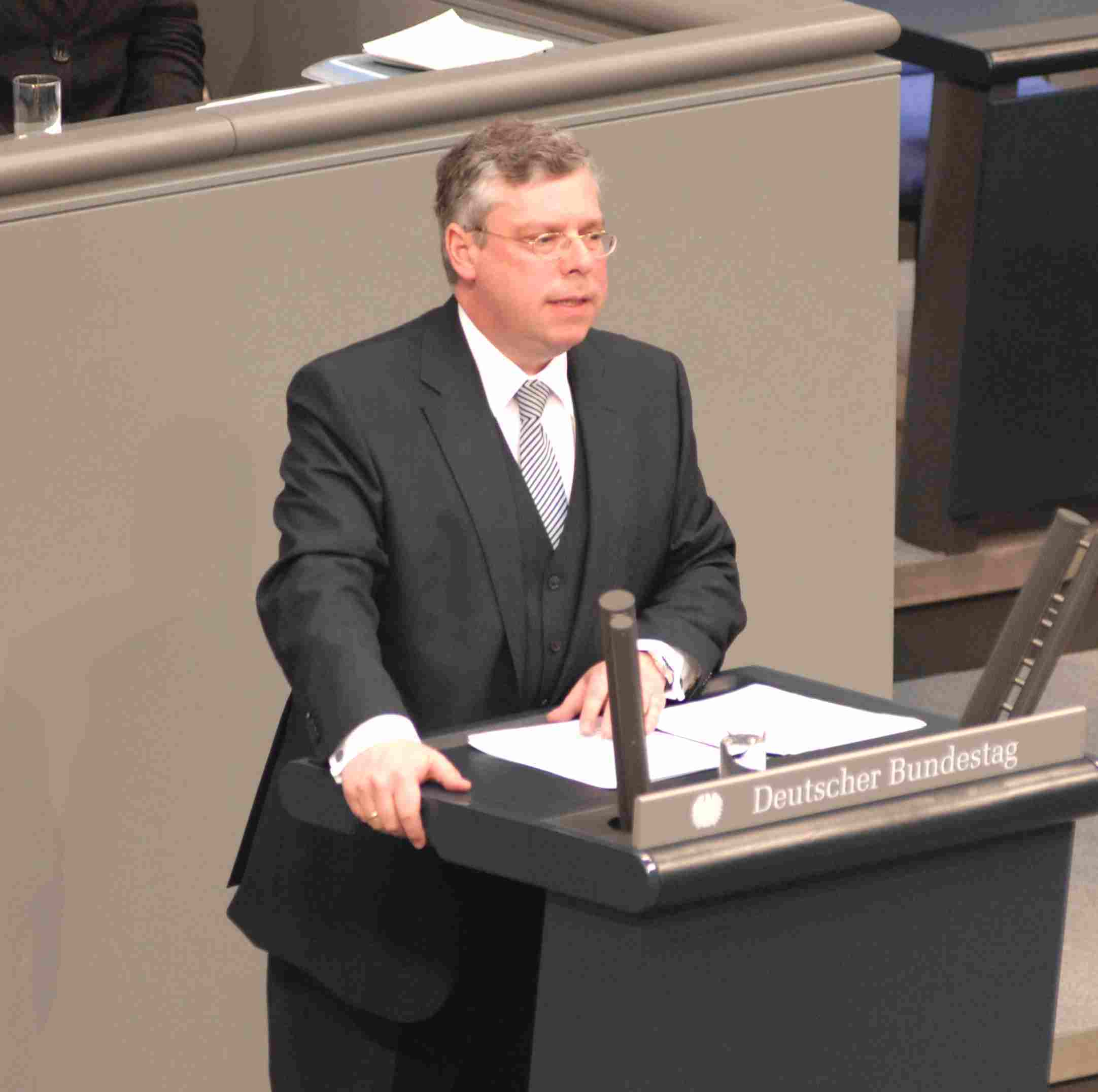
During his first speech in the German Bundestag on 26 February 2010

Hardt was first elected to the Bundestag in the 2009 federal election, representing Solingen – Remscheid – Wuppertal II. He served on the Defense Committee (Verteidigungsausschuss) and the Committee on the Affairs of the European Union between 2009 and 2015 before moving to the Committee on Foreign Affairs.

In addition to his committee assignments, Hardt was a member of the German-Israeli Parliamentary Friendship Group and of the German delegation to the NATO Parliamentary Assembly. He was also a substitute member of the German delegation to the Parliamentary Assembly of the Council of Europe (PACE) from 2014 until 2021, where he served on the Committee on Political Affairs and Democracy (2016–2021), the Sub-Committee on External Relations (2018–2021) and Sub-Committee on Culture, Diversity and Heritage (2014–2015).

In April 2014, Hardt succeeded Philipp Mißfelder as Coordinator of Transatlantic Cooperation at the Federal Foreign Office in the third cabinet of Chancellor Angela Merkel, an office he held until April 2018. Following Mißfelder’s death in July 2015, he also took over as foreign policy spokesperson of the CDU/CSU parliamentary group and has held this position ever since (as of December 2025). In the negotiations to form a coalition government under the leadership of Chancellor Angela Merkel following the 2017 federal elections, he was part of the working group on foreign policy, led by Ursula von der Leyen, Gerd Müller and Sigmar Gabriel. Between 2014 and 2018 Hardt was the government's coordinator for transatlantic cooperation at the Federal Foreign Office. He lost his direct mandate in 2021 German federal election and gained a Bundestag seat via the party list.

In the 20. legislative period he served on the Committee on Foreign Affairs and as deputy on the Committee on the Affairs of the European Union (Ausschuss für die Angelegenheiten der Europäischen Union) as well as the Sub-Committee on the United Nations, International Organizations and Civil Crisis Prevention.

== Other activities ==
- German Israel Association, Member of the Board (since 2022)
- German Institute for International and Security Affairs (SWP), Member of the Council
- German Council on Foreign Relations (DGAP), Member of the Steering Committee

== Political positions ==
In June 2017, Hardt voted against naming same-sex civil unions marriages. same-sex marriage. Ahead of the Christian Democrats’ leadership election in 2018, he publicly endorsed Annegret Kramp-Karrenbauer to succeed Angela Merkel as the party’s chair.

When German federal prosecutors accused the Russian government in 2020 of ordering the killing of a former Chechen rebel in Berlin and indicted a Russian man for the murder, Hardt called for further sanctions against Russia.

Ever since the Russian invasion in Ukraine Jürgen Hardt has demanded the delivery of heavy weapons to the Ukrainian government. Prior to the invasion, he was in favour of equipping the Ukrainian military with defensive weapons and a more decisive stance against Russia's aggression.
