= Thomas Uhlen =

German politician (born 1985)

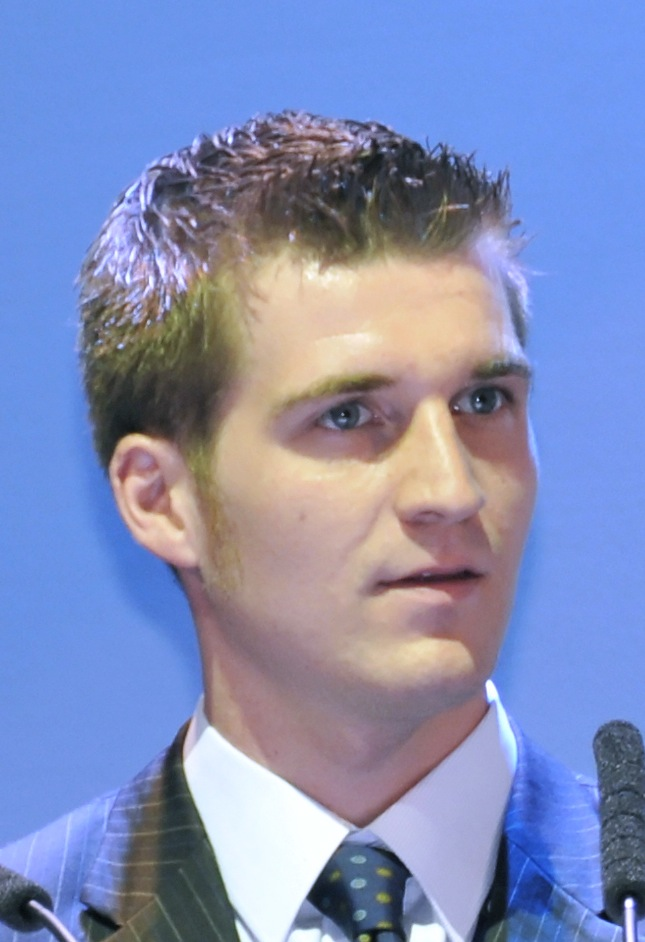
- Uhlen in 2009

Member of the Landtag of Lower Saxony
- Incumbent
- Assumed office 8 November 2022
- Preceded by: Gerda Hövel
- Constituency: Melle

Personal details
- Born: 25 July 1985 (age 40)
- Party: Christian Democratic Union

Thomas Uhlen (born 25 July 1985) is a German politician of the Christian Democratic Union. In the 2022 Lower Saxony state election, he was elected member of the Landtag of Lower Saxony. From 2008 to 2009, he was the chairman of European Democrat Students. From 2011 to 2016, he was a member of the Kreistag of Osnabrück. Since 2021, he has served as mayor of Lockhausen and as a member of the Bad Essen municipal council.
