= Conservative Students (Denmark) =

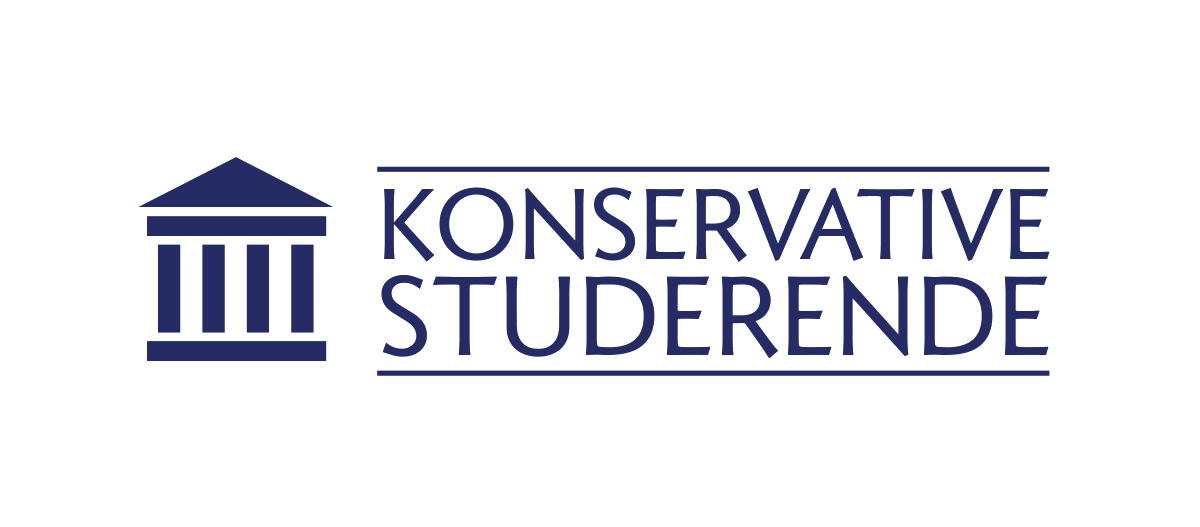
- Abbreviation: KS
- Formation: 1964
- Members: 500+
- Chairman: Andreas Lee
- Vice Chairman: Helene Fagerhøj
- General Secretary: Kaj Oldenburg
- Affiliations: Centre-Right European Association of Students (CREAS)
- Website: ks.dk

Conservative Students (KS) is a centre-right student organization in Denmark.

== Origins ==
Conservative Students originally emerged within the Student Association in Copenhagen and was formally founded in Copenhagen on 16 May 1903 under the name "The Conservative Voter Association in the Student Association" as a faction affiliated with the political party Højre (The Right).

In the spring of 1909, it was established as an independent association under the name "The Student Association's Conservatives". Over time, this Copenhagen organization became known as "Conservative Students". The Copenhagen association was an important player in the student community of the capital and supplied the Conservative People's Party with political figures such as Aage Kidde, John Christmas Møller, Ole Bjørn Kraft, Aksel Møller, Per Stig Møller and others.

On 4 September 1934, a similar student association was established at Aarhus University, following the Copenhagen model, and also adopted the name Conservative Students. However, it took many years before the Aarhus association reached a comparable size, and in the absence of a formalized collaboration, the Copenhagen association set the tone. The Copenhagen branch later became known as "Conservative Students in the Capital", while the Aarhus branch retained the name Conservative Students. Today, the designation Conservative Students refers exclusively to the association at Aarhus University.

== National Organization of Conservative Students ==
In 1964, the Copenhagen and Aarhus KS associations merged to form the National Organization of Conservative Students. The association is entirely independent and is therefore not subordinate to the Conservative People's Party or its sister organization Young Conservatives. The national organization later changed its name to Denmark's Conservative Students (DKS), and in 2011 it was renamed the National Organization of Conservative Students (KSL). In everyday use, the organization is simply referred to as Conservative Students or KS.

Today, Conservative Students is a broad centre-right student organization, and as the only centre-right student organization in Denmark, it also includes members who are not formally affiliated with any political party. Its highest authority is the National Council (landsrådet), which meets annually in October and elects the executive committee.

KS is also heavily engaged in international work and is a member of the Nordic Conservative Student Union (NKSU) and the European Democrat Students (EDS).

== Member associations ==
The organization has local branches at all Danish universities except the IT University of Copenhagen, and is thus represented at Aarhus, Odense, Roskilde, Copenhagen, Aalborg, Lyngby-Taarbæk and Frederiksberg.

=== Conservative Students at Copenhagen Business School ===
Conservative Students is the cross-centre-right student association at Copenhagen Business School. The international name of the association is CBS Conservative & Liberal Students. It is driven by a new generation of young, ambitious students at Copenhagen Business School.

=== Conservative Students at the University of Copenhagen ===
In 1989, the entire Copenhagen association (Conservative Students in the Capital) was collectively expelled from the national organization. Instead, the Copenhagen Conservative Student Forum was established by Lars William Hansen and Filip Sundram.

=== Conservative Students at the Technical University of Denmark ===
The DTU branch was founded in 2019 with the purpose of promoting conservative student politics at the Technical University of Denmark.

== Leadership over time ==
Chairs of Conservative Students at Copenhagen Business School

Name	Assumed office	Left office
Kasper Jensen	2020	2022
Casper Øhlers	2022	2023
Luna Solhave	2023	Current

Chairs of The Conservative Voter Association in the Student Association / The Student Association's Conservatives / Conservative Students / Conservative Students in the Capital (incomplete):

- 1903–19?? Otto Jensen
- 1909–19?? Ejnar Hansen
- Aage Kidde
- 19??–ca. 1920 John Christmas Møller
- ca. 1920–1926 Carsten Raft
- 1926–1931 Aksel Møller

...

- 19??–1939 William Schack Nielsen
- 1939–1942 Poul Møller
- 1942–1945 Erik Ninn-Hansen
- 1945 Leif Nellemose
- 1945–19?? Kai Engell Jensen
- 19??–1947 Kristian Mogensen
- 19??–1951 Erik Andersen
- 1951–19?? Ole Stæhr
- ca. 1952 Flemming Hasle
- ca. 1952 Wilhelm Christmas-Møller

...

- .... Viggo Fischer

...

- 1971–1972 Peter La Cour

...

- 1981–1982 Connie Hedegaard
- 1982–1983 Hans Bech
- 1982–1986 Jens Frederik Hansen
- 1986–1988 Peter Kurrild-Klitgaard
- 1988–1989 Søren Agerbo
- 1989– Finn Ziegler

Chairs of Conservative Students at the University of Copenhagen (incomplete):

- 1990–1991 Lars William Hansen
- 1991–1993 Filip Sundram

...

- 2002–2004 Kristian Kolind
- 2004–2007 Carina Munck Olsén
- 2007–2008 Lisa Mette Tønder
- 2008–2009 Claus Christiansen
- 2009–2011 Lisa Mette Tønder
- 2011–2014 Andreas Johannes Teckemeier
- 2014–2015 Phillip Giede Bøvig
- 2015–2016 Cathrine Wenzzel
- 2016–2016 Anne Birk Mortensen
- 2016–2017 Sarah Marie Dahl
- 2017–2019 Andreas Vindstrup Fjeldsted
- 2019–2020 Simon Lindkær Andersen
- 2020–2021 Cille Hald Egholm
- 2021–present Mads Strange

Chairs of The Student Association's Conservatives / Conservative Students (Aarhus) (incomplete):

- 1967–1969 Lars P. Gammelgaard
- 1984–1984 John Amund Andersen
- 1993–1994 Søren Flinch Midtgaard
- 20??–2013 Rasmus Pedersen
- 2013–2015 Hans Henrik Juhl
- 2015–2016 Anders Staunsbjerg Brogner
- 2016–2017 Henrik Dahlin
- 2017–2020 Kim Risbjerg Madsen
- 2020–2023 Matias Tidemand Sørensen
- 2023–present Max Manøe Bjerregaard

Chairs of the National Organization of Conservative Students / National Organization of Conservative Students (from 1964) (incomplete):

- – 1939/1940 Jørgen Hatting
- 1939/1940 (approx.) – ?? Poul Meyer
- Hagen Hagensen
- –1947 Erik Ninn-Hansen
- 1947– Kristian Mogensen
- 1964–1967 Jens Jørgensen
- 1967–1970 Harald Rømer
- 1970–1973 Finn Brogaard
- 1973–1976 Peter Stub Jørgensen
- 1976–1980 ?
- 1980–1982 Christian Mallet
- 1982–1984 Connie Hedegaard
- 1984–1986 Christian Høm
- 1986–1987 Jesper Fabricius
- 1987–1989 Jesper Frank Hansen
- 1989–1992 Steen Michael Asgreen
- 1992–1993 Allan Friis
- 1993–1994 Mads Lebech
- 1994–1995 Søren Flinch Midtgaard
- 1995–1997 Henrik Sørensen
- 1997–1998 Philip Torbøl
- 1998–1999 Bjarke Stilling
- 1999–2000 Dan Christiansen
- 2000–2001 Lasse Bork Schmidt
- 2001–2002 Jonas Wilstrup
- 2002–2004 Christian Hejlesen
- 2004–2005 Martin Christiansen
- 2005–2007 Anne Marie Lei
- 2007–2009 Katrine Hovaldt Larsen
- 2009–2012 Nicolaj Bang
- 2012–2014 Maria Svejdal
- 2014–2015 Andreas Johannes Teckemeier
- 2015–2016 Mikkel Wrang
- 2016–2017 Anne Birk Mortensen
- 2017–2018 Magnus Hermann Haraldsson
- 2018–2020 Kim Risbjerg Madsen
- 2020–2020 Andreas Schou
- 2020–2022 Christian Holst Vigilius
- 2022–2023 Magnus Von Dreiager
- 2023–2025 Daniel Bekesi
- 2025–2026 Johannes Kristensen
- 2026–present Andreas Lee
