= Liberal Student Clubs (Romania) =

The Liberal Student Clubs (Romanian: Cluburile Studenţeşti Liberale, CSL) are the student organisations of the National Liberal Party (PNL) of Romania. They have representation at the national level, National Coordinating Office, president Radu Surugiu, CSL organisations are found in all university cities (centre universitare) like Timișoara, Iaşi, Cluj-Napoca, Pitești, and Bucharest.
