= Association of Christian Democratic Students =

Association of Christian Democratic Students Ring Christlich-Demokratischer Studenten (RCDS)
- President: Lukas Honemann
- European affiliation: Centre-Right European Association of Students
- Website: Official website

The Association of Christian Democratic Students (German: Ring Christlich-Demokratischer Studenten, RCDS) is a German student organisation founded in 1951 and based in Berlin. It contains more than 100 groups at universities with 8,000 members in total. The RCDS is the largest and oldest existing political student association in Germany. It sees itself as a liberal and conservative student association.

The organisation stands politically near the Christian Democratic Union and Christian Social Union, two conservative German political parties. It is one of nine founding members of the Centre Right European Association for Students, which was established on the 23rd of July 2022 amongst organisations such as AktionsGemeinschaft, Fria Moderata Studentförbundet of Blasieholmsgatan and Høyres Studenter.

== Content ==
The work field primarily important for the RCDS is university policies: promoting the students self administration and working towards a responsible distribution of financial means of universities is a main aim. As education is the most important trait people can accomplish, the RCDS promotes exchanges of university places and makes access available to book and internship markets. Moreover, the RCDS regularly informs students about important information such as how to apply for BAföG or a stipend as well as how to spend a semester or the whole course of studies abroad.

=== Values ===
The values of the RCDS are based on the inviolable, inalienable human dignity. Given this foundation, the RCDS supports liberty, justice, responsibility, tolerance and efficiency. The RCDS is joinable for every university student that represents himself supportive of the Liberal Democratic Basic Order, the idea of the Christian conception of mankind and the above-mentioned.

=== Society, Europe and Commitment ===
The RCDS supports the idea of a society in which people have the opportunity to free self-actualization and with that the chance of an active, social commitment to the community and overall society. The RCDS as an organization commits itself to the European maxim United in Diversity. The RCDS pleads for pan-European studying as well as for the European Higher Education Area.

=== Social Market Economy ===
The RCDS supports the social market economy in which the country should serve a competitive environment. For the enhancement of universities this means that the state should provide every university with adequate financial means because every university place is a positive investment in the future development of Germany and Europe.

=== Education, Sciences and Academic Research ===
Everyone has the right of education and everyone needs to have access to educational institutions such as the university. Through education every person is able to recognize their personal skills and liberties and with that be encouraged in taking personal and social responsibility within society. For that the RCDS places itself particularly against any interventions into sciences, research and teaching. Furthermore, the association strictly refuses the Civil Clause and ever again points out the major importance of liberty of sciences, research and teachings at German universities.

=== Academic Studies at a University ===
The opportunity of studying at a university should be declined for nobody because of a lack of financial means. Every person should be able to study at a university and recuperate an academic title. The centralization of the allocation of places in higher education is not promoted by the RCDS as universities should be at liberty also in the choice of students for their particular university or faculty. The RCDS strongly recommends the self-government of universities and for that supports the idea of a private as well as governmental financing of universities.

=== European Policy Program 2014 ===
In addition to the party platform which was enacted in 2013, the RCDS adopted their European policy program one year later in 2014. The program strictly claims the sustainable promotion of European education areas as well as the enhancement of the ERASMUS program becoming ERASMUS+. Furthermore, the introduction of an ERASMUS loan is demanded. By the afore mentioned means the mobility of students and trainees within Europe should be increased. To support foreign students in Germany it would be advantageous to upgrade the typical orientation weeks at universities, expand the so-called "Buddy-Programs" as well as the general offer of foreign language courses at universities.

== Organizational structure ==
Unlike the Young Union which is a political association that belongs to the CDU/ CSU, the RCDS has the status of an allied organization and is therefore institutionally independent. The majority of the RCDS group chairmen as well as regional and federal chairmen are co-opted members from the executive boards of the CDU and the CSU on the respective organizational levels. Hence, the RCDS effectively grants the right to have a say in a matter in a similar fashion as the Young Union.

The federal association conciliates the work of the groups and is responsible for expressing student interests on the federal policy level. Furthermore, the federal association organizes seminars, congresses and other events. It also initiates

nationwide actions and campaigns and publishes information documents and engages with subjects that are essential to the RCDS. The federal association is represented both internally and externally by an executive board consisting of three members which is elected for a year by the assembly of national delegates. Thereby, the federal association receives support from up to four elected assessors as well as through the advisory council and if applicable through a committee of experts and other specialists.

The alumni of the RCDS find themselves in the Association of Christian Democratic Academics (RCDA). The federal association of the RCDA has been founded in 1991 on the occasion of the 40th anniversary of the RCDS. Though, some isolated local RCDA groups such as in Göttingen have been around for much longer. The association is currently being led by a federal board consisting of four members.

== History ==
The first RCDS Federation was founded in the course of the first Federal Delegate Conference 1951 in Bonn. However, the first Christian democratic university groups (German: christlich demokratische Hochschulgruppen, CDH) already emerged shortly after the Second World War. At first they were mostly focussed on the Sowjet Occupation Zone (German: Sowjetische Besatzungszone), where they became a major force of resistance against the Socialist Unity Party of Germany. Many Christian democratic student representatives just as Werner Neumann (1946), Georg Wrazidlo (1947) or Hanns Beitz (1948) got arbitrarily arrested.

After the student councils got abolished in the GDR (German: DDR) and the Free German Youth got elected as the exclusive representation of interests, the CDH university groups relocated their main field of work in centering on the Federal Republic of Germany and the city of Berlin. Many of the activists that were forced to shun the Sowjet Occupation Zone or the GDR established new university groups in the west of Germany which incorporated themselves since 1951 being the Association of Christian Democratic Students.

However, at universities of West Germany the RCDS at first had no major influence as doing "party politics" was dispraised. Furthermore, their main electorate was

primarily represented by conservative and mostly catholic members of German fraternity associations, religious student communities such as the KDSE (German: Katholische Deutsche Studenteneinigung) or independent student council representatives. With the beginning of the 1960s the RCDS was able to encourage their posture within the student parliament. However, due to a student movement the RCDS was despised ever again.

Only with the beginning of the 1990s the RCDS got a chance of rising as student representatives again because former dominating politically left oriented student associations (German: MSB; SHB; RSG) collapsed. In the pivotal year of 1990 the RCDS began founding university groups in the new states of Germany as well.

In April 2008 the RCDS established the so-called "Hochschulallianz" in conjunction with other university organizations. The main purpose of that alliance is to construct a collective representation of interests between lecturers and learners compared with politics and to plead for the interests of sciences.

== Notable chairmen ==
- Fritz Flick and Ernst Benda, 1951–1952
- Gerd Langguth, 1970–1974
- Friedbert Pflüger, 1977–1978
- Jürgen Hardt, 1987–1989
