= Nike Örbrink =

Swedish politician (born 1997)

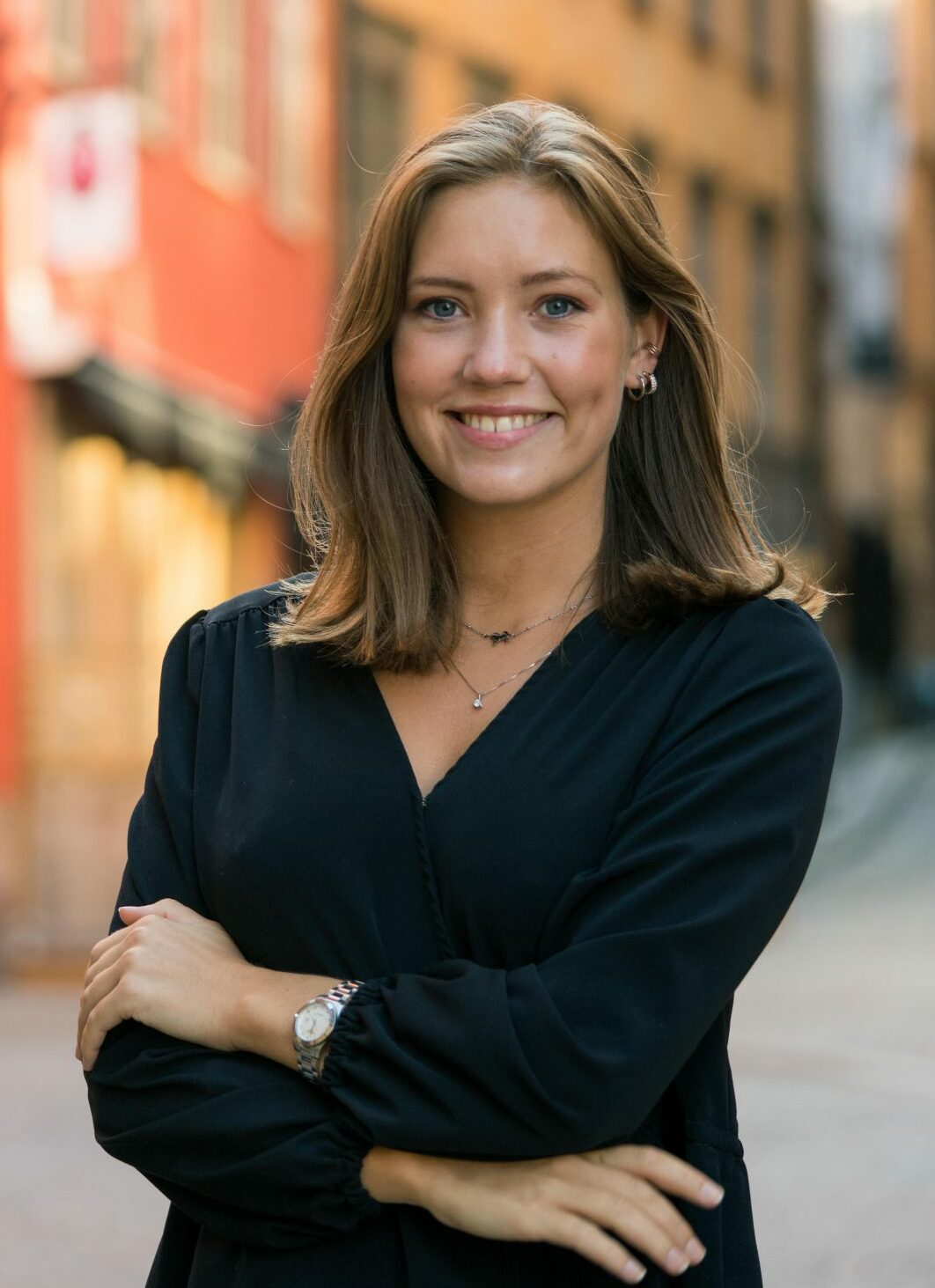
- Örbrink in 2019

Member of the Riksdag
- In office 18 October 2022 – 7 November 2022
- Preceded by: Jakob Forssmed
- Succeeded by: Jakob Forssmed
- Constituency: Stockholm County

Chairman of the Young Christian Democrats
- In office 8 August 2020 – 20 May 2023
- Preceded by: Martin Hallander
- Succeeded by: Stefan Sarmes

Personal details
- Born: Karin Rebecka Benedikta Örbrink; 1 February 1997 (age 29) Västerled, Stockholm, Sweden
- Party: Christian Democrats

Karin Rebecka "Nike" Benedikta Örbrink (born 1 February 1997) is a Swedish politician of the Christian Democrats.

== Career ==
Örbrink was chairman of the Young Christian Democrats (KDU) from 2020 until 2023. As union chairman of the KDU, she is part of the Christian Democrats' party board.

Örbrink ran in the 2022 parliamentary election and became a substitute Member of the Riksdag in 2022 for the Stockholm County constituency. She served as a substitute for Jakob Forssmed from 18 October until 7 November.

In addition to this, she currently works as a group leader and substitute for the Christian Democrats' municipal board of the city of Stockholm, when she succeeded Erik Slottner on 31 October 2022.
