= Erik Slottner =

Swedish politician (born 1980)

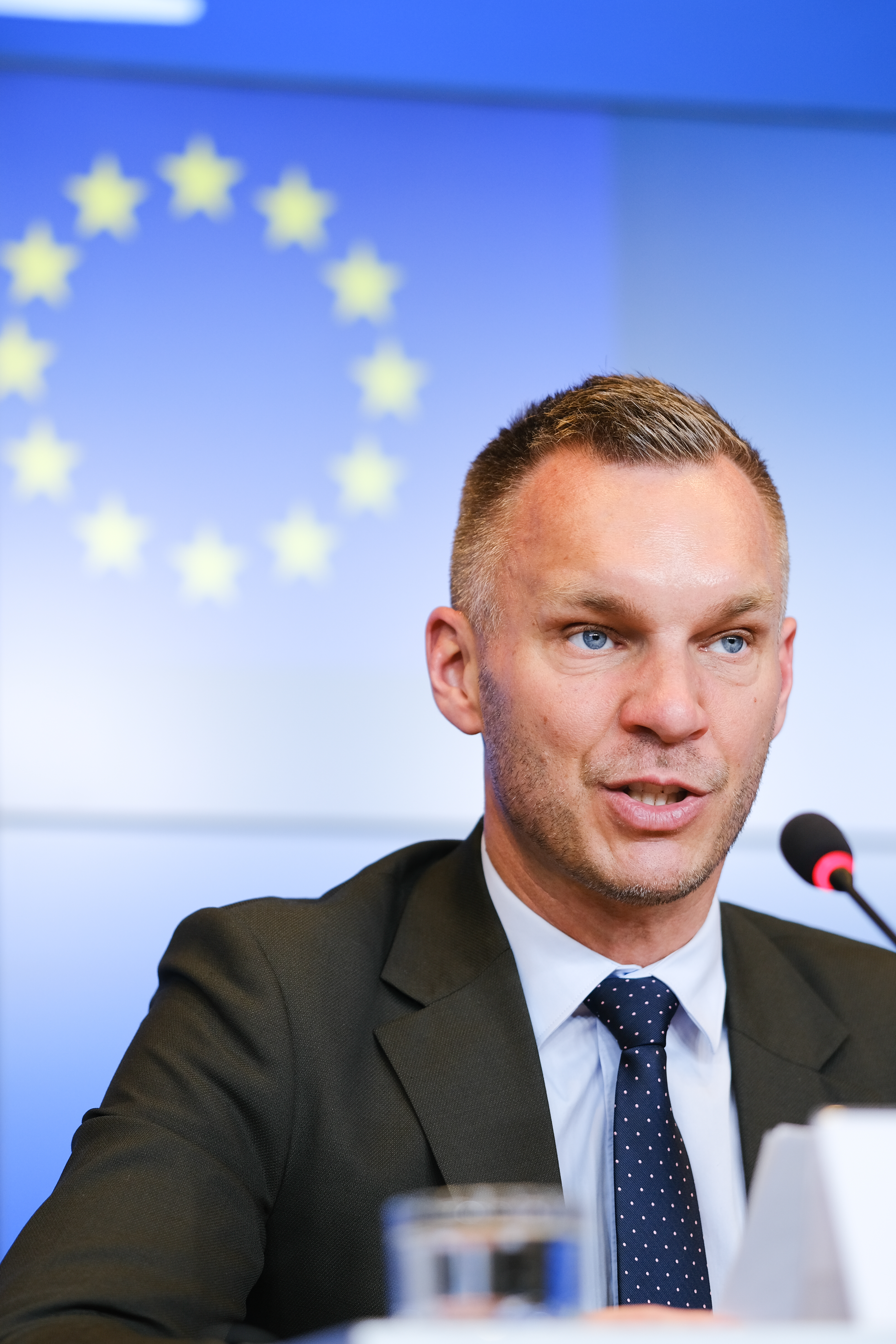
- Slottner in 2023

Minister for Public Administration
- Incumbent
- Assumed office 18 October 2022
- Prime Minister: Ulf Kristersson
- Preceded by: Ida Karkiainen

Member of the Riksdag
- In office 5 February 2018 – 24 September 2018
- Constituency: Stockholm Municipality

Personal details
- Born: 16 April 1980 (age 46) Kalmar, Sweden
- Party: Christian Democrats

Erik Mikael Slottner (born 16 April 1980) is a Swedish politician who serves as Minister for Public Administration in the cabinet of Prime Minister Ulf Kristersson since October 2022. A member of the Christian Democrats, he was a member of the Riksdag in 2018.

Prior to entering the cabinet in 2022, Slottner led the Christian Democrats in the Stockholm City Hall from 2014 to 2022 and was Deputy Mayor of Stockholm for the Elderly and Security from 2018 to 2022. He also served as chairman of the Young Christian Democrats from 2004 to 2005.

Party political offices
Preceded by Jakob Forssmed	Chairman of the Young Christian Democrats; 2004–2005	Succeeded by Ella Bohlin
Preceded by Ewa Samuelsson	Leader of the Christian Democrats in the Stockholm City Hall; 2014–2022	Succeeded by Nike Örbrink
Political offices
Preceded by Ida Karkiainen	Minister for Public Administration; 2022–present	Incumbent
