= Charlie Weimers =

Swedish politician (born 1982)

Charlie Weimers MEP
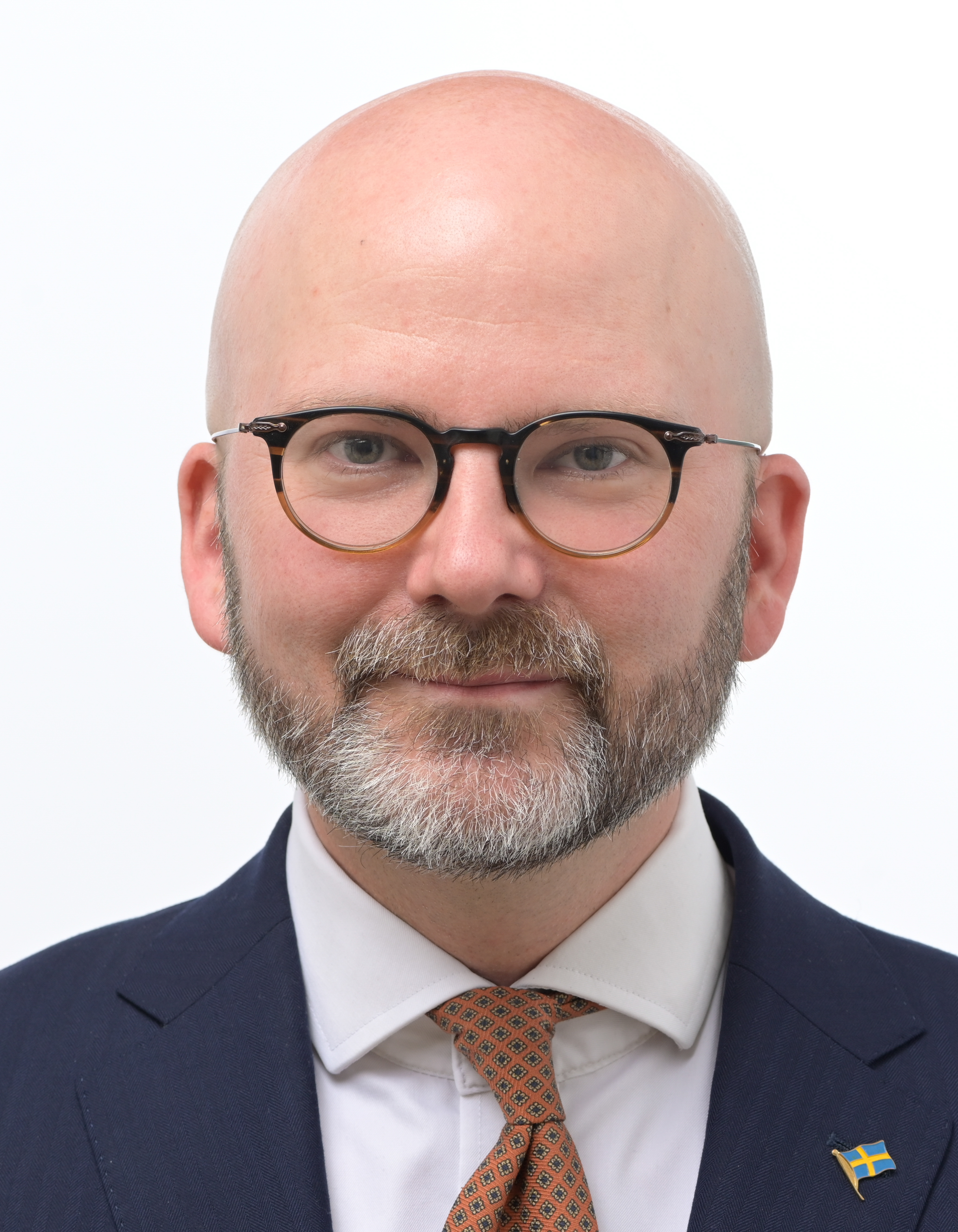

Member of the European Parliament
- Incumbent
- Assumed office 2 July 2019
- Constituency: Sweden

Personal details
- Born: Charlie Andreas Weimers; 12 November 1982 (age 43) Hammarö, Sweden
- Party: Sweden Democrats (since 2018)
- Other political affiliations: Moderate (1996–1998); Christian Democrats (1998–2018)
- Education: Karlstad University

Charlie Andreas Weimers (born 12 November 1982) is a Swedish politician and Member of the European Parliament (MEP) from Sweden since 2019. He was re-elected in the 2024 European Parliament election in Sweden. He is a member of the Sweden Democrats, part of the European Conservatives and Reformists.

== Biography ==
=== Life and career ===
Weimers was born in 1982 in Hammarö. After finishing high school, he completed conscripted service in the Swedish Army as a group commander in the A9 Artillery Regiment. After his military service, he studied at the American University in Washington DC and pursued graduate studies in Karlstad University's political science program, graduating in 2007. He subsequently worked as a public relations consultant for a marketing company and then as a political secretary to former Christian Democrats chairman Göran Hägglund and as a staffer for Lars Adaktusson.

== Politics ==
=== Early career ===
Weimers was a volunteer for the College Republicans during his studies in the United States. In Sweden, he was a member of the Moderate Party until 1998 after which he joined the Christian Democrats and the Young Christian Democrats. He served as the district chairman of KDU-Värmland from 2000 to 2001 and again from 2003 to 2004. He was chairman of the Swedish Young Christian Democrats (Kristdemokratiska Ungdomsförbundet, KDU) between 2008–2011. He was elected vice president of the Youth of the European People's Party at the 6th YEPP Congress in Stockholm in May 2007. He was elected to the KDU national board in 2003. He lost a close race for chairmanship of the KDU in 2005 to Ella Bohlin, a more centrist candidate. Weimers was later elected first vice chairman of KDU at the national convention in 2005.

Weimers was elected to the Hammarö Municipal Council in 2002. He was elected again in 2006, and served as party leader for the Christian Democrats in the council. He has also been a member of the Värmland Regional Council since 2006.

He was elected chairman of the KDU in 2008. During his time in the KDU, he was seen as part of a force along with future leader Ebba Busch Thor to shift the party to the right and in a more conservative direction by calling for stricter punishments for violent crime, preservation of Swedish culture and for Sweden to consider NATO membership.

After the 2010 general election, Hammarö switched majority from a socialist rule to blue-green one, consisting of five parties (Moderates, Liberal Peoples Party, Centre Party, Green Party and Christian Democrats), thus making Weimers Deputy Mayor of Hammarö. Because of this, Weimers declared in January 2011 that he would resign in June 2011, which he did.

In 2015, there was speculation that the Sweden Democrats wanted to recruit Weimers, although this news was disputed by Weimers at the time. This speculation increased in June 2018 when it was announced his wife had joined the Sweden Democrats. On 6 September 2018, Weimers announced he had joined the Sweden Democrats. His stated reason for leaving KD for SD was that: "Sweden needs a responsible migration policy and SD is the only party that stands up for this." At the same time, he was expelled from the Christian Democrats for stating his intention to vote for the Sweden Democrats in an upcoming election.

=== European Parliament ===
In the May 2019 Elections to the European Parliament Weimers was elected with c. 30,000 personal votes. During the campaign he highlighted the 40% proposed increase of the Swedish contribution to the EU budget and called on the Löfven II Cabinet to veto the proposed increase.

Weimers is a member of the European Parliament Committee on Foreign Affairs and of the Delegation to Iraq and a substitute member of the European Parliament Committee on Civil Liberties, Justice and Home Affairs and Delegation to the U.S.

In the European Parliament Weimers has supported motions calling on the EU to classify the Grey Wolves and ANTIFA as terrorist organisations and to improve information for citizens on Commission roadmaps.

Weimers has criticised decisions made by the Swedish government to give financial aid to Islamic Relief and the Swedish Muslim organisation Ibn Rushd who Weimers argues has "repeatedly invited undemocratic, misogynistic, anti-Semitic, homophobic and pro-violence speakers."

In March 2024, Weimers was one of twenty MEPs to be given a "Rising Star" award at The Parliament Magazine's annual MEP Awards

== Sanctions by Islamic Republic of Iran ==
On 26 October 2022 the Ministry of Foreign Affairs of the Islamic Republic of Iran announced that Weimers was one of six Members of the European Parliament personally sanctioned in retaliation for EU sanctions announced on 17 October. Weimers responded stating the announcement was "A badge of honor" asking "What took them so long?".

== Policy positions and initiatives ==
=== Migration ===
Weimers is co-chair of the European Conservatives and Reformists Migration Working Group. He has called on the EU to build a wall on its border with Turkey and adopt a migration policy based on the Australian model. Weimers has called for the EU-commission to change its position and support financing of physical border barriers. Following hybrid warfare operations by Belarus against Poland, Lithuania and Latvia during 2021 and 2022, similar proposals enjoy support by a dozen EU Member States. A survey of 10 EU Member States conducted in late 2021 showed broad public support for EU-financing of physical border barriers.

He was an early proponent of the Danish plan to move asylum processing from Denmark to non‑European countries, calling it a 'win-win' plan. Weimers argues that population growth in Africa will force a new asylum system in the EU and that it should build on the principles of the Danish asylum plan. In October 2021 Weimers and the Sweden Democrats migration spokesperson presented a call for Sweden to negotiate a Danish style opt-out from EU justice and home affairs cooperation (including migration) in order to reduce asylum reception to zero as envisioned by the Sweden Democrats.

In 2022, Weimers proposed that the EU urgently launch wide-reaching Australia-style communication campaigns targeting diaspora communities, transit countries and countries of origin to deter illegal migration and people smuggling

=== Opposition to joint EU-debts and EU-taxes ===
Weimers has questioned the legality of Next Generation EU including tabling an amendment in the European Parliament to add to the resolution on the conclusions of the European Council meeting of 17–21 July 2020:

Disputes the legality of Next Generation EU with regard to Article 311 TFEU; notes that the EU will take on a debt of EUR 750 billion to be distributed as grants, loans and to fund parts of the EU budget; notes that, as late as 15 June 2020, the Council website stated that the principle of budgetary balance ‘prevents the European Union from issuing debt to finance itself’; notes that, as late as 29 June 2020 the European Commission website stated ‘EU borrowing is only permitted to finance loans to countries. The EU cannot borrow to finance its budget’;

In September 2020 the European Parliament was consulted on the revised council decision on the system of Own Resources of the European Union, a key piece of legislation underpinning Next Generation EU. Weimers sought to delete the section empowering the European Commission to "borrow funds on the capital markets on behalf of the Union up to an amount of EUR 750 000 000 000" from the agreement underpinning Next Generation EU. His amendment also would have deleted the derogation allowing for EUR 390 000 000 000 to be spent without requirement of repayment.

=== A new Swedish EU strategy and 'referendum lock' on transfers of power to the EU ===
In order to prevent further transfers of power to the EU, maximize Swedish influence and achieve better negotiation results Weimers and Sweden Democrats party leader Jimmie Åkesson in 2023 called for a new EU strategy.

They propose the introduction of a referendum lock modeled on the UK European Union Act 2011 and call for Swedish EU-exit to be enabled by removing references to membership in the constitution in order to signal to Brussels that Sweden is willing to walk away from the table. They also call for a cadre of trade negotiators to be trained and for an examination of how Brexit could have been better implemented. The Sweden Democrats want the negative effects of EU membership to be limited by examining what directives previous governments have gold plated and changing legislation so it is closer to the minimum requirements under EU law.

In February 2021 Weimers published an essay arguing for a referendum lock that would limit transfers of power and urging other net-paying member states to do the same. In Fokus magazine he wrote:

A conservative government should declare there is a clear and measurable economic limit to what Sweden is willing to contribute to the EU. In order to increase credibility, it should also be publicly declared that a referendum will be required before the Riksdag ratifies an agreement in which this limit is exceeded or violated. The referendum instrument then becomes a strategic instrument that both strengthens our negotiating position and binds our negotiators to respect the will of the people. The strategy will be strengthened if other net-paying countries that are hesitant about further supranationalism issue similar promises.

In October 2021, Weimers called on a potential future conservative Swedish government to ensure the Swedish public will have a say on the issue of enlargement of the EU to include the Western Balkan countries Albania, Serbia, Montenegro and North Macedonia by activating a "referendum lock".

=== EU-Taiwan relations ===
Weimers was the rapporteur for the first ever European Parliament report on EU-Taiwan relations. Adopted in the Foreign Affairs Committee with 60 votes in favor, 4 against, the report calls for an enhanced partnership with Taiwan and for the intensification of bilateral investments, in particular in industries where Taiwan is a leader, such as semiconductors and reiterates calls for steps towards a bilateral investment agreement and meaningful participation for Taiwan in international organizations.

The first-ever report was adopted in plenary with 580 votes in favor, 26 against and 66 abstentions on 21 October 2021. The government of Taiwan praised the adoption of the report calling it a "history-making text, adroitly drafted by @weimers, charts a course for the development of bilateral relations. It also sends a strong message: Taiwan is not alone."

The Chinese government reacted by calling on Brussels to "correct its mistakes". Chinese Communist Party-owned tabloid Global Times, in an op-ed entitled 'Radical MEPs whip up anti-China agenda, serve US interests', called Weimers and other MEPs "radical troublemakers" claiming that Weimers has "long held a twisted attitude toward China" referencing Weimers calling for an investigation into China's handling of COVID-19 in early 2020.

=== Special Committee in the European Parliament to investigate the origins of COVID-19 ===
In October 2021, Weimers announced that his initiative to establish a Special Committee to examine the origins of COVID-19 and EU funding for the Wuhan Institute of Virology had received preliminary support from a majority of political groups in the European Parliament and that a formal decision to establish the committee is expected in the autumn of 2021. In February 2022 Weimers informed the public that leftist forces in the European Parliament most likely will succeed in watering down his original proposal for a Special Committee.

In February 2022 Weimers announced that the conservative group had managed secure agreement in the European Parliament to add the specific mention of the origins of COVID-19 "in Wuhan, China" to the Annual report 2021 on the implementation of the Common Security and Defence Policy.

=== Ukraine and Putin ===
On 19 April 2022, following the Russian invasion of Ukraine, when German Bundestag member Tino Chrupalla from right-wing populist party AfD praised Chancellor Olaf Scholz's decision not to send heavy weapons to Ukraine and demanded for sanctions against Russia to be ended and peace negotiations to start, Weimers responded by quoting Prussian General Carl von Clausewitz: "The Conqueror is always a lover of peace: he would prefer to take over our country unopposed" and commented that "patriots should stand with patriots, not with imperialists like Vladimir Putin."
