= Young Christian Democrats =

Young Christian Democrats may refer to:

== Youth organizations ==
- Young Christian Democrats (Sweden), the youth wing of the Christian Democrats
- Young Christian Democrats (Belarus), the youth wing of the Belarusian Christian Democracy
- Young Christian Democrats (Czech Republic), the youth wing of KDU-ČSL
- Young Christian Democrats (Lithuania)
- Young Christian Democrats (Norway), the youth wing of the Christian Democratic Party
