= Ulla-Britt Hagström =

Swedish politician

Ulla-Britt Hagström S

Member of the Swedish Parliament for Västra Götaland County East
- In office 1998–2002

Personal details
- Born: Gerd Ulla-Britt Johansson; 16 June 1945 (age 80) Jönköping County
- Party: Liberals (since 2006)
- Other political affiliations: Christian Democrats (until 2006)
- Profession: Politician

Gerd Ulla-Britt Hagström (née Johansson; born 16 June 1945) is a Swedish politician (until 2005 Christian Democrat, Liberals since 2006). Hagström was for six years chair of the Christian Democratic Women's League and also sat in the Riksdag for the Christian Democrats from 1998 to 2002.

== Biography ==
Ulla-Britt Hagström has a master's degree in education. She has worked as a teacher at primary schools in Landskrona, Bara and Skövde since 1969.

Ulla-Britt Hagström has been a member of the municipal council in Skövde since 1997. She has been chair of the Education Committee. Since 2010, Hagström has participated in the Liberal Party leadership in Skaraborg as vice chair. From 1997 to 2002, Hagström was a member of the government's Gender Equality Council. She has also been a member of parliamentary committees such as the Disability Inquiry, the Local Democracy Committee, the Labour Market Policy Committee, the Municipal Equalization Inquiry, the Allbo Committee and the Upper Secondary School Committee 2000. She also has experience as a member of the Swedish Association of Local Authorities' Education Committee from 1992 to 1995, as well as the role of municipalities in the healthcare sector from 1993 to 1994, and on the board of the Swedish National Land Survey from 2003 to 2008.

Ulla-Britt Hagström talks about everyday political life in the book The 30-year war for equality – the path from the Christian Democrats to the People's Party.

As a leisure activity, Hagström leads the Motormen's Local Club Skaraborg with a focus on infrastructure, environmental issues, traffic safety and traffic sobriety.
