= Christian Democratic Women's League =

Swedish political organization

The Christian Democratic Women's league (Swedish: Kristdemokratiska Kvinnoförbundet) is the women's wing of the Christian Democratic Party in Sweden. The organisation was founded in 1982 and is working to promote gender equality and promote the woman's position in society. The organisation, whose membership is open to both genders, is actively working to interest and support women in the political work. At the end of 2005, the organisation had 2270 members.

== Chairpersons ==
- 1982-1983 Laila Hultberg
- 1983-1996 Margareta Viklund
- 1996-2002 Ulla-Britt Hagström
- 2002-2009 Désirée Pethrus Engström
- 2009-2013 Maria Fälth
- 2009-2013 Marie-Louise Forslund Mustaniemi
