= Christian Social Responsibility =

Former Swedish lobby organization

Christian Social Responsibility (CSR, Kristet Samhällsansvar) was a lobby organization that was founded in the mid-1950s in Sweden. The goal of the organisation was to get Christian politicians placed high up on the voting papers of the Swedish political parties. CSR had a grassroots network of active members across the entire nation and produced their own material. CSR formed the origin of the current Swedish party, the Christian Democrats.

The chairman of the organisation was Centre Party voter and bishop Sven Danell. Lewi Pethrus, a pentecostal pastor and later one of the founders of the Christian Democratic Party was another founder and vice chairman. Birger Ekstedt, later to become the chairman of the Christian Democratic Party, was the secretary of the organisation.
