= Ida Karkiainen =

Swedish politician (born 1988)

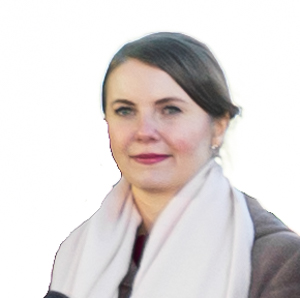

Minister for Public Administration
- In office 30 November 2021 – 17 October 2022
- Monarch: Carl XVI Gustaf
- Prime Minister: Magdalena Andersson
- Preceded by: Lena Micko
- Succeeded by: Erik Slottner

Personal details
- Born: Ida Victoria Karkiainen; 10 May 1988 (age 38) Haparanda, Sweden
- Party: Social Democrats
- Spouse: Mattias Lind

Ida Victoria Karkiainen (born 10 May 1988) is a Swedish politician for the Social Democratic party. She was the Minister for Public Administration in Magdalena Andersson's cabinet from 30 November 2021 to the government's dissolution on 17 October 2022.

Karkiainen is in a relationship with musician Mattias "Buffeln" Lind who is a member of the industrial metal band Raubtier. Her connection to the band and their violent and nationalistic lyrics and hard partying lifestyle has created some controversy in Swedish media.

After the 2022 election, Karkiainen was made chairman of the Riksdag's constitutional commission.

Political offices
Preceded by Lena Micko	Minister for Public Administration; 2021–2022	Succeeded by Erik Slottner
