= Martin Hallander =

Swedish politician (born 1993)

Member of the Riksdag
- Incumbent
- Assumed office 28 September 2026
- Constituency: Skåne County Northern and Eastern

Personal details
- Born: 2 July 1993 (age 33)
- Party: Christian Democrats

Martin Erik Hallander (born 2 July 1993) is a Swedish politician who was elected member of the Riksdag in 2026. From 2018 to 2020, he served as chairman of the Young Christian Democrats.
