= Magnus Berntsson =

Swedish politician (born 1973)

Member of the Riksdag
- Incumbent
- Assumed office 26 September 2022
- Constituency: Gothenburg Municipality

Personal details
- Born: 5 September 1973 (age 53)
- Party: Christian Democrats

Magnus Berntsson (born 5 September 1973) is a Swedish politician serving as a member of the Riksdag since 2022. From 1999 to 2001, he served as leader of the Young Christian Democrats.
