= Johan Danielsson =

Swedish politician (born 1982)

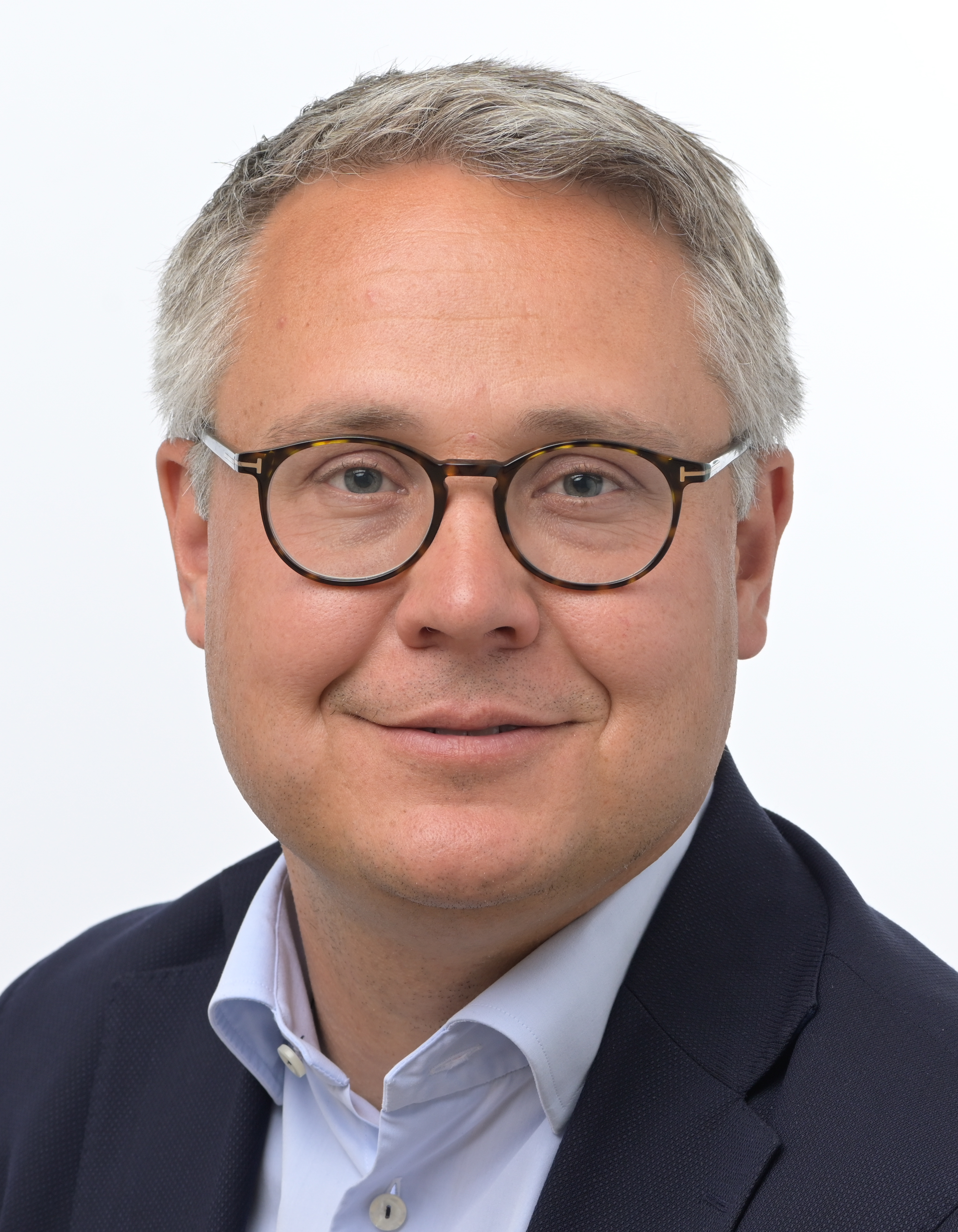

Member of the European Parliament
- Incumbent
- Assumed office 16 July 2024
- Constituency: Sweden
- In office 2 July 2019 – 30 November 2021
- Constituency: Sweden

Minister for Housing
- In office 30 November 2021 – 17 October 2022
- Prime Minister: Magdalena Andersson
- Preceded by: Märta Stenevi
- Succeeded by: Andreas Carlson

Vice-Chair of the European Parliament Committee on Transport and Tourism
- In office 10 July 2019 – 30 November 2021
- Chair: Karima Delli
- Serving alongside: Sven Schulze; István Ujhelyi; Jan-Christoph Oetjen

Personal details
- Born: 30 June 1982 (age 43) Borlänge, Sweden
- Party: Social Democrats
- Occupation: Trade unionist

Johan Danielsson (born 30 June 1982) is a Swedish trade unionist and politician of the Social Democratic Party who has served as Minister for Housing and Deputy Minister for Employment in cabinet of Prime Minister Magdalena Andersson until Magdalena Andersson did not get reelected.

== Political career ==
Danielsson was elected into the European Parliament in the 2019 elections. In parliament, he served on the Committee on Transport and Tourism. In addition to his committee assignments, he was part of the Parliament's delegation for Northern cooperation and for relations with Switzerland and Norway and to the EU-Iceland Joint Parliamentary Committee and the European Economic Area (EEA) Joint Parliamentary Committee. He was replaced in the European Parliament by Ilan de Basso.
