= Christian Democratic Senior League =

The Christian Democratic Senior League (Swedish: Kristdemokratiska Seniorförbundet) is a Swedish christian democratic organisation primarily for senior members of the Christian Democratic Party. The organisation was founded in 1993 and was the first ever organisation of its type in Sweden. The organisation's aim is to promote issues that concern the elderly and influence the public opinion in those questions. At the end of 2005, the party had 2340 members.

The organisation is a member of the European Senior Citizen's Union (ESCU).

== Chairman ==
- Jerzy Einhorn 1993–2000
- Stig Nyman 2000–2002
- Bror Stefenson 2002–2007
- Leif Hallberg 2007–2013
- Jan Erik Ågren 2013–2015
- Sture Eriksson 2015–2016
- Leif Hallberg 2016–2019
- Lars O. Molin 2019-
