= Jakob Forssmed =

Swedish politician (born 1974)

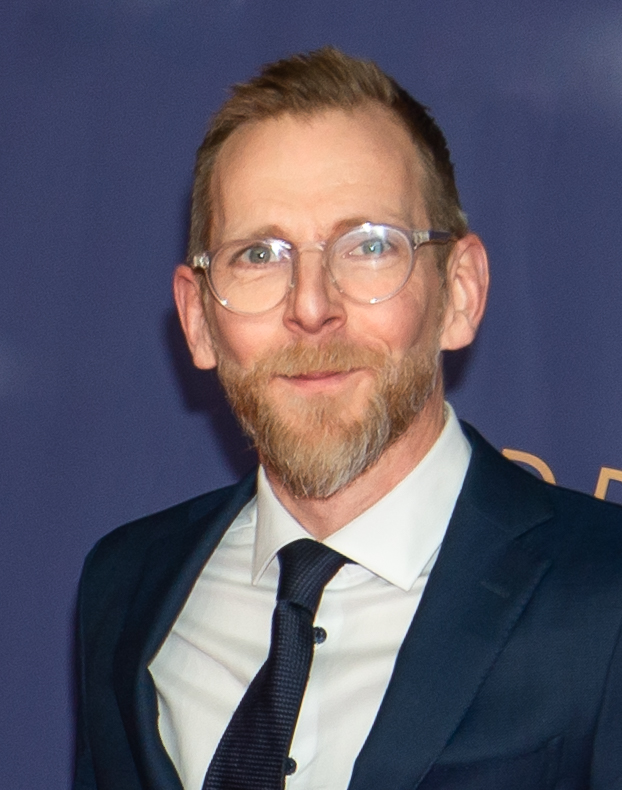
- Forssmed in 2023

Minister for Social Affairs and Public Health
- Incumbent
- Assumed office 18 October 2022
- Prime Minister: Ulf Kristersson
- Preceded by: Ardalan Shekarabi (as Minister for Health and Social Affairs)

Member of the Riksdag
- Incumbent
- Assumed office 29 September 2014
- Constituency: Stockholm County

Personal details
- Born: 28 December 1974 (age 51) Jönköping, Sweden
- Party: Christian Democrats
- Relatives: Ola Forssmed (second cousin)

Jakob Forssmed (born 28 December 1974) is a Swedish politician who has served as Minister for Social Affairs and Public Health in the cabinet of Prime Minister Ulf Kristersson since October 2022. A member of the Christian Democrats, he has been a member of the Riksdag since 2014 and first deputy leader under Ebba Busch since 2015.

Prior to entering the Riksdag, Forssmed was a state secretary in the coordination unit of the Prime Minister's Office during the cabinet of Prime Minister Fredrik Reinfeldt from 2006 to 2014. He also served as chairman of the Young Christian Democrats from 2001 to 2004.

Party political offices
Preceded by Magnus Berntsson	Chairman of the Young Christian Democrats; 2001–2004	Succeeded by Erik Slottner
Preceded by Maria Larsson	First Deputy Leader of the Christian Democrats; 2015–present	Incumbent
Political offices
Preceded by Ardalan Shekarabi	Minister for Social Affairs and Public Health; 2022–present	Incumbent
