= Désirée Pethrus Engström =

Swedish politician (born 1959)

Désirée Pethrus
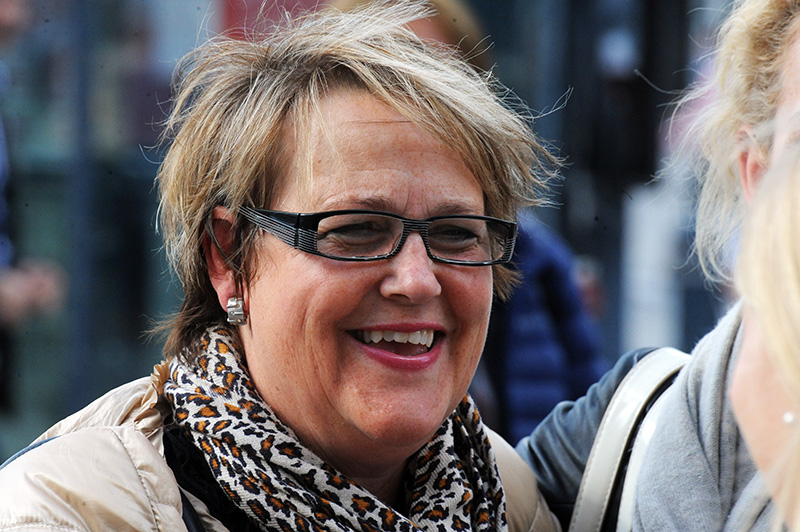

Member of the Swedish Riksdag for Stockholm County
- Incumbent
- Assumed office 6 October 2006

Personal details
- Born: 19 February 1959 (age 67) Stockholm, Sweden
- Party: Christian Democrats

Désirée Astrid Marianne Pethrus (born 19 February 1959) is a Swedish Christian Democratic politician. She was a substitute member of the Riksdag for Göran Hägglund from 2006 to 2010 and is now an ordinary member in her own right since 2010.

Her grandfather, Lewi Pethrus, was one of the founders of what is today the Christian Democrats.
