= Andreas Carlson =

Swedish politician (born 1987)

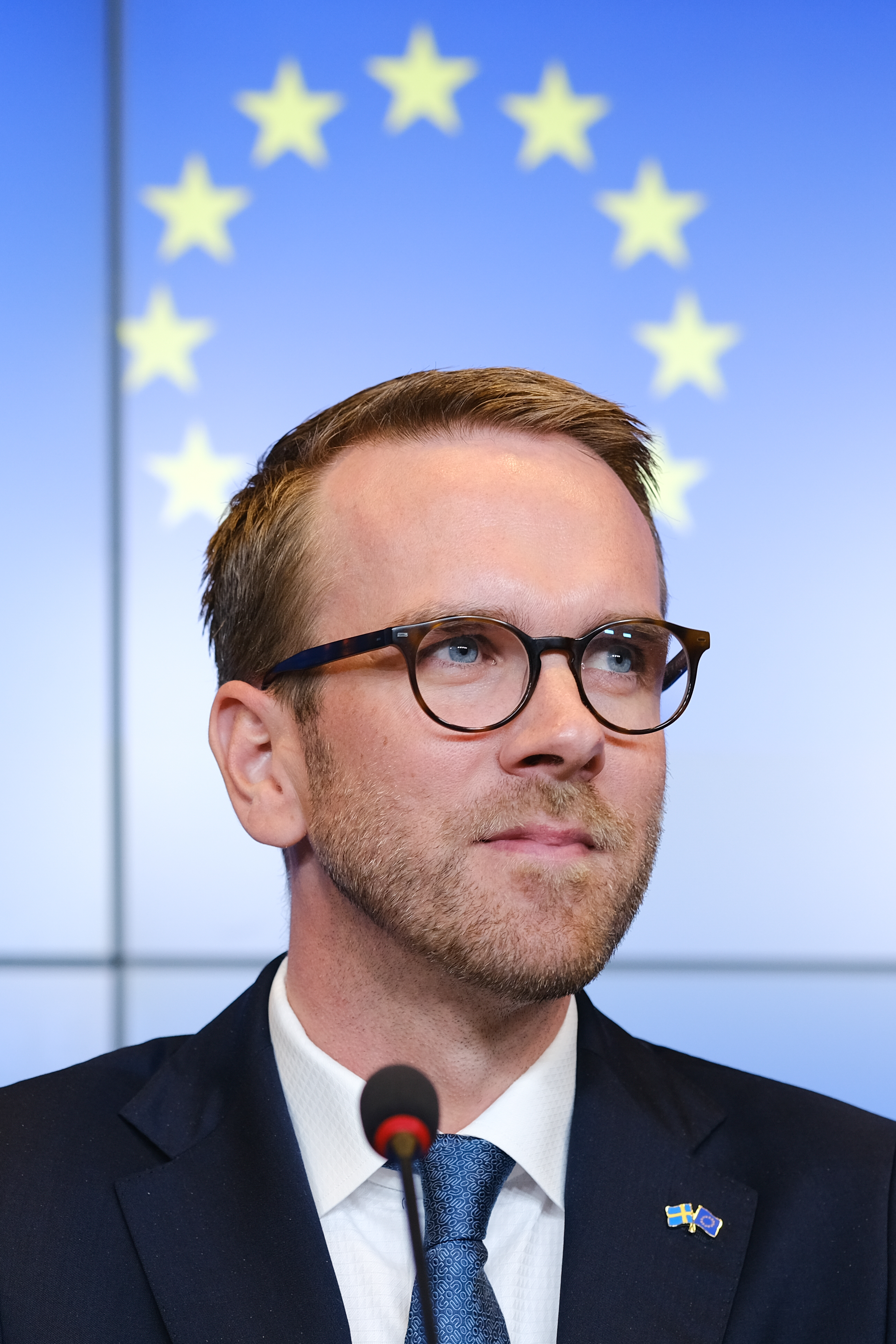
- Carlson in 2023.

Minister for Infrastructure and Housing
- Incumbent
- Assumed office 18 October 2022
- Prime Minister: Ulf Kristersson
- Preceded by: Tomas Eneroth (Infrastructure); Johan Danielsson (Housing)

Member of the Riksdag
- In office 6 October 2010 – 26 September 2022
- Constituency: Jönköping County

Personal details
- Born: 13 February 1987 (age 39) Mullsjö, Sweden
- Party: Christian Democrats

Andreas Thomas Carlson (born 13 February 1987) is a Swedish politician who has served as Minister for Infrastructure and Minister for Housing in the cabinet of Prime Minister Ulf Kristersson since October 2022. A member of the Christian Democrats, he was a member of the Riksdag from 2010 to 2022 and parliamentary group leader in the Riksdag from 2015 to 2022.

Party political offices
| Preceded by Emma Henriksson | Parliamentary group leader of the Christian; Democrats in the Riksdag; 2015–2022 | Succeeded by Camilla Brodin |
Political offices
| Preceded by Tomas Eneroth | Minister for Infrastructure; 2022–present | Incumbent |
| Preceded by Johan Danielsson | Minister for Housing; 2022–present | Incumbent |
