= Christian Democratic Student League =

Christian Democratic Student League Kristdemokratiska Studentförbundet
- Chairperson: Lucas Svärd
- Founded: 2000; 26 years ago
- Membership: 121 (2005)
- Ideology: Christian democratic; eliminating the obligatory study-group membership laws
- Mother party: Christian Democrats

The Christian Democratic Student League (Swedish: Kristdemokratiska Studentförbundet) is a Swedish Christian democratic organisation for university students. The organisation was founded in 2000, and they are active proponents for eliminating the obligatory study-group membership laws.

In 2003, the organisation joined with the right-wing party's student organisations to cooperate for a change in government. The organisation had at the end of 2005: 121 members and 7 regional organisations.

== Chairmen ==
- 2000–2001 Douglas Brommesson
- 2001–2003 Erik Augustin
- 2003–2006 Patrick E Vigren
- 2006–2008 Erik Bengtson
- 2008–2010 Aron Modig
- 2010–2011 Kalle Bäck
- 2011–2012 Erik Unogård
- 2012–2013 Jessica Presits
- 2013–2015 Andreas Brager
- 2015–2017 David Sikström
- 2017–2018 Louise Björnsson
- 2018–2019 Samuel Dalevi
- 2019–2020 David Rosemar
- 2020–2021 Alexander Mattebo
- 2021–2024 Lucas Svärd
- 2024-2025 William Persson
- 2025- Rakel Friberg
