= Emma Henriksson =

Swedish politician (born 1977)

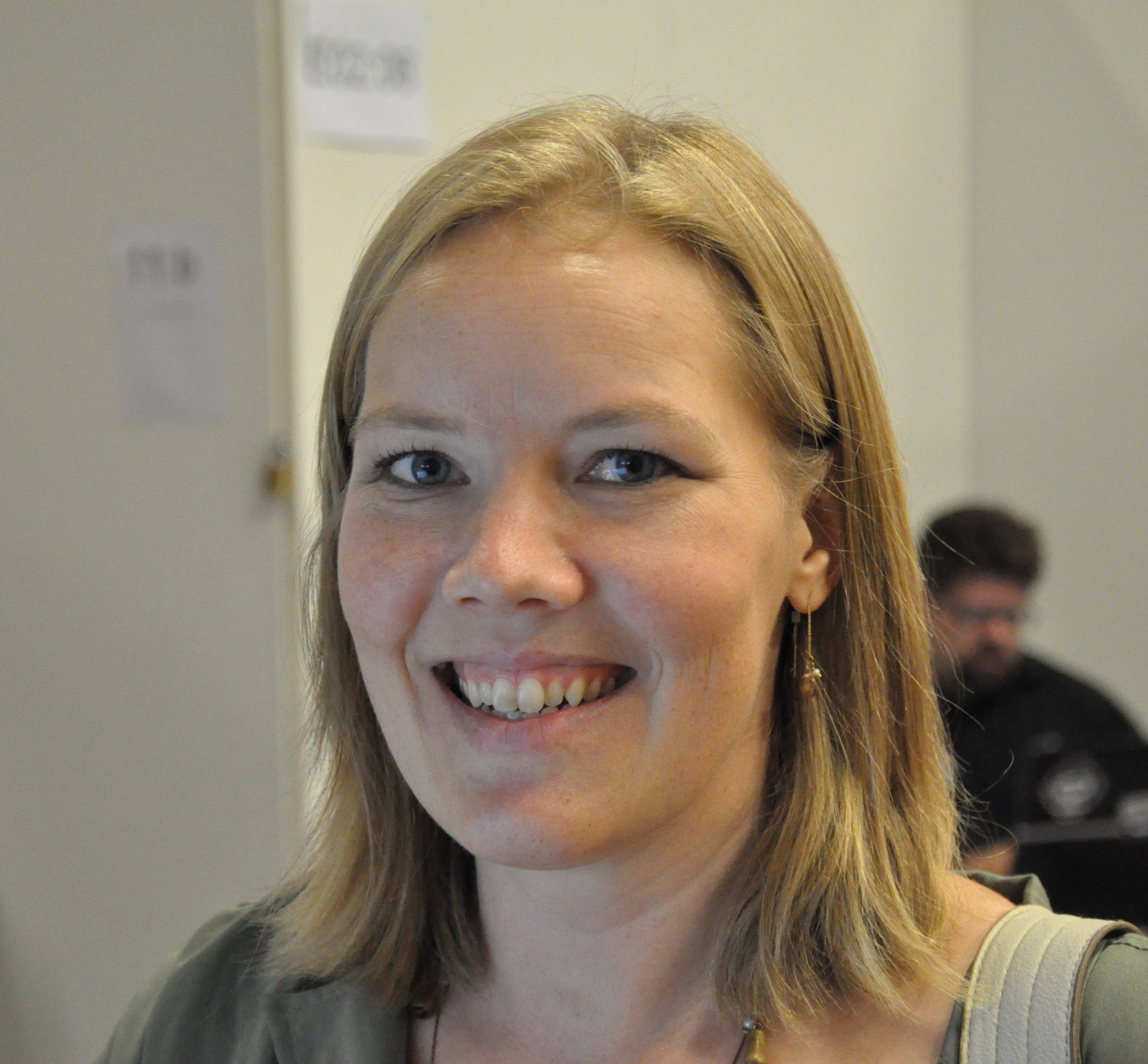

Leader of the Christian Democrats in the Swedish Riksdag
- In office 21 February 2012 – 16 June 2015
- Leader: Göran Hägglund; Ebba Busch Thor
- Preceded by: Mats Odell
- Succeeded by: Andreas Carlson

Member of the Swedish Riksdag for Stockholm County
- Incumbent
- Assumed office 6 October 2006

Personal details
- Born: 18 November 1977 (age 48)
- Party: Christian Democrats
- Occupation: Politician
- Website: Kristdemokraterna.se

Emma Henriksson (born 18 November 1977) is a Swedish politician. She was a member of the Christian Democrats and a substitute member of the Riksdag from 2006 to 2010, replacing Mats Odell when he served as Minister for Financial Markets. From 2010 to 2018, Henriksson was a member of the Riksdag by her own. She was chairwoman of the Riksdag's Committee on Social Affairs from 2014.

She was parliamentary group leader of her party from 2012 to 2015, replacing Mats Odell. She was the second deputy party leader from 2015 to 2017.
