= Birger Ekstedt =

Swedish politician and priest

Birger Ekstedt (1921–1972) was a Swedish politician (Christian democrat) and a priest.

Birger Ekstedt began his political career as a cultural-conservative member of the right-wing youth organisation, Högerns Ungdomsförbund and a frequent editorial in their newspaper.

After losing a battle over the party's manifesto in 1956 he moved on to the cultural assembly of the party and became its secretary. That is where he meet Lewi Pethrus, with whom he would later form the Christian Democratic party in Sweden. When Birger became a full-time priest in 1961 he left the world of politics and did not return until 1964 when he became one of the founding members and the chairman of the Christian Democratic Coalition of Sweden. He retained the post of chairman until his premature death in 1972.

He was succeeded by Alf Svensson.
