= Young Christian Democrats (Czech Republic) =

Young Christian Democrats Mladí křesťanští demokraté
- Abbreviation: MKD
- Founded: 1998
- Dissolved: 6 June 2021
- Merged into: Young Populars
- Headquarters: Prague
- Membership: 500
- Ideology: Christian democracyGreen conservatism
- Political position: Centre to centre-right
- National affiliation: Christian and Democratic Union – Czechoslovak People's Party
- European affiliation: Youth of the European People's Party
- Colours

Website
- www.mladikd.cz

The Young Christian Democrats of Czech Republic (Czech: Mladí křesťanští demokraté) was a political organization and one of the youth wings of Christian and Democratic Union – Czechoslovak People's Party. It was founded in 1998 a JuniorClub. It changed its name to the Young Christian Democrats of Czech Republic in 2004. Organization was dissolved on 6 June 2021 when it merged into another youth wing, the Young Populars.
