= Ella Bohlin =

Swedish politician

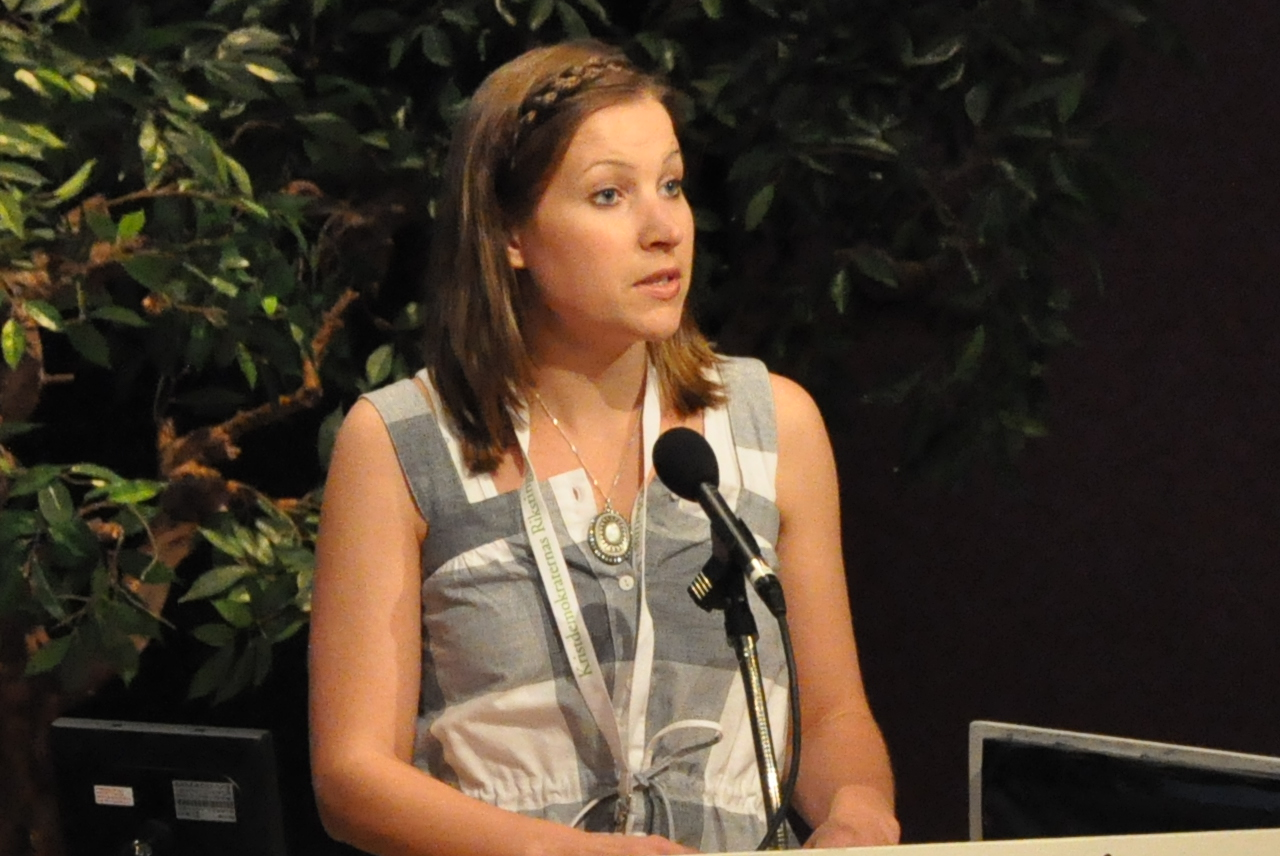
Ella Bohlin.

Ella Elin Nikolina Bohlin (born 1979) is a Christian Democratic politician in Sweden.

== Early life and education ==
Bohlin was born in Jönköping. She has a B.A. in political science and has worked as a spinning instructor.

== Political career ==
Bohlin was the leader of the Christian Democratic Youth League of Sweden between 2005 and 2008. She was her party's top candidate in the 2009 elections to the European Parliament, but was not elected because Alf Svensson, the former party leader, received more individual votes and took the party's single seat. In 2011 she became an advisor to the government on behalf of her party in environmental and agricultural matters. In 2014 she was elected to the Stockholm County Council, where she is minister for children and the aged.

== Personal life and views ==
She is married to Per Bohlin. She is an evangelical Christian and has been labeled a creationist, but says she does not care about the subject. She is a former member of Livets ord.
