= Alf Svensson (politician) =

Swedish politician (born 1938)

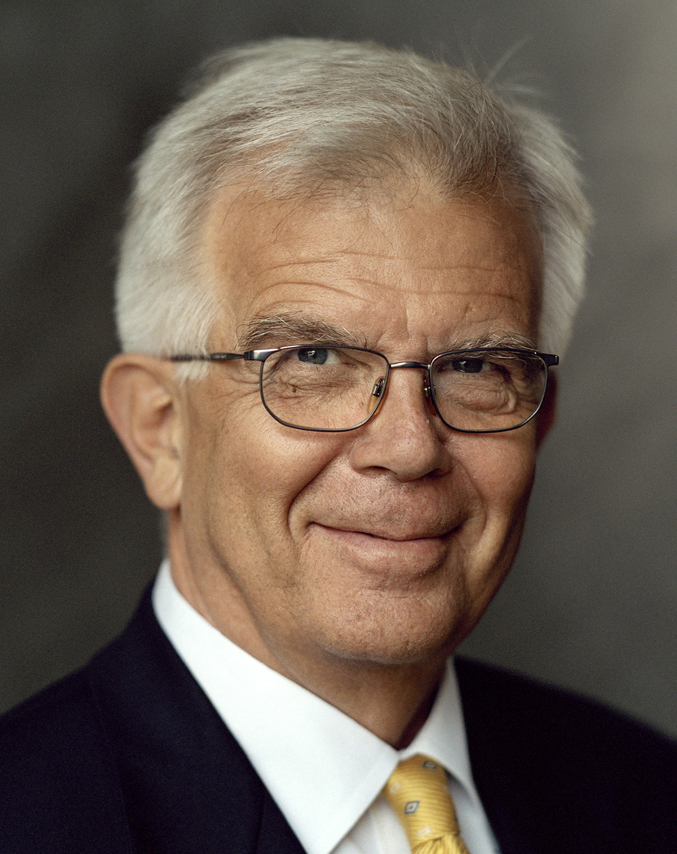
- Svensson in 2003

Member of European Parliament
- In office 14 July 2009 – 1 July 2014

Leader of the Christian Democrats
- In office 5 July 1973 – 3 April 2004
- Preceded by: Birger Ekstedt
- Succeeded by: Göran Hägglund

Minister for International Development Cooperation
- In office 4 October 1991 – 7 October 1994
- Prime Minister: Carl Bildt
- Preceded by: Lena Hjelm-Wallén
- Succeeded by: Pierre Schori

Personal details
- Born: Alf Robert Olof Svensson; 1 October 1938 (age 87) Skövde, Sweden
- Party: Christian Democrats
- Spouse: Sonja Svensson (m. 1977)
- Children: 3
- Occupation: Adjunkt

Alf Robert Olof Svensson (born 1 October 1938) is a Swedish politician and author. He was a Member of the European Parliament from 2009 to 2014. Svensson was the leader of the Christian Democrats in Sweden between 1973 and 3 April 2004. He was a Member of Parliament from 1985 to 1988, and again from 1991 until his election to the European Parliament in 2009. Between 1991 and 1994 he was Minister for Development Cooperation in the liberal-conservative Cabinet led by Prime Minister Carl Bildt.

== Biography ==
Svensson was trained as a teacher, and taught Swedish and history at a high school in Huskvarna from 1963 until 1973.

He was a member of the Christian Democrats from the party's foundation in 1964; he was also one of the founders of its youth wing, Young Christian Democrats, in 1966, and was its chairman from 1970 to 1973. In 1973 he became the leader of the party, after its first leader Birger Ekstedt had died in 1972. Svensson was elected to the council of Gränna, following which he was elected to Jönköping's municipal council and later to Jönköping's county council.

At the 1985 elections the Christian Democrats, which had so far not won any parliamentary representation, entered into an election alliance with the Centre Party. Owing to this Svensson won a seat in the Riksdag (parliament), making him the first Christian Democrat MP, but disappointingly for the party this was its only such success. At the 1988 elections the alliance had been dissolved, and the Christian Democrats failed to get enough votes to enter the parliament on its own. At the 1991 elections the party secured the election of 26 MPs, and Svensson received the cabinet post of Minister for Development Cooperation in a four-party coalition government under the leadership of Carl Bildt.

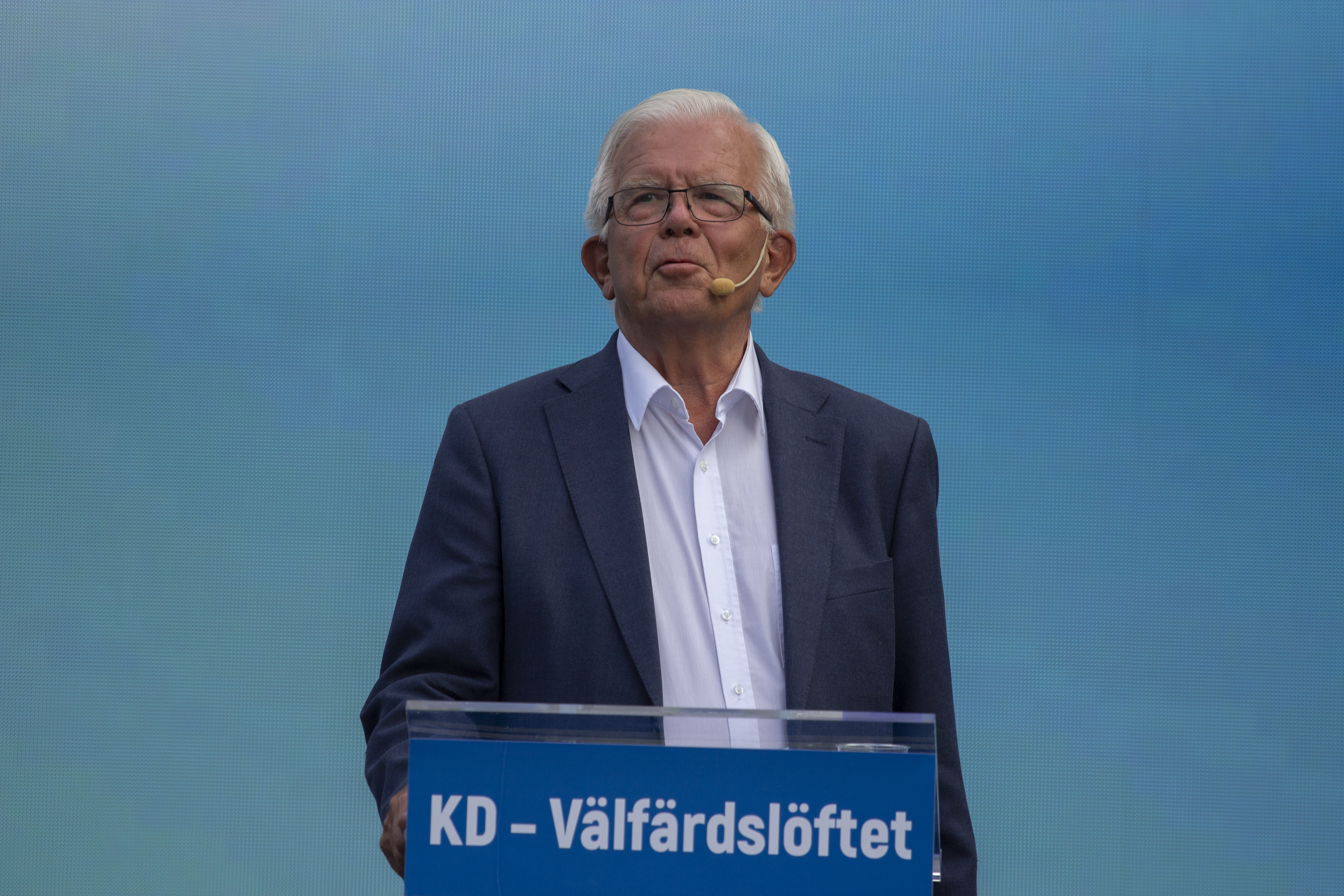
Alf Svensson 2018

Svensson resigned as party leader in 2004 and was succeeded by Göran Hägglund, but remained in parliament. Svensson has been party leader for 30 years, a record in Swedish politics. In the 2009 election to the European Parliament, he was elected an MEP and left the Riksdag. During his time as an MEP in European parliament, Svensson encouraged the EU to pay attention to poorer countries in the union as well called for improved coordination between member states.

Svensson, whose leadership of the Christian Democrats lasted over three decades (1973–2004), is a firm supporter of the European Union and its Economic and Monetary Union, unlike many of his voters who are in general more sceptical about the introduction of the euro.

=== Family ===
Svensson is married and has three children.

== Bibliography ==
- Time - From headwind to upwind (1984)
- Poletik (1990)
- I valet och talet : fem tal (1999)
- I valet och talet. Del 2, Sju tal (2000)
- Tal av Alf Svensson vid rikstinget i Piteå 2001 (2001)
- Här kommer Alf Svensson : minnen (2001)
