= Young Christian Democrats (Sweden) =

Young Christian Democrats Kristdemokratiska ungdomsförbundet
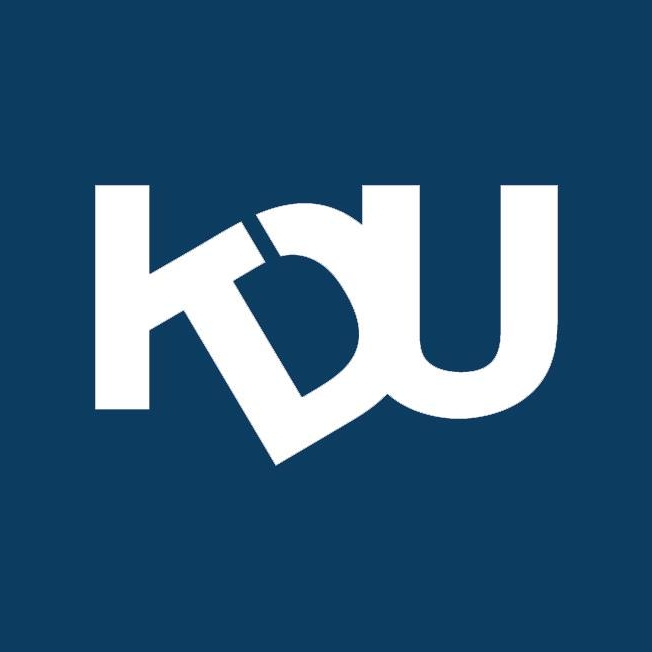
- Chairperson: Louise Hammargren
- Secretary General: Karolina Kässlin
- Founded: 1966
- Membership: 7 234 (2025)
- Ideology: Christian democracy Conservatism; Social conservatism National conservatism Economic liberalism
- Mother party: Christian Democrats
- International affiliation: International Young Democrat Union
- European affiliation: Youth of the European People's Party (YEPP)
- Nordic affiliation: Nordic Christian Democratic Youth (KDUN)
- Website: www.kdu.se

The Young Christian Democrats (Swedish: Kristdemokratiska ungdomsförbundet, KDU) is the youth organization of the Christian Democrats in Sweden.

KDU was founded at a conference in Sundsvall 1966. Initially the name of the organization was Christian Democratic Youth (Kristen Demokratisk Ungdom) but were later changed.

== List of chairmen ==
- Bernt Olsson 1966–1970
- Alf Svensson 1970–1973
- Mats Odell 1975–1981
- Anders Andersson 1981–1984
- Bert-Inge Karlsson 1984–1986
- Stefan Attefall 1986–1989
- Göran Holmström 1989–1992
- Hans Åström Eklind 1992–1996
- Amanda Agestav (Grönlund) 1996–1997
- Magnus Jacobsson 1997–1999
- Magnus Berntsson 1999–2001
- Jakob Forssmed 2001–2004
- Erik Slottner 2004–2005
- Ella Bohlin 2005–2008
- Charlie Weimers 2008–2011
- Aron Modig 2011–2013
- Sara Skyttedal 2013–2016
- Christian Carlsson 2016–2018
- Martin Hallander 2018–2020
- Nike Örbrink 2020–2023
- Stefan Sarmes 2023–2024
- Louise Hammargren 2024–present

=== Honorary chairman ===
- Alf Svensson 2021–

== Current national leadership: 2025-2026 ==
=== Presidency ===
- Chairman: Louise Hammargren
- 1st Vice Chairman: Max Pelin
- 2nd Vice Chairman: Juliette Walldov

=== Members of the Board ===
- Viktoria Lautmann
- Hugo Björken
- Matilda Anttonen
- Max Dahlgren
- Benjamin Jiang
- Myden Tanriver
- Gabriella Eckardt
