= Christian Democrats (Sweden) =

Political party in Sweden

Christian Democrats Kristdemokraterna
- Abbreviation: KD
- Chairperson: Ebba Busch
- Founder: Lewi Pethrus
- Founded: 20 March 1964; 62 years ago
- Headquarters: Munkbron 1, Stockholm
- Student wing: Christian Democratic Student League
- Youth wing: Young Christian Democrats
- Women's wing: Christian Democratic Women's League
- LGBTQ wing: Open Christian Democrats
- Membership (2023): ▼23,707
- Ideology: Christian democracy; Conservatism (Swedish); Social conservatism; Agrarianism (Nordic)
- Political position: Centre-right to right-wing
- European affiliation: European People's Party
- European Parliament group: European People's Party Group
- International affiliation: Centrist Democrat International; International Democracy Union
- Nordic affiliation: Centre Group
- Colours: Navy Blue (customary); Blue (official); White
- Riksdag: 22 / 349
- European Parliament: 1 / 21
- County councils: 119 / 1,696
- Municipal councils: 676 / 12,700

Website
- kristdemokraterna.se

The Christian Democrats (Swedish: Kristdemokraterna [ˈkrɪ̂sːtdɛmʊˌkrɑːtɛɳa], KD) is a Christian democratic political party in Sweden founded in March 1964. It first entered parliament in 1985, through electoral cooperation with the Centre Party; in 1991, the party won seats on its own. The party leader since 25 April 2015 has been Ebba Busch.

The party name was initially abbreviated to KDS (standing for Kristen demokratisk samling , Christian Democratic Unity), from its foundation in 1964 to 1996, when the party changed its name to the current Christian Democrats and its abbreviation to KD.

The party was a minor party in centre-right coalition governments led by Moderate Party Prime Ministers Carl Bildt from 1991 to 1994 and Fredrik Reinfeldt from 2006 to 2014, with the latter under a formalised cooperation within the Alliance for Sweden. The party has been a minor party in the coalition government led by Moderate Party Prime Minister Ulf Kristersson since 2022, this time with Moderate Party and the Liberals with support from the Sweden Democrats.

The KD sits with the European People's Party in the European Parliament, and is a member of Centrist Democrat International and International Democracy Union in which both contain other Christian democratic parties.

== History ==
=== Background ===
The party had its roots in a movement against the Swedish government's decision in 1963 to remove religious education from the elementary school syllabus. An organisation called "Christian Social Responsibility", which would later become the Christian Democratic Unity, organised several marches against the decision, one of which became one of the largest in Swedish modern history. Despite the public outcry and over 2.1 million protest signatures, the decision went through. The group that had worked in the campaign felt it was a sign that Swedish politics needed a Christian Democratic Party.

The political and social origins of the Swedish Christian Democrats clearly differ from those of the European continental Christian Democratic parties (as in Italy or Germany). In those countries, Christian Democracy represented the mainstream of the social-conservative political forces and was closely tied to majoritarian religious practice. In Sweden, however, Christian Democracy emerged as a minority grouping amongst the centre-right forces and was tied to minority-religious tendencies in society (particularly among voters associated with the free churches and likeminded Lutherans).

=== Founding ===
In the beginning of 1964, Lewi Pethrus, founder of the Swedish Pentecostal movement and chief editor of the Swedish newspaper Dagen, discussed the idea of a Swedish Christian democratic party on the editorial pages of Dagen. He stated that many people had contacted him about the idea and that the current Swedish political climate was dominated by atheist economic materialism.

Principal Algot Tergel hosted a conference on 7 February of the same year. The topic of the conference was "Christianity and Politics", and during the conference the idea of starting a Christian Democratic Party was discussed. A committee consisting of Pethrus and eight other Free Church leaders was formed.

A large and widespread debate followed the decision to create the committee. Dagen published an interview with Kjell Bondevik, the leader of the Norwegian Christian Democratic Party, and there were talks about creating a Christian Democratic Party in Finland as well.

On 20 March 1964, the party was founded as Christian Democratic Unity (Kristen demokratisk samling). At first, it was only an organisation, but at a board meeting later that year it was decided that the organisation would be revamped into a party and that it would compete in the national elections in Sweden. The first roughly 100 members elected Birger Ekstedt to the post of party chair and Lewi Pethrus to the post of vice chair.

The party grew rapidly; by the end of the year, it had 14,500 members.

=== Early years ===
During its early years, the KDS was sometimes called the "Air and Water" party because of its strong emphasis on environmental politics. At that time the Green Party of Sweden did not exist, and thus the Christian Democratic Unity had a unique appeal with its environmentally friendly policies. In the Swedish national elections of 1964 the party gained 1.8% of the vote, not enough to get any seats in the Riksdag, but the party already had influence at the municipal level. In the municipal elections of 1966 the party gained 354 seats.

At this time, the established major parties of Sweden began discussing new ways of making it more difficult for minor parties to enter the Riksdag. The Riksdag was reformed in 1971; with this came the D'Hondt method of allocating seats. The electoral threshold was set at 4%, which meant that the wanted political breakthrough was far away now.

Birger Ekstedt died in 1972, aged 51, only a few days after having been reelected as the party chair. An emergency congress was called; there Alf Svensson, the relatively unknown chair of the youth wing of the party, was elected chair. Svensson was to become one of the most important figures in modern Swedish politics. In the national elections of 1973 the party gained 1.8% of the vote, the same result as in the two preceding elections.

Before the national elections of 1976, there was a strong call for a change to a right-wing government in Sweden. The organisation "Vote right-wing" was formed to promote the change to a right-wing government. The KDS, however, announced a desire not to be placed on the traditional right-wing/left-wing scale, a measurement system it felt was outdated. Therefore, the "Vote right-wing" organisation started a campaign of negative campaigning against the KDS with the slogan "Don't vote for KDS, don't throw away your vote" as the KDS had not reached the 4% threshold at the last elections. The effect of this large campaign on a small and relatively new party like the KDS was disastrous, and it gained only 1.4% of the vote in the 1976 election.

At the start of the 1980s, the party revamped its entire political manifesto. The party abandoned its conservative stance on abortion and instead assumed a moderate pro-choice stance and adopted a plank to work to lower the total number of abortions in Sweden through encouragement of individual voluntary measures instead. In the 1980 nuclear power referendums the party supported the "no" campaign, which meant opposing any further construction of new nuclear power-plants in Sweden and advocating the phasing-out of all nuclear power plants in Sweden within 10 years, together with increased investments in renewable energy.

In 1982, the Christian Democratic Women's League was founded, and the party gained 1.9% of the votes, for the first time getting more than 100,000 votes.

=== Way into the Riksdag ===
As early as 1978, the KDS discussed the idea of electoral cooperation with the Centre Party. Similar ideas were discussed before the 1982 elections but were never put into action. One of the proponents of such a collaboration was the then secretary of information Mats Odell. The party officially took a stance against a socialist government, which effectively put them together with the right-wing block.

The negotiations were difficult, but in 1984 the Centre Party and KDS agreed to run under a joint banner in the next year's elections under the name Swedish: Centern ("The Centre").

The deal, which was heavily criticised by the Swedish Social Democratic Party, meant that each party had its own voting ticket but that the Centre Party should nominate a Christian Democratic candidate on at least five of the regional candidacy lists. The Centre Party ticket would win over the KDS ticket almost everywhere, but this way there would be at least five Christian Democrats in the Riksdag. The Centre Party did not fulfil its promise, however, and put a Christian Democrat on the list only in the municipality of Kalmar. This resulted in great tensions within the Christian Democrats; one of the party icons, the environmental activist Björn Gillberg, left the party. However, Alf Svensson managed to get into the Riksdag through the KDS party ticket in Jönköping.

=== Real breakthrough ===
In 1987, the party manifesto was revamped once again (although not so heavily as the last time), and the party changed its name to Christian Democratic Social Party (Swedish: Kristdemokratiska Samhällspartiet), while adjusting the abbreviation to KdS . In the 1988 national elections the party grew significantly and gained 2.8% of the votes. But the Centre Party did not wish any further electoral cooperation, and Alf Svensson had to leave the Riksdag. Something had happened, however. The party was now recognised as one of the major parties in Sweden, and Svensson had become famous. According to many opinion polls, he was the most popular politician in the entire nation.

Several famous people joined the party, and in the right-wing breakthrough national elections of 1991 the party grew explosively yet again and gained over 7% of the votes. The right-wing bloc gained a majority, and KdS formed a government with the right-wing bloc. Several Christian Democrats got positions within the new government: Alf Svensson as the minister of foreign aid (and vice foreign minister), Inger Davidson as minister of civilian infrastructure, and Mats Odell as minister of communications.

After the right-wing bloc lost the 1994 general election, the KdS managed to stay in the Riksdag and had assumed a steady position within Swedish national politics. In 1996, it changed its name to the current form, Christian Democrats (Kristdemokraterna), switching the abbreviation form to KD, in a gesture perceived by elements both inside and outside the party as helping deflect the belief that it was a strictly religious party. In 1998 the party had its best elections ever, gaining over 11% of the votes; it established itself as the fourth-largest party in the Riksdag, becoming larger than its former electoral partner the Centre Party. In the 2002 national elections, the party got fewer votes but still held on to its position as the fourth-largest party.

In 2004, Svensson stepped down in favor of his long-designated successor Göran Hägglund.

At the end of 2005, the party had 24,202 confirmed members, making it the fourth-largest party in size as well. Its membership is far more stable than most parties in Sweden. The Christian Democrats are represented in almost every municipality and region in Sweden.

=== Platform changes ===
The KD has previously held socially conservative views surrounding same-sex marriage. In 2007, the KD mostly voted against the introduction of same-sex marriage in parliament, with party leader Göran Hägglund stating "my position is that I have been tasked by the party to argue that marriage is for men and women. When we discuss it between parties we are naturally open and sensitive to each other's arguments and we'll see if we can find a line that allows us to come together." However, the party has since moderated its stance and now supports keeping same-sex marriage legal, albeit saying that churches should make the final decision on whether to perform wedding ceremonies and not the state, and in 2015 voted to change its platform in order to support same-sex adoption.

=== Alliance cabinet ===
As a member of the Alliance for Sweden, the winning side in the 2006 general election, the Christian Democrats got three minister posts in the Reinfeldt cabinet. The minister posts were held by Göran Hägglund, Mats Odell and Maria Larsson. Unlike the Moderate Party and the Liberal People's Party, the Christian Democrats and the Centre Party avoided scandals for personal conduct and accusations for espionage against the competing Social Democratic Party.

Hägglund, however, received criticism internally for defending the party's pro-choice stance on abortion, which some older members believed had contributed to the decline of the party in recent years. The Alliance cabinet's stance against unemployment and sick-listed benefits have been criticised by former party leader Alf Svensson, while the Sven Otto Littorin of the Moderate Party went into aggressive counterattack, but the Christian Democratic ministers were silent.

=== Decline and internal strife ===
Support of the Christian Democrats significantly declined in the European elections of 2009, where the former party leader Alf Svensson got the party's sole seat in the European Parliament at the expense of the party's top candidate Ella Bohlin. Though Bohlin had run her campaign with a focus on limiting alcohol and outlawing traditional Swedish snuff, Göran Hägglund stated in a speech two weeks after the elections that he wanted to "prohibit the prohibitions" and spoke about the difference between the values of the "people of reality" and the left-wing cultural elite. Some claim that this was not followed up by any political suggestions in the 2010 general election, where the party declined once again. Hägglund was criticized for not being controversial enough by MP Ebba Busch, and it was suggested that around a quarter of the party's representatives would like him to resign. Other commentators have suggested that the party's decrease in support has coincided with the rise of the Sweden Democrats, who gained the support of socially and culturally conservative Swedish voters.

The politics of the Young Christian Democrats have shifted to the right in the past few years, a change that has been attributed to many conservative ex-members of the Moderate Party joining the organization. Swedish political news magazine Fokus has stated that the conflict on traditional Christian moral questions (abortion, gay rights, stem cell research) is secondary to the conflict between those who want a Christian democratic and centrist party focused on social responsibility in addition to environmental questions, and those who want a traditional right-wing party focusing on populism and economic liberalism. The latter group has founded a network called FFFF (Freedom, family, diligence and enterprise), a group that has clear influences coming from Thatcherism. Christian Democratic youth leader Aron Modig has stated that he wants the Christian Democrats to become the "Tea Party" of Sweden, and push the government when it fails to present a likeminded vision of society.

=== Election of Ebba Busch ===
In 2015, the young deputy Mayor of Uppsala Ebba Busch was elected as new party leader. She moved the party towards a new more right-wing and secular position. In the 2018 election she showed herself to be a fierce debater lifting her party from what had been predicted as a sure defeat to the best election result in nearly 20 years.

In 2019, after the new government was announced the KD harshly criticized the incoming government and the liberal parties supporting it. To create an alternative to the center-left government the KD opened up to cooperation with the Sweden Democrats This move was popular with the voters and during this period the party saw continually increased support in the opinion polls.

Ahead of the European election the party had reached 13% in the opinion polls, which if it would have been the election result would be the best result for the Christian Democrats ever. This passed after the election when the Swedish newspaper Dagens Nyheter posted an article showing the KD's MEP Lars Adaktusson voting no to the expansion of abortion access 22 times while he sat in the European Parliament between 2014 and 2019. The situation for the party worsened during the COVID-19 pandemic where, as in most other countries, smaller opposition parties saw a decrease whilst the governments strengthened their support.

==== 2022 election ====
Ahead of the 2022 election, the Christian Democrats continued the party's turn to the right in a number of issues. In migration the party advocates a reduction in the number of refugees let into Sweden by 70%. The party's youth wing, KDU, went out and caused a stir after they proposed repatriation of migrants that have come, and that are coming, to Sweden. Ahead of the Folk och Försvar conference in 2020 the party proposed a doubling of the Swedish Defence budget so that it would meet the 2% of GDP spending each year.

During the 2022 election campaign, the party tried to grow by attracting Sweden's rural voters introducing new policies within the area as well as criticizing both the historically agrarian Centre Party and the Social Democrats, accusing them of having abandoned rural Sweden. The party also recruited former parliamentarian for the Centre Party, Staffan Danielsson and made him head of a party-associated organisation for farmers. Their opponents answered these attacks by calling the KD populist - criticising the use of anti-elitist rhetoric and for unhistorical references to a "made up" Swedish heartland.

The election was not a success for the Christian Democrats losing three MP:s. But as a part of the overall center-right coalition that Ebba Busch had been instrumental in creating the party joined the new Kristersson cabinet. The party received six ministerial portfolios and Ebba Busch was appointed as Deputy Prime Minister.

== Ideology ==
Ideologically, the KD is a Christian democratic party that since the 2010s has shifted to the right and adopted more conservative policies.

According to the party, their five most important policy issues include:

- Healthcare: reform the healthcare system and nationalise Swedish healthcare. Improve care guarantee. Reform the queue billion. Save supported living.
- Elderly care: retirement home guarantee as well as an abolished pensions tax. The KD also supports housing supplements for the elderly. The Christian Democrats especially emphasize the elderly's right to a dignified life and want to introduce a higher standard for nursing homes.
- Safety: more police officers and more resources to the police. The party also supports law and order policies, such as increasing resources for the police and stricter laws against sexual crimes and honor killings.
- Family: enable more time for the children, facilitate family formation, increase families' room for maneuver, upgrade parenthood, enable different forms of childcare and strengthen the finances of families with children. The party supports freedom of choice of parents for education and increased resources for schools in vulnerable areas.
- Integration: according to the party, jobs are one of the keys to good integration and that a society is built on a common set of values, where certain values are immutable.

KD's platform and policies have been shaped by the tenets of Christian democracy, stewardship, and the shared responsibility between the church and political institutions, the responsibility of solidarity towards fellow human beings and the safeguarding of civil society, permeated with socially and culturally conservative values.

The KD supports reducing petrol prices and abolishing the property tax. The KD also supports the monarchy.

The Christian Democrats want a flexible immigration policy, but one that is regulated and controlled. The party names a Nordic level when it comes to immigration, meaning the amount of refugees that enter Sweden should be at the same level as in the other Nordic countries. The KD also calls for a socially just but efficient asylum policy in which resources can be allocated to those in need in tandem with faster screening and quicker deportation of those who fail or abuse the asylum claiming processes, as well as increased spending on border patrol police. It also wants to introduce a special integration committee in the Riksdag and compulsory measures for refugees to learn Swedish and adopt Swedish customs and social norms. Since 2018, the party has pledged a tougher line against immigration and multiculturalism, including opposing the Islamic call to prayer in public spaces.

On foreign policy, the KD is largely supportive of Sweden's membership of the European Union. They were in favour of entering the eurozone during the 2003 Swedish euro referendum, but after the “No” side won the referendum in a landslide victory the party changed its stance and are now against joining the eurozone. They are calling for "a narrower and sharper EU" and that "on a number of issues, the EU need to take a step back and give more power back to the nation states”.

== Voter base ==
Historically, a large part of its voter base lays among those who belong to evangelical fellowships known in Sweden as free churches (Pentecostals, Methodists, Baptists, etc.) together with likeminded Lutherans (such as Göran Hägglund and Mats Odell). These churches have many followers in Småland and along the Swedish west coast, the regions in which the party is politically strongest. Important voter groups are senior citizens, families, voters in rural areas, members of free churches and citizens that belong to the upper middle class.

== Election results ==
=== Riksdag ===
Election	Leader	Votes	%	Seats	+/–	Status
1964	Birger Ekstedt	75,389	1.8 (#6)	0 / 233	New	No seats
1968	Birger Ekstedt	72,377	1.5 (#7)	0 / 233	Steady	No seats
1970	Birger Ekstedt	88,770	1.8 (#6)	0 / 350	Steady	No seats
1973	Alf Svensson	90,388	1.8 (#6)	0 / 350	Steady	No seats
1976	Alf Svensson	73,844	1.4 (#6)	0 / 349	Steady	No seats
1979	Alf Svensson	75,993	1.4 (#6)	0 / 349	Steady	No seats
1982	Alf Svensson	103,820	1.9 (#6)	0 / 349	Steady	No seats
1985 (Note: Alf Svensson elected on a joint list known as Centern together with the Center Party)	Alf Svensson	131,548	2.4 (#6)	1 / 349	▲1	Opposition
1988	Alf Svensson	158,182	2.9 (#7)	0 / 349	▼1	No seats
1991	Alf Svensson	390,351	7.1 (#5)	26 / 349	▲26	Coalition
1994	Alf Svensson	225,974	4.1 (#7)	15 / 349	▼11	Opposition
1998	Alf Svensson	618,033	11.7 (#4)	42 / 349	▲27	Opposition
2002	Alf Svensson	485,235	9.2 (#4)	33 / 349	▼9	Opposition
2006	Göran Hägglund	365,998	6.6 (#5)	24 / 349	▼9	Coalition
2010	Göran Hägglund	333,696	5.6 (#8)	19 / 349	▼5	Coalition
2014	Göran Hägglund	284,806	4.6 (#8)	16 / 349	▼3	Opposition
2018	Ebba Busch	409,478	6.3 (#6)	22 / 349	▲6	Opposition
2022	Ebba Busch	345,712	5.3 (#6)	19 / 349	▼3	Coalition
2026	Ebba Busch	417,490	6.17 (#6)	22 / 349	▲3	TBD

=== Regional councils ===
Election	Votes	%	Seats	+/–
1966	68,890	1.9	1 / 1,513	▲1
1970	86,513	1.9	2 / 1,524	▲1
1973	96,42	2.1	8 / 1,519	▲6
1976	97,62	1.9	8 / 1,683	Steady
1979	102,801	2.0	12 / 1,705	▲4
1982	123,588	2.4	21 / 1,717	▲9
1985	102,661	2.0	18 / 1,733	▼3
1988	151,323	3.1	40 / 1,743	▲22
1991	348,763	7.0	132 / 1,763	▲92
1994	191,004	3.7	58 / 1,777	▼74
1998	516,813	10.0	168 / 1,646	▲110
2002	428,804	8.2	141 / 1,656	▼27
2006	360,183	6.6	116 / 1,656	▼25
2010	268,126	5.0	82 / 1,662	▼34
2014	317,270	5.2	85 / 1,678	▲3
2018	457,679	7.1	119 / 1,696	▲34
2022	469,033	7.3	133 / 1,720	▲15

=== Municipal councils ===
Election	Votes	%	Seats	+/–
1966	66,551	1.5	353 / 29,546	▲353
1970	91,201	1.8	286 / 18,327	▼67
1973	106,355	2.1	250 / 13,236	▼36
1976	108,557	2.0	237 / 13,247	▼13
1979	115,478	2.1	276 / 13,369	▲39
1982	136,494	2.4	326 / 13,500	▲50
1985	113,292	2.0	278 / 13,520	▼48
1988	152,427	2.8	360 / 13,564	▲82
1991	318,762	5.8	815 / 13,526	▲455
1994	180,264	3.2	425 / 13,550	▼390
1998	421,783	8.0	1,069 / 13,388	▲644
2002	376,657	7.0	1,013 / 13,274	▼56
2006	320,027	5.8	813 / 13,092	▼200
2010	257,919	4.3	591 / 12,978	▼222
2014	248,070	4.0	515 / 12,780	▼76
2018	339,375	5.2	676 / 12,700	▲161
2022	348,420	5.4	755 / 12,614	▲79

=== European Parliament ===
Election	List leader	Votes	%	Seats	+/−	EP Group
1995	Unclear	105,173	3.92 (#7)	0 / 22	New	−
1999	Anders Wijkman	193,354	7.64 (#6)	2 / 22	▲2	EPP-ED
2004	Anders Wijkman	142,704	5.68 (#8)	1 / 19	▼1	EPP-ED
2009 2011	Ella Bohlin	148,141	4.68 (#8)	1 / 18 1 / 20	Steady	EPP
2014	Lars Adaktusson	220,574	5.93 (#8)	1 / 20	Steady	EPP
2019 2020	Sara Skyttedal	357,856	8.62 (#6)	2 / 20 2 / 21	▲1	EPP
2024	Alice Teodorescu Måwe	239,530	5.71 (#7)	1 / 21	▼1	EPP

== Organization ==
=== Leadership ===
Party chairperson
Year	Name
1964–1972	Birger Ekstedt
1973–2004	Alf Svensson
2004–2015	Göran Hägglund
2015–present	Ebba Busch

Vice chair
Year	Name
1964-1968	Lewi Pethrus
1968–1979	Åke Gafvelin
1979–1982	Ernst Johansson
1982–1985	Maj-Lis Palo
1985–1993	Jan Erik Ågren
1993–2003	Inger Davidson
2003–2015	Maria Larsson
2015–present	Jakob Forssmed

Second vice chair
Year	Name	Note
1965–1976	Sven Enlund	
1976–1979	Jona Eriksson	
1979–1982	Maj-Lis Palo	
1982–1987	Stig Nyman	
1987–1989	Rose-Marie Frebran	
1989–1990	Britt-Marie Laurell	
1990–1993	Ingrid Näslund	
1993–2003	Anders Andersson	
2003–2004	Göran Hägglund	
2004–2012	Mats Odell	Minister of Communications; 1991–1994
2012–2015	David Lega	MEP 2019–
2015–2017	Emma Henriksson	
2017–2019	Lars Adaktusson	
2019–	Bengt Germundsson	

Party secretary
Year	Name	Note
1964–1972	Bertil Carlsson	
1972–1978	Stig Nyman	
1978–1985	Per Egon Johansson	
1985–1989	Dan Ericsson	
1989–1991	Inger Davidson	Minister for Civil Service Affairs; 1991–1994
1991–1993	Lars Lindén	MP 2002–2008
1994–2002	Sven Gunnar Persson	MP 2002–2008
2002–2006	Urban Svensson	
2006–2010	Lennart Sjögren	
2010–2018	Acko Ankarberg Johansson	
2018–2022	Peter Kullgren	
2022–2023	Johan Ingerö	
2023–present	Liza-Maria Norlin	

Parliamentary group leader in the Riksdag
Year	Name
1991–2002	Göran Hägglund
2002–2010	Stefan Attefall
2010–2012	Mats Odell
2012–2015	Emma Henriksson
2015–2022	Andreas Carlson
2022–present	Camilla Brodin

=== Other notable members ===
- Peter Althin, MP and judicial spokesman
- Johan DeFarfalla, former Opeth bassist
- Jerzy Einhorn, cancer researcher and MP 1991–1994
- Gert Fylking
- Emma Henriksson
- Bert Karlsson
- Mikael Ljungman
- Bror Stefenson, Chairman of the Christian Democratic Senior League
- Anders Wijkman, MEP

=== International affiliation ===
The party is a member of the European People's Party (EPP), the Centrist Democrat International (CDI), and the International Democracy Union (IDU).

=== Associated organisations ===
- Christian Democratic Youth League
- Christian Democratic Student League
- Christian Democratic Senior League
- Christian Democratic Women's league
- Lutheran-wing – Kristdemokrater för en levande kyrka
- LGBT+ organisation – Open Christian Democrats (Öppna kristdemokrater)
- Think tank – Civitas
- Study organisation – Framtidsbildarna

== Literature ==
- Niels Arbøl, Kristdemokraterna en världsrörelse (Samhällsgemenskap, 1986) ISBN 91-85036-22-6
- Cecilia Hjort Attefall, Partiet som lyfte: 40 år med svensk kristdemokrati: 1964-2004 (Samhällsgemenskap, 2004) ISBN 91-85036-52-8
- Birger Ekstedt, KDS - en politisk nödvändighet (Samhällsgemenskap, 1970)
- Göran V. Johansson, Kristen Demokrati På Svenska (Liber, 1985) ISBN 91-40-05103-X
- Erik Lindfelt, Moralpartiet. En bok om KdS (Carlssons, 1991) ISBN 91-7798-433-1
- Bernt Olsson, Upprinnelsen - Om Kristdemokraternas första tid i Sverige (Samhällsgemenskap, 2004) ISBN 91-85036-56-0
- Allan Sandström, KDS - Partiet bakom fromhetsvallen (LT, 1979) ISBN 91-36-01329-3
- Alf Svensson, I Tiden, från motvind till uppvindar (Samhällsgemenskap, 1984) ISBN 91-85036-10-2
- Kristdemokratisk Debatt (paper published by the party between 1992 and 2003) ISSN 1103-1522

== See also ==
- Alliance for Sweden
- Government of Sweden
- Parliament of Sweden
- Elections in Sweden
- European People's Party
